= 2023 SEC men's basketball tournament =

American college basketball postseason tournament

- Classification: Division I
- Season: 2022–23
- Teams: 14
- Site: Bridgestone Arena; Nashville, Tennessee
- Champions: Alabama (8th title)
- Winning coach: Nate Oats (2nd title)
- MVP: Brandon Miller (Alabama)
- Attendance: 112,388
- Television: SEC Network, ESPN

The 2023 Southeastern Conference Men's Basketball Tournament was the postseason men's basketball tournament for the Southeastern Conference held at the Bridgestone Arena in Nashville, Tennessee, from March 8 to 12, 2023.

2022–23 Southeastern Conference men's basketball standings
	Conf.				Overall
Team	W		L	PCT	W		L	PCT
No. 1 Alabama†	16	–	2	.889	31	–	6	.838
No. 17 Texas A&M	15	–	3	.833	25	–	10	.714
Kentucky	12	–	6	.667	22	–	12	.647
No. 23 Missouri	11	–	7	.611	25	–	10	.714
No. 20 Tennessee	11	–	7	.611	25	–	11	.694
Vanderbilt	11	–	7	.611	22	–	15	.595
Auburn	10	–	8	.556	21	–	13	.618
Florida	9	–	9	.500	16	–	17	.485
Mississippi State	8	–	10	.444	21	–	13	.618
Arkansas	8	–	10	.444	22	–	14	.611
Georgia	6	–	12	.333	16	–	16	.500
South Carolina	4	–	14	.222	11	–	21	.344
Ole Miss	3	–	15	.167	12	–	21	.364
LSU	2	–	16	.111	14	–	19	.424
† 2023 SEC tournament winner Rankings from AP poll

== Seeds ==
All 14 SEC teams participated in the tournament. Teams were seeded by record within the conference, with a tiebreaker system to seed teams with identical conference records. The top 10 teams received a first round bye and the top four teams received a double bye, automatically advancing them into the quarterfinals.

Seed	School	Conference Record	Tiebreak 1	Tiebreak 2
1	Alabama	16–2		
2	Texas A&M	15–3		
3	Kentucky	12–6		
4	Missouri	11–7	2–0 vs. Tennessee/Vanderbilt	
5	Tennessee	11–7	1–2 vs. Missouri/Vanderbilt	1–0 vs. Alabama
6	Vanderbilt	11–7	1–2 vs. Missouri/Tennessee	0–2 vs. Alabama
7	Auburn	10–8		
8	Florida	9–9		
9	Mississippi State	8–10	1–0 vs. Arkansas	
10	Arkansas	8–10	0–1 vs. Mississippi State	
11	Georgia	6–12		
12	South Carolina	4–14		
13	Ole Miss	3–15		
14	LSU	2–16		

== Schedule ==
Game	Time*	Matchup^{#}	Score	Television	Attendance	U.S. Viewers (Millions)
First round – Wednesday, March 8						
1	6:00 pm	No. 12 South Carolina vs. No. 13 Ole Miss	61–67	SECN	14,326	TBA
2	8:20 pm	No. 11 Georgia vs. No. 14 LSU	67–72	SECN	14,326	TBA
Second round – Thursday, March 9						
3	12:00 pm	No. 8 Florida vs. No. 9 Mississippi State	68–69^{OT}	SECN	13,165	TBA
4	2:30 pm	No. 5 Tennessee vs. No. 13 Ole Miss	70–55	SECN	13,165	TBA
5	6:00 pm	No. 7 Auburn vs. No. 10 Arkansas	73–76	SECN	14,583	TBA
6	8:30 pm	No. 6 Vanderbilt vs. No. 14 LSU	77–68	SECN	14,583	TBA
Quarterfinals – Friday, March 10						
7	12:00 pm	No. 1 Alabama vs. No. 9 Mississippi State	72–49	ESPN	16,107	0.71
8	2:30 pm	No. 4 Missouri vs. No. 5 Tennessee	79–71	ESPN	16,107	1.44
9	6:00 pm	No. 2 Texas A&M vs. No. 10 Arkansas	67–61	SECN	17,989	TBA
10	8:30 pm	No. 3 Kentucky vs. No. 6 Vanderbilt	73–80	SECN	17,989	TBA
Semifinals – Saturday, March 11						
11	12:00 pm	No. 1 Alabama vs. No. 4 Missouri	72–61	ESPN	17,528	1.51
12	2:30 pm	No. 2 Texas A&M vs. No. 6 Vanderbilt	87–75	ESPN	17,528	1.15
Championship – Sunday, March 12						
13	12:00 pm	No. 1 Alabama vs. No. 2 Texas A&M	82–63	ESPN	18,690	1.95

*Game times in Central Time. #Rankings denote tournament seeding.

== Bracket ==
First round Wednesday, March 8 SEC Network
12	South Carolina	61
13	Ole Miss	67
11	Georgia	67
14	LSU	72

Second round Thursday, March 9 SEC Network
8	Florida	68
9	Mississippi State	69*
5	Tennessee	70
13	Ole Miss	55
7	Auburn	73
10	Arkansas	76
6	Vanderbilt	77
14	LSU	68

Quarterfinals; Friday, March 10; ESPN/SEC Network
1	Alabama	72
9	Mississippi State	49
4	Missouri	79
5	Tennessee	71
2	Texas A&M	67
10	Arkansas	61
3	Kentucky	73
6	Vanderbilt	80

Semifinals; Saturday, March 11; ESPN
1	Alabama	72
4	Missouri	61
2	Texas A&M	87
6	Vanderbilt	75

Championship; Sunday, March 12; ESPN
1	Alabama	82
2	Texas A&M	63

* denotes overtime period

== Game summaries ==
=== First round ===
SECN

March 8
6:00 pm

No. 12 South Carolina Gamecocks 61, No. 13 Ole Miss Rebels 67
Scoring by half: 29–30, 32–37
Pts: Gregory Jackson II, 24; Rebs: Josh Gray, 6 Asts: Meechie Johnson, 5	Pts: Amaree Abram, 20; Rebs: James White, 10; Asts: Myles Burns, 4

Bridgestone Arena
Nashville, TN
Attendance: 14,326
Referees: Steven Anderson, Tony Greene, Wil Howard

SECN

March 8
8:30 pm

No. 11 Georgia Bulldogs 67, No. 14 LSU Tigers 72
Scoring by half: 30–42, 37–30
Pts: Tied, 13; Rebs: Matthew-Alexander Moncrieffe, 8 Asts: Justin Hill, 4	Pts: KJ Williams, 18; Rebs: Trae Hannibal, 11; Asts: KJ Williams, 4

Bridgestone Arena
Nashville, TN
Attendance: 14,326
Referees: Pat Adams, Chuck Jones, Todd Austin

=== Second round ===
SECN

March 9
12:00 pm

No. 8 Florida Gators 68, No. 9 Mississippi State Bulldogs 69 (OT)
Scoring by half: 26–36, 31–21 Overtime: 11–12
Pts: Riley Kugel, 14; Rebs: Myreon Jones, 7 Asts: Kyle Lofton, 6	Pts: Tolu Smith, 28; Rebs: Tolu Smith, 12; Asts: Dashawn Davis, 8

Bridgestone Arena
Nashville, TN
Attendance: 13,165
Referees: Joe Lindsay, K.B. Burdett Jr., Byron Jarrett

SECN

March 9
2:30 pm

No. 5 Tennessee Volunteers 70, No. 13 Ole Miss Rebels 55
Scoring by half: 39–33, 31–22
Pts: Josiah Jordan-James, 20; Rebs: Josiah Jordan-James, 7 Asts: Oliver Nkamhoua, 4	Pts: Myles Burns, 14; Rebs: Tied, 5 Asts: Matthew Murrell, 4

Bridgestone Arena
Nashville, TN
Attendance: 13,165
Referees: Bart Lenox, Chuck Jones, Wil Howard

SECN

March 9
6:00 pm

No. 7 Auburn Tigers 73, No. 10 Arkansas Razorbacks 76
Scoring by half: 33–37, 40–39
Pts: K.D. Johnson, 20; Rebs: Johni Broome, 7 Asts: Wendell Green Jr., 4	Pts: Anthony Black, 19; Rebs: Davonte Davis, 10; Asts: Anthony Black, 6

Bridgestone Arena
Nashville, TN
Attendance: 14,583
Referees: Terry Oglesby, Don Daily, Vladimir Voyard-Tadal

SECN

March 9
8:30 pm

No. 6 Vanderbilt Commodores 77, No. 14 LSU Tigers 68
Scoring by half: 37–29, 40–39
Pts: Tyrin Lawrence, 22; Rebs: Jordan Wright, 15; Asts: Ezra Manjon, 3	Pts: KJ Williams, 26; Rebs: Trae Hanibal, 13; Asts: Trae Hanibal, 4

Bridgestone Arena
Nashville, TN
Attendance: 14,583
Referees: Doug Shows, Olandis Poole, Owen Shortt

=== Quarterfinals ===
ESPN

March 10
12:00 pm

No. 1 Alabama Crimson Tide 72, No. 9 Mississippi State Bulldogs 49
Scoring by half: 41–21, 31–28
Pts: Brandon Miller, 18; Rebs: Brandon Miller, 9 Asts: Brandon Miller, 5	Pts: Tolu Smith, 17; Rebs: Tolu Smith, 11; Asts: Tied, 1

Bridgestone Arena
Nashville, TN
Attendance: 16,107
Referees: Don Daily, Pat Adams, Todd Austin

ESPN

March 10
2:30 pm

No. 4 Missouri Tigers 79, No. 5 Tennessee Volunteers 71
Scoring by half: 30–33, 49–38
Pts: D'Moi Hodge, 26; Rebs: Kobe Brown, 9 Asts: Nick Honor, 4	Pts: Santiago Véscovi, 17; Rebs: Olivier Nkamhoua, 10; Asts: Jahmai Mashack, 4

Bridgestone Arena
Nashville, TN
Attendance: 16,107
Referees: Joe Lindsay, Steven Anderson, Vladimir Voyard-Tadal

SECN

March 10
6:00 pm

No. 2 Texas A&M Aggies 67, No. 10 Arkansas Razorbacks 61
Scoring by half: 25–38, 42–23
Pts: Wade Taylor IV, 18; Rebs: Henry Coleman III, 11; Asts: Wade Taylor IV, 3	Pts: Nick Smith Jr., 16; Rebs: Tied, 6 Asts: Nick Smith Jr., 4

Bridgestone Arena
Nashville, TN
Attendance: 17,989
Referees: Doug Shows, Bart Lenox, Owen Shortt

SECN

March 10
8:30 pm

No. 3 Kentucky Wildcats 73, No. 6 Vanderbilt Commodores 80
Scoring by half: 34–39, 39–41
Pts: Antonio Reeves, 22; Rebs: Oscar Tshiebwe, 15; Asts: Cason Wallace, 5	Pts: Ezra Manjon, 25; Rebs: Jordan Wright, 6 Asts: Tied, 3

Bridgestone Arena
Nashville, TN
Attendance: 17,989
Referees: Terry Oglesby, K.B. Burdett Jr., Olandis Poole

=== Semifinals ===
ESPN

March 11
12:00 pm

No. 1 Alabama Crimson Tide 72, No. 4 Missouri Tigers 61
Scoring by half: 31–29, 41–32
Pts: Brandon Miller, 20; Rebs: Brandon Miller, 12; Asts: Jahvon Quinerly, 7	Pts: D'Moi Hodge, 21; Rebs: D'Moi Hodge, 9 Asts: Tied, 2

Bridgestone Arena
Nashville, TN
Attendance: 17,528
Referees: Joe Lindsay, Pat Adams, Bart Lenox

ESPN

March 11
2:30 pm

No. 2 Texas A&M Aggies 87, No. 6 Vanderbilt Commodores 75
Scoring by half: 49–25, 38–50
Pts: Wade Taylor IV, 25; Rebs: Dexter Dennis, 7 Asts: Tyrece Radford, 5	Pts: Tyrin Lawrence, 18; Rebs: Jordan Wright, 7 Asts: Ezra Manjon, 7

Bridgestone Arena
Nashville, TN
Attendance: 17,528
Referees: Doug Shows, K.B. Burdett Jr., Byron Jarrett

=== Final ===
ESPN

March 12
12:00 pm

No. 1 Alabama Crimson Tide 82, No. 2 Texas A&M Aggies 63
Scoring by half: 34–23, 48–40
Pts: Brandon Miller, 23; Rebs: Charles Bediako, 13; Asts: Brandon Miller, 4	Pts: Dexter Dennis, 14; Rebs: Henry Coleman III, 9 Asts: Wade Taylor IV, 3

Bridgestone Arena
Nashville, TN
Attendance: 18,690
Referees: Terry Oglesby, Don Daily, Steven Anderson

== See also ==
- 2023 SEC Women's Basketball Tournament
