= 2022–23 Florida Gators men's basketball team =

American college basketball season

2022–23 Florida Gators men's basketball

NIT, First round
- Conference: Southeastern Conference
- Record: 16–17 (9–9 SEC)
- Head coach: Todd Golden (1st season)
- Associate head coach: Carlin Hartman
- Assistant coaches: Korey McCray; Kevin Hovde
- Home arena: O'Connell Center

2022–23 Southeastern Conference men's basketball standings
	Conf.				Overall
Team	W		L	PCT	W		L	PCT
No. 1 Alabama†	16	–	2	.889	31	–	6	.838
No. 17 Texas A&M	15	–	3	.833	25	–	10	.714
Kentucky	12	–	6	.667	22	–	12	.647
No. 23 Missouri	11	–	7	.611	25	–	10	.714
No. 20 Tennessee	11	–	7	.611	25	–	11	.694
Vanderbilt	11	–	7	.611	22	–	15	.595
Auburn	10	–	8	.556	21	–	13	.618
Florida	9	–	9	.500	16	–	17	.485
Mississippi State	8	–	10	.444	21	–	13	.618
Arkansas	8	–	10	.444	22	–	14	.611
Georgia	6	–	12	.333	16	–	16	.500
South Carolina	4	–	14	.222	11	–	21	.344
Ole Miss	3	–	15	.167	12	–	21	.364
LSU	2	–	16	.111	14	–	19	.424
† 2023 SEC tournament winner Rankings from AP poll

The 2022–23 Florida Gators men's basketball team represented the University of Florida during the 2022–23 NCAA Division I men's basketball season. The team was led by first-year head coach Todd Golden, and played their home games at the O'Connell Center in Gainesville, Florida as a member of the Southeastern Conference. They finished the season 16–15, 9–9 in SEC Play to finish in eighth place. As the No. 8 seed in the SEC tournament, they lost in the second round to Mississippi State. They received an at-large bid to the National Invitation Tournament where they lost to UCF 67–49 in the first round.

== Previous season ==
The Gators finished the 2021–22 season 20–14, 9–9 in SEC Play to finish a five-way tie for fifth place. As the No. 9 seed in the SEC tournament, they lost in the second round to Texas A&M. They received an at-large bid to the National Invitation Tournament where they defeated Iona in the first round before losing to Xavier.

On March 13, 2022, head coach Mike White left the school to take the head coaching position at Georgia. On March 18, the school named San Francisco head coach Todd Golden the team's new head coach.

== Offseason ==
=== Departures ===
Name	Number	Pos.	Height	Weight	Year	Hometown	Reason for departure
Anthony Duruji	4	F	6'7"	209	RS Senior	Germantown, MD	Graduated/went undrafted in 2022 NBA draft
Elijah Kennedy	10	G	6'3"	185	Freshman	Virginia Beach, VA	Transferred to Texas State
Keyontae Johnson	11	F	6'5"	229	Senior	Norfolk, VA	Graduate transferred to Kansas State
Tyree Appleby	22	G	6'1"	163	RS Senior	Jacksonville, AR	Graduate transferred to Wake Forest
Brandon McKissic	23	G	6'3"	185	GS Senior	Ferguson, MO	Graduated
Phlandrous Fleming Jr.	24	G	6'5"	205	GS Senior	Athens, GA	Graduated
Tuongthach Gatkek	32	F	6'9"	172	Sophomore	Portland, ME	Transferred to Texas State

=== Incoming transfers ===
Name	Number	Pos.	Height	Weight	Year	Hometown	Previous School
Trey Bonham	2	G	6'0"	170	Junior	Mobile, AL	VMI
Alex Fudge	3	F	6'8"	185	Sophomore	Jacksonville, FL	LSU
Will Richard	5	G	6'5"	195	Sophomore	Fairburn, GA	Belmont
Kyle Lofton	11	G	6'3"	185	GS Senior	Hillside, NJ	St. Bonaventure

=== 2022 recruiting class ===
College recruiting information
Name	Hometown	School	Height	Weight	Commit date
Riley Kugel #19 SF	Orlando, FL	Dr. Phillips High School	6 ft 5 in (1.96 m)	175 lb (79 kg)	May 23, 2022
Riley Kugel #19 SF	Recruit ratings: Scout: Rivals: 247Sports: ESPN: (84)				
Denzel Aberdeen #53 SG	Orlando, FL	Dr. Phillips High School	6 ft 4 in (1.93 m)	175 lb (79 kg)	Sep 19, 2021
Denzel Aberdeen #53 SG	Recruit ratings: Scout: Rivals: 247Sports: ESPN: (80)				
Aleks Szymczyk; PF	Germany	N/A	6 ft 10 in (2.08 m)	233 lb (106 kg)	Sep 1, 2022
Aleks Szymczyk; PF	Recruit ratings: Scout: Rivals: 247Sports: ESPN: (NR)				
Overall recruit ranking:
Note: In many cases, Scout, Rivals, 247Sports, On3, and ESPN may conflict in their listings of height and weight.; In these cases, the average was taken. ESPN grades are on a 100-point scale.; Sources: "2022 Florida Basketball Commits". Scout.; "Scout.com Team Recruiting Rankings". Scout.; "2022 Team Ranking". Rivals.

=== 2023 recruiting class ===
College recruiting information (2023)
Name	Hometown	School	Height	Weight	Commit date
Thomas Haugh #39 SF	Pennsburg, PA	Perkiomen School	6 ft 9 in (2.06 m)	200 lb (91 kg)	Jun 29, 2022
Thomas Haugh #39 SF	Recruit ratings: Scout: Rivals: 247Sports: ESPN: (80)				
Overall recruit ranking:
Note: In many cases, Scout, Rivals, 247Sports, On3, and ESPN may conflict in their listings of height and weight.; In these cases, the average was taken. ESPN grades are on a 100-point scale.; Sources: "2023 Florida Basketball Commits". Scout.; "Scout.com Team Recruiting Rankings". Scout.; "2023 Team Ranking". Rivals.

== Roster ==
2022–23 Florida Gators men's basketball team
Players
Coaches

Pos.	#	Name	Height	Weight	Year	Previous school	Hometown
G	0	Myreon Jones	6 ft 3 in (1.91 m)	177 lb (80 kg)	GS	Penn State	Birmingham, Alabama
F	1	C. J. Felder	6 ft 7 in (2.01 m)	240 lb (109 kg)	Sr	Boston College	Sumter, South Carolina
G	2	Trey Bonham	6 ft 0 in (1.83 m)	170 lb (77 kg)	Jr	VMI	Mobile, Alabama
F	3	Alex Fudge	6 ft 9 in (2.06 m)	200 lb (91 kg)	So	LSU	Jacksonville, Florida
G	4	Niels Lane	6 ft 5 in (1.96 m)	215 lb (98 kg)	Jr	Rosselle Catholic	Freehold, New Jersey
G	5	Will Richard	6 ft 4 in (1.93 m)	206 lb (93 kg)	So	Belmont	Fairburn, Georgia
G	10	Denzel Aberdeen	6 ft 5 in (1.96 m)	189 lb (86 kg)	Fr	Dr. Phillips	Orlando, Florida
G	11	Kyle Lofton	6 ft 3 in (1.91 m)	188 lb (85 kg)	GS	St. Bonaventure	Hillside, New Jersey
F	12	Colin Castleton	6 ft 11 in (2.11 m)	250 lb (113 kg)	GS	Michigan	DeLand, Florida
F	13	Aleks Szymczyk	6 ft 10 in (2.08 m)	240 lb (109 kg)	Fr	Gymnasium München-Nord/IBAM	Frankfurt, Germany
G	14	Kowacie Reeves	6 ft 6 in (1.98 m)	192 lb (87 kg)	So	Westside	Macon, Georgia
G	20	Jack May (W)	6 ft 4 in (1.93 m)	195 lb (88 kg)	RS So	Saint Andrew's School	Boca Raton, Florida
G	21	Alex Klatsky (W)	6 ft 4 in (1.93 m)	206 lb (93 kg)	RS Jr	Ranney School	Colts Neck, New Jersey
G	24	Riley Kugel	6 ft 5 in (1.96 m)	207 lb (94 kg)	Fr	Dr. Phillips	Orlando, Florida
C	33	Jason Jitoboh	6 ft 11 in (2.11 m)	300 lb (136 kg)	Sr	Hamilton Heights (TN)	Abuja, Nigeria

Head coach

- Todd Golden (Saint Mary's)

Assistant coach(es)

- Carlin Hartman (Tulane)
- Korey McCray (Mercer)
- Kevin Hovde (Richmond)

Legend

- (C) Team captain
- (S) Suspended
- (I) Ineligible
- (W) Walk-on
- Injured
- Current redshirt

Roster

== Schedule and results ==
Date time, TV	Rank^{#}	Opponent^{#}	Result	Record	High points	High rebounds	High assists	Site (attendance) city, state
Regular season
November 7, 2022*; 8:00 p.m., SECN+/ESPN+		Stony Brook	W 81–45	1–0	16 – Fudge	5 – 4 tied	4 – Bonham	O'Connell Center (7,377); Gainesville, FL
November 11, 2022*; 7:00 p.m., SECN+/ESPN+		Kennesaw State	W 88–78	2–0	33 – Castleton	9 – Castleton	3 – Castleton	O'Connell Center (9,072); Gainesville, FL
November 14, 2022*; 7:00 p.m., SECN		Florida Atlantic	L 74–76	2–1	30 – Castleton	12 – Castleton	6 – Lofton	O'Connell Center (7,180); Gainesville, FL
November 18, 2022*; 8:00 p.m., ACCN		at Florida State; Rivalry	W 76–67	3–1	25 – Castleton	9 – Castleton	3 – 2 tied	Donald L. Tucker Civic Center (9,182); Tallahassee, FL
November 24, 2022*; 5:30 p.m., ESPN2		vs. Xavier; Phil Knight Legacy quarterfinals	L 83–90	3–2	23 – Bonham	10 – Castleton	6 – Lofton	Veterans Memorial Coliseum (4,465); Portland, OR
November 25, 2022*; 6:00 p.m., ESPNU		vs. Oregon State; Phil Knight Legacy consolation second round	W 81–68	4–2	19 – Bonham	7 – Lofton	4 – 2 tied	Moda Center (6,526); Portland, OR
November 27, 2022*; 8:30 p.m., ESPNU		vs. West Virginia; Phil Knight Legacy fifth place game	L 55–84	4–3	17 – Lofton	7 – Fudge	4 – Lofton	Chiles Center (1,016); Portland, OR
November 30, 2022*; 8:00 p.m., SECN+/ESPN+		Florida A&M	W 102–62	5–3	16 – Bonham	10 – Fudge	5 – Castleton	O'Connell Center (6,515); Gainesville, FL
December 4, 2022*; 2:00 p.m., SECN		Stetson	W 89–51	6–3	14 – Richard	8 – Fudge	4 – Jones	O'Connell Center (7,087); Gainesville, FL
December 7, 2022*; 9:00 p.m., ESPN2		No. 5 UConn	L 54–75	6–4	13 – 2 tied	8 – Castleton	2 – Castleton	O'Connell Center (9,046); Gainesville, FL
December 14, 2022*; 7:00 p.m., ESPN2		vs. Ohio	W 82–48	7–4	20 – Reeves	10 – Fudge	7 – Lofton	Amalie Arena (5,023); Tampa, FL
December 20, 2022*; 9:30 p.m., ESPN2		vs. Oklahoma; Jumpman Invitational	L 53–62	7–5	22 – Castleton	8 – Castleton	2 – Lofton	Spectrum Center (8,745); Charlotte, NC
December 28, 2022; 7:00 p.m., ESPN2		at No. 20 Auburn	L 58–61	7–6 (0–1)	15 – Reeves	8 – Castleton	4 – Castleton	Neville Arena (9,121); Auburn, AL
January 4, 2023; 7:00 p.m., ESPNU		Texas A&M	L 63–66	7–7 (0–2)	21 – Bonham	5 – 4 tied	4 – Bonham	O'Connell Center (7,023); Gainesville, FL
January 7, 2023; 1:00 p.m., SECN		Georgia	W 82–75	8–7 (1–2)	18 – Lofton	9 – Richard	5 – Castleton	O'Connell Center (9,077); Gainesville, FL
January 10, 2023; 7:00 p.m., SECN		at LSU	W 67–56	9–7 (2–2)	18 – Castleton	7 – Castleton	3 – Jones	Pete Maravich Assembly Center (9,159); Baton Rouge, LA
January 14, 2023; 3:30 p.m., SECN		No. 20 Missouri	W 73–64	10–7 (3–2)	18 – Richard	13 – Castleton	6 – Castleton	O'Connell Center (9,301); Gainesville, FL
January 18, 2023; 7:00 p.m., SECN		at Texas A&M	L 52–54	10–8 (3–3)	14 – Castleton	13 – Castleton	3 – Fudge	Reed Arena (12,126); College Station, TX
January 21, 2023; 8:30 p.m., SECN		at Mississippi State	W 61–59	11–8 (4–3)	13 – Castleton	8 – Lofton	6 – Lofton	Humphrey Coliseum (8,660); Starkville, MS
January 25, 2023; 7:00 p.m., ESPN2		South Carolina	W 81–60	12–8 (5–3)	18 – Castleton	10 – Jones	8 – Jones	O'Connell Center (7,831); Gainesville, FL
January 28, 2023*; 6:00 p.m., ESPN2		at No. 5 Kansas State; Big 12/SEC Challenge	L 50–64	12–9	13 – Castleton	8 – Castleton	6 – Kugel	Bramlage Coliseum (11,000); Manhattan, KS
February 1, 2023; 7:00 p.m., ESPN2		No. 2 Tennessee	W 67–54	13–9 (6–3)	20 – Castleton	9 – Castleton	4 – 2 tied	O'Connell Center (10,160); Gainesville, FL
February 4, 2023; 8:30 p.m., ESPN		at Kentucky; Rivalry	L 67–72	13–10 (6–4)	25 – Castleton	8 – Castleton	5 – Castleton	Rupp Arena (20,315); Lexington, KY
February 8, 2023; 9:00 p.m., ESPN2		at No. 3 Alabama	L 69–97	13–11 (6–5)	29 – Castleton	10 – Castleton	6 – Lofton	Coleman Coliseum (10,599); Tuscaloosa, AL
February 11, 2023; 3:30 p.m., SECN		Vanderbilt	L 80–88	13–12 (6–6)	25 – Castleton	11 – Castleton	6 – Lofton	O'Connell Center (10,024); Gainesville, FL
February 15, 2023; 6:30 p.m., SECN		Ole Miss	W 79–64	14–12 (7–6)	15 – Jones	8 – Jones	7 – Lofton	O'Connell Center (7,464); Gainesville, FL
February 18, 2023; 2:00 p.m., ESPN2		at Arkansas	L 65–84	14–13 (7–7)	24 – Kugel	6 – Szymczyk	4 – Lofton	Bud Walton Arena (19,200); Fayetteville, AR
February 22, 2023; 7:00 p.m., ESPN		Kentucky; Rivalry	L 74–82	14–14 (7–8)	24 – Kugel	3 – 3 tied	11 – Lofton	O'Connell Center (9,540); Gainesville, FL
February 25, 2023; 6:00 p.m., ESPN2		at Vanderbilt	L 72–88	14–15 (7–9)	20 – Kugel	7 – Richard	3 – Fudge	Memorial Gymnasium (10,133); Nashville, TN
February 28, 2023; 7:00 p.m., SECN		at Georgia	W 77–67	15–15 (8–9)	24 – Richard	12 – Jones	4 – 2 tied	Stegeman Coliseum (7,879); Athens, GA
March 4, 2023; 6:00 p.m., SECN		LSU	W 79–67	16–15 (9–9)	21 – Kugel	6 – 2 tied	5 – Lofton	O'Connell Center (10,280); Gainesville, FL
SEC tournament
March 9, 2023; 1:00 p.m., SECN	(8)	vs. (9) Mississippi State; Second round	L 68–69 ^{OT}	16–16	14 – Kugel	7 – Jones	6 – Lofton	Bridgestone Arena (13,165); Nashville, TN
NIT tournament
March 15, 2023*; 7:00 p.m., ESPN2	(4)	UCF; First round – Oregon bracket	L 49–67	16–17	13 – Kugel	7 – Richard	2 – 2 tied	O'Connell Center (3,023); Gainesville, FL
*Non-conference game. ^{#}Rankings from AP Poll. (#) Tournament seedings in parentheses. All times are in Eastern Time.

== Rankings ==
Ranking movements Legend: ██ Increase in ranking ██ Decrease in ranking — = Not ranked RV = Received votes
	Week																			
Poll	Pre	1	2	3	4	5	6	7	8	9	10	11	12	13	14	15	16	17	18	Final
AP	RV	RV	—	—	—	—	—	—	—	—	—	—	—	—	—	—	—	—	—	Not released
Coaches	RV	RV	—	—	—	—	—	—	—	—	—	—	—	—	—	—	—	—	—	—

*AP does not release post-NCAA tournament rankings.

== See also ==
- 2022–23 Florida Gators women's basketball team
