= Stephen Dix Jr. =

American football player (born 2002)

Profile
- Position: Linebacker

Personal information
- Born: January 13, 2002 (age 24)
- Listed height: 6 ft 1 in (1.85 m)
- Listed weight: 245 lb (111 kg)

Career information
- High school: Dr. Phillips (Dr. Phillips, Florida)
- College: Florida State (2020–2022); Marshall (2023); Arkansas (2024–2025)
- NFL draft: 2026: undrafted

Career history
- Arizona Cardinals (2026)*; Miami Dolphins (2026)*
- * Offseason or practice squad member only
- Stats at Pro Football Reference

Stephen Dix Jr. (born January 13, 2002) is an American football linebacker. He played college football for the Florida State Seminoles, the Marshall Thundering Herd and for the Arkansas Razorbacks.

== Early life ==
Dix Jr. attended Dr. Phillips High School in Dr. Phillips, Florida, and committed to play college football for the Florida State Seminoles.

== College career ==
=== Florida State ===
As a freshman in 2020, Dix Jr. played in nine games, making five starts, recording 45 tackles with three and a half being for a loss. In 2021, he totaled 14 tackles and a pass deflection. Dix Jr. missed the 2022 season due to injury. After the season, he entered his name into the NCAA transfer portal.

=== Marshall ===
Dix Jr. transferred to play for the Marshall Thundering Herd. In week 7 of the 2023 season, he made his first start for the Thundering Herd against James Madison Dukes. Dix Jr. finished the 2023 season with 67 tackles with six and a half going for a loss, and two sacks. After the season, he once again entered the NCAA transfer portal.

=== Arkansas ===
Dix Jr. transferred to play for the Arkansas Razorbacks. In his first season with the Razorbacks in 2024, he notched 72 tackles with two and a half being for a loss, two sacks, and a fumble recovery. In the 2025 season, Dix Jr. racked up 79 tackles with four going for a loss, and a sack.

== Professional career ==
Pre-draft measurables
Height	Weight	Arm length	Hand span	Wingspan	40-yard dash	10-yard split	20-yard split	20-yard shuttle	Three-cone drill	Vertical jump	Broad jump	Bench press
6 ft 0 7/8 in (1.85 m)	245 lb (111 kg)	32 1/2 in (0.83 m)	9 1/2 in (0.24 m)	6 ft 6 1/2 in (1.99 m)	4.73 s	1.72 s	2.70 s	4.36 s	7.22 s	32.5 in (0.83 m)	9 ft 11 in (3.02 m)	25 reps
All values from Pro Day

=== Arizona Cardinals ===
After not being selected in the 2026 NFL draft, Dix Jr. signed with the Arizona Cardinals as an undrafted free agent. He was waived by the Cardinals on June 11, 2026.

=== Miami Dolphins ===
On August 21, 2026, the Miami Dolphins signed Dix. He was waived by the Dolphins on August 29.
