= 2022–23 Mississippi State Bulldogs men's basketball team =

American college basketball season

2022–23 Mississippi State Bulldogs men's basketball

Fort Myers Tip-Off champions

NCAA tournament, First Four
- Conference: Southeastern Conference
- Record: 21–13 (8–10 SEC)
- Head coach: Chris Jans (1st season)
- Assistant coaches: James Miller; David Anwar; George Brooks
- Home arena: Humphrey Coliseum

2022–23 Southeastern Conference men's basketball standings
	Conf.				Overall
Team	W		L	PCT	W		L	PCT
No. 1 Alabama†	16	–	2	.889	31	–	6	.838
No. 17 Texas A&M	15	–	3	.833	25	–	10	.714
Kentucky	12	–	6	.667	22	–	12	.647
No. 23 Missouri	11	–	7	.611	25	–	10	.714
No. 20 Tennessee	11	–	7	.611	25	–	11	.694
Vanderbilt	11	–	7	.611	22	–	15	.595
Auburn	10	–	8	.556	21	–	13	.618
Florida	9	–	9	.500	16	–	17	.485
Mississippi State	8	–	10	.444	21	–	13	.618
Arkansas	8	–	10	.444	22	–	14	.611
Georgia	6	–	12	.333	16	–	16	.500
South Carolina	4	–	14	.222	11	–	21	.344
Ole Miss	3	–	15	.167	12	–	21	.364
LSU	2	–	16	.111	14	–	19	.424
† 2023 SEC tournament winner Rankings from AP poll

The 2022–23 Mississippi State Bulldogs men's basketball team represented Mississippi State University during the 2022–23 NCAA Division I men's basketball season. The team was led by first-year head coach Chris Jans, and played their home games at Humphrey Coliseum in Starkville, Mississippi as a member of the Southeastern Conference. They finished the season 20–11, 8–10 in SEC play to tie for 9th place. They defeated Florida in the second round of the SEC tournament before losing to Alabama in the quarterfinals. They received an at-large bid to the NCAA Tournament as an 11th seed, where they lost in the First Four play-in round to Pittsburgh.

== Previous season ==
The Bulldogs finished the 2021–22 season 18–16, 8–10 in SEC play to finish 10th place. They defeated South Carolina in the second round of the SEC tournament before losing to Tennessee in the quarterfinals. They received an at-large bid to the National Invitation Tournament where they lost in the first round to Virginia.

Following the season, the school fired head coach Howland. On March 20, 2022, the school named New Mexico State head coach Chris Jans the team's new head coach.

== Offseason ==
=== Departures ===
Name	Number	Pos.	Height	Weight	Year	Hometown	Reason for departure
Rocket Watts	0	G	6'2"	185	Junior	Detroit, MI	Transferred to Oakland
Iverson Molinar	1	G	6'3"	190	Junior	Panama City, Panama	Declare for 2022 NBA draft
Javian Davis	2	F	6'9"	240	RS Junior	Canton, MS	Graduate transferred to UAB
Cam Carter	5	G	6'3"	185	Freshman	Donaldsonville, LA	Transferred to Kansas State
Garrison Brooks	10	F	6'9"	230	GS Senior	Lafayette, AL	Graduated
Andersson Garcia	11	G/F	6'7"	210	Sophomore	Moca, DR	Transferred to Texas A&M
Derek Fountain	20	F	6'9"	220	Sophomore	Holly Springs, MS	Transferred to LSU
Alden Applewhite	44	F	6'7"	205	Freshman	Memphis, TN	Transferred to Portland

=== Incoming transfers ===
Name	Number	Pos.	Height	Weight	Year	Hometown	Previous School
Jamel Horton	2	G	6'4"	190	GS Senior	Queens, NY	Albany
Dashawn Davis	10	G	6'2"	185	Senior	Bronx, NY	Oregon State
Eric Reed, Jr.	11	G	6'2"	190	Senior	Baton Rouge, LA	Southeast Missouri State
Will McNair Jr.	13	F	6'10"	277	Junior	Philadelphia, PA	New Mexico State
Tyler Stevenson	14	F	6'8"	215	Senior	Columbus, MS	Southern Miss

=== 2022 recruiting class ===
College recruiting information
Name	Hometown	School	Height	Weight	Commit date
Kimani Hamilton #27 SF	Clinton, MS	Clinton High School	6 ft 7 in (2.01 m)	210 lb (95 kg)	Aug 28, 2020
Kimani Hamilton #27 SF	Recruit ratings: Scout: Rivals: 247Sports: ESPN: (NR)				
Martavious Russell; SG	Buhl, AL	Sipsey Valley High School	6 ft 4 in (1.93 m)	190 lb (86 kg)	Dec 10, 2022
Martavious Russell; SG	Recruit ratings: Scout: Rivals: 247Sports: ESPN: (NR)				
Overall recruit ranking:
Note: In many cases, Scout, Rivals, 247Sports, On3, and ESPN may conflict in their listings of height and weight.; In these cases, the average was taken. ESPN grades are on a 100-point scale.; Sources: "Mississippi State 2022 Basketball Commitments". Rivals.; "2022 Mississippi State Basketball Commits". Scout.; "ESPN". ESPN.; "Scout.com Team Recruiting Rankings". Scout.; "2022 Team Ranking". Rivals.

=== 2023 recruiting class ===
College recruiting information (2023)
Name	Hometown	School	Height	Weight	Commit date
Gai Chol #46 C	Decatur, GA	Greenforest Christian Academy	6 ft 10 in (2.08 m)	175 lb (79 kg)	Jul 9, 2022
Gai Chol #46 C	Recruit ratings: Scout: Rivals: 247Sports: ESPN: (81)				
Overall recruit ranking:
Note: In many cases, Scout, Rivals, 247Sports, On3, and ESPN may conflict in their listings of height and weight.; In these cases, the average was taken. ESPN grades are on a 100-point scale.; Sources: "Mississippi State 2023 Basketball Commitments". Rivals.; "2023 Mississippi State Basketball Commits". Scout.; "ESPN". ESPN.; "Scout.com Team Recruiting Rankings". Scout.; "2023 Team Ranking". Rivals.

== Roster ==
2022–23 Mississippi State Bulldogs men's basketball team
Players
Coaches

Pos.	#	Name	Height	Weight	Year	Previous school	Hometown
F	0	D. J. Jeffries	6 ft 7 in (2.01 m)	220 lb (100 kg)	Sr	Memphis	Olive Branch, MS
F	1	Tolu Smith	6 ft 11 in (2.11 m)	245 lb (111 kg)	RS Sr	Western Kentucky	Bay St. Louis, MS
G	2	Jamel Horton	6 ft 3 in (1.91 m)	190 lb (86 kg)	GS	Albany	Queens, NY
G	3	Shakeel Moore	6 ft 1 in (1.85 m)	185 lb (84 kg)	Jr	NC State	Greensboro, NC
G/F	4	Cameron Matthews	6 ft 7 in (2.01 m)	225 lb (102 kg)	Jr	Olive Branch HS	Olive Branch, MS
F	5	Kimani Hamilton	6 ft 7 in (2.01 m)	210 lb (95 kg)	Fr	Clinton HS	Clinton, MS
G	10	Dashawn Davis	6 ft 2 in (1.88 m)	190 lb (86 kg)	Sr	Oregon State	Bronx, NY
G	11	Eric Reed, Jr.	6 ft 2 in (1.88 m)	195 lb (88 kg)	Sr	Southeast Missouri State	Baton Rouge, LA
F	12	KeShawn Murphy	6 ft 10 in (2.08 m)	235 lb (107 kg)	RS Fr	Ramsey	Birmingham, AL
F	13	Will McNair Jr.	6 ft 11 in (2.11 m)	265 lb (120 kg)	Jr	New Mexico State	Philadelphia, PA
F	14	Tyler Stevenson	6 ft 8 in (2.03 m)	215 lb (98 kg)	Sr	Southern Miss	Columbus, MS
G	15	Justin Rumph (W)	6 ft 5 in (1.96 m)	225 lb (102 kg)	GS	Southern Union State CC	Birmingham, AL
G	21	Martavious Russell	6 ft 2 in (1.88 m)	185 lb (84 kg)	Fr	Sipsey Valley HS	Coker, AL
G	24	Tyler Brumfield (W)	6 ft 2 in (1.88 m)	180 lb (82 kg)	So	Montverde Academy	Los Angeles, CA
G	25	Isaac Stansbury (W)	6 ft 1 in (1.85 m)	170 lb (77 kg)	Sr	Greenwood HS	Bowling Green, KY
G	30	Shawn Jones Jr. (W)	6 ft 5 in (1.96 m)	190 lb (86 kg)	Fr	Shadow Creek HS	Houston, TX

Head coach

- Chris Jans (Loras)

Assistant coach(es)

- James Miller (CSU Pueblo)
- David Anwar (Fitchburg State)
- George Brooks (Mississippi State)

Legend

- (C) Team captain
- (S) Suspended
- (I) Ineligible
- (W) Walk-on
- Injured
- Current redshirt

Roster

== Schedule and results ==
Date time, TV	Rank^{#}	Opponent^{#}	Result	Record	High points	High rebounds	High assists	Site (attendance) city, state
Non-conference regular season
November 7, 2022*; 6:30 p.m., SECN+		Texas A&M–Corpus Christi	W 63–44	1–0	19 – Smith	11 – Smith	4 – Reed Jr.	Humphrey Coliseum (6,254); Starkville, MS
November 11, 2022*; 6:30 p.m., Barstool Sports		vs. Akron; Barstool Showcase	W 73–54	2–0	26 – Smith	8 – Smith	4 – Tied	Wells Fargo Center (5,213); Philadelphia, PA
November 13, 2022*; 2:00 p.m., SECN+		Arkansas–Pine Bluff	W 80–47	3–0	10 – Tied	9 – Smith	4 – Horton	Humphrey Coliseum (5,664); Starkville, MS
November 17, 2022*; 8:00 p.m., SECN		South Dakota; Fort Myers Tip-Off campus site game	W 79–42	4–0	16 – Smith	9 – Jeffries	4 – Hamilton	Humphrey Coliseum (6,047); Starkville, MS
November 21, 2022*; 5:00 p.m., FS1		vs. Marquette; Fort Myers Tip-Off semifinals	W 58–55	5–0	15 – Reed Jr.	16 – Smith	6 – Smith	Suncoast Credit Union Arena (1,894); Fort Myers, FL
November 23, 2022*; 7:30 p.m., FS1		vs. Utah; Fort Myers Tip-Off championship	W 52–49	6–0	18 – Davis	16 – Smith	3 – Tied	Suncoast Credit Union Arena (1,144); Fort Myers, FL
November 28, 2022*; 6:30 p.m., SECN+		Omaha	W 74–54	7–0	12 – Smith	8 – Smith	4 – Moore	Humphrey Coliseum (6,090); Starkville, MS
December 3, 2022*; 1:00 p.m., SECN+		Mississippi Valley State	W 82–52	8–0	24 – Smith	6 – Tied	6 – Moore	Humphrey Coliseum (6,343); Starkville, MS
December 11, 2022*; 7:30 p.m., BTN	No. 23	at Minnesota	W 69–51	9–0	20 – Smith	8 – Jeffries	7 – Jeffries	Williams Arena (8,664); Minneapolis, MN
December 14, 2022*; 6:30 p.m., SECN+	No. 17	vs. Jackson State; Magnolia Madness	W 69–59	10–0	15 – Jeffries	5 – Tied	5 – Matthews	Mississippi Coliseum (3,206); Jackson, MS
December 17, 2022*; 2:00 p.m., SECN	No. 17	Nicholls	W 68–66	11–0	15 – Smith	8 – Smith	6 – Davis	Humphrey Coliseum (6,023); Starkville, MS
December 20, 2022*; 4:00 p.m., BallerTV	No. 15	vs. Drake; Battle in the Vault	L 52–58	11–1	11 – Reed Jr.	8 – Jeffries	3 – Tied	Pinnacle Bank Arena; Lincoln, NE
SEC regular season
December 28, 2022; 8:00 p.m., SECN	No. 21	No. 8 Alabama	L 67–78	11–2 (0–1)	11 – Tied	15 – Jeffries	4 – Tied	Humphrey Coliseum (9,803); Starkville, MS
January 3, 2023; 6:00 p.m., ESPNU		at No. 8 Tennessee	L 53–87	11–3 (0–2)	15 – Stevenson	2 – Tied	6 – Davis	Thompson–Boling Arena (16,697); Knoxville, TN
January 7, 2023; 1:00 p.m., CBS		Ole Miss	W 64–54	12–3 (1–2)	13 – McNair Jr.	8 – Tied	5 – Matthews	Humphrey Coliseum (9,295); Starkville, MS
January 11, 2023; 5:30 p.m., SECN		at Georgia	L 50–58	12–4 (1–3)	15 – Moore	10 – Matthews	3 – Davis	Stegeman Coliseum (7,741); Athens, GA
January 14, 2023; 7:30 p.m., SECN		at No. 21 Auburn	L 63–69	12–5 (1–4)	20 – Smith	10 – Smith	4 – Davis	Neville Arena (9,121); Auburn, AL
January 17, 2023; 6:00 p.m., ESPN2		No. 9 Tennessee	L 59–70	12–6 (1–5)	20 – Moore	10 – Smith	5 – Davis	Humphrey Coliseum (8,797); Starkville, MS
January 21, 2023; 7:30 p.m., SECN		Florida	L 59–61	12–7 (1–6)	12 – Tied	11 – Tied	2 – Tied	Humphrey Coliseum (8,660); Starkville, MS
January 25, 2023; 8:00 p.m., SECN		at No. 2 Alabama	L 63–66	12–8 (1–7)	15 – Smith	7 – Tied	4 – Moore	Coleman Coliseum (11,681); Tuscaloosa, AL
January 28, 2023*; 3:00 p.m., ESPN2		No. 11 TCU; Big 12/SEC Challenge	W 81–74 ^{OT}	13–8	27 – Smith	13 – Smith	5 – Tied	Humphrey Coliseum (8,643); Starkville, MS
January 31, 2023; 5:30 p.m., SECN		at South Carolina	W 66–51	14–8 (2–7)	22 – Moore	8 – Smith	5 – Davis	Colonial Life Arena (9,129); Columbia, MO
February 4, 2023; 5:00 p.m., SECN		Missouri	W 63–52	15–8 (3–7)	25 – Smith	12 – Smith	6 – Davis	Humphrey Coliseum (8,494); Starkville, MS
February 8, 2023; 8:00 p.m., SECN		LSU	W 64–53	16–8 (4–7)	18 – Jeffries	7 – Jeffries	6 – Davis	Humphrey Coliseum (7,070); Starkville, MS
February 11, 2023; 5:00 p.m., ESPNU		at Arkansas	W 70–64	17–8 (5–7)	17 – Davis	8 – Smith	5 – Moore	Bud Walton Arena (19,200); Fayetteville, AR
February 15, 2023; 7:30 p.m., SECN		Kentucky	L 68–71	17–9 (5–8)	22 – Smith	7 – Matthews	6 – Matthews	Humphrey Coliseum (9,297); Starkville, MS
February 18, 2023; 2:30 p.m., SECN		at Ole Miss	W 69–61 ^{OT}	18–9 (6–8)	17 – Tied	12 – Smith	5 – Smith	SJB Pavilion (7,188); Oxford, MS
February 21, 2023; 6:00 p.m., SECN		at Missouri	L 64–66 ^{OT}	18–10 (6–9)	14 – Smith	10 – Smith	5 – Davis	Mizzou Arena (12,014); Columbia, MO
February 25, 2023; 2:30 p.m., SECN		No. 25 Texas A&M	W 69–62	19–10 (7–9)	17 – Smith	6 – Tied	4 – Matthews	Humphrey Coliseum (6,065); Starkville, MS
February 28, 2023; 8:00 p.m., SECN		South Carolina	W 74–68	20–10 (8–9)	20 – Moore	6 – Tied	6 – Davis	Humphrey Coliseum (7,280); Starkville, MS
March 4, 2023; 7:30 p.m., SECN		at Vanderbilt	L 72–77	20–11 (8–10)	27 – Smith	11 – Tied	2 – Tied	Memorial Gymnasium (10,544); Nashville, TN
SEC tournament
March 9, 2023; 12:00 p.m., SECN	(9)	vs. (8) Florida; Second round	W 69–68 ^{OT}	21–11	28 – Smith	12 – Smith	8 – Davis	Bridgestone Arena (13,165); Nashville, TN
March 10, 2023; 12:00 p.m., ESPN	(9)	vs. (1) No. 4 Alabama; Quarterfinals	L 49–72	21–12	17 – Smith	11 – Smith	1 – Tied	Bridgestone Arena (16,107); Nashville, TN
NCAA tournament
March 14, 2023*; 8:10 pm, TruTV	(11 MW)	vs. (11 MW) Pittsburgh; First Four	L 59–60	21–13	15 – Davis	13 – Jeffries	5 – Tied	UD Arena (12,453); Dayton, OH
*Non-conference game. ^{#}Rankings from AP Poll. (#) Tournament seedings in parentheses. All times are in Central Time.

== See also ==
- 2022–23 Mississippi State Bulldogs women's basketball team
