= 2022–23 South Carolina Gamecocks men's basketball team =

2022–23 South Carolina Gamecocks men's basketball
- Conference: Southeastern Conference
- Record: 11–21 (4–14 SEC)
- Head coach: Lamont Paris (1st season)
- Assistant coaches: Tanner Bronson; Tim Buckley; Eddie Shannon
- Home arena: Colonial Life Arena

2022–23 Southeastern Conference men's basketball standings
	Conf.				Overall
Team	W		L	PCT	W		L	PCT
No. 1 Alabama†	16	–	2	.889	31	–	6	.838
No. 17 Texas A&M	15	–	3	.833	25	–	10	.714
Kentucky	12	–	6	.667	22	–	12	.647
No. 23 Missouri	11	–	7	.611	25	–	10	.714
No. 20 Tennessee	11	–	7	.611	25	–	11	.694
Vanderbilt	11	–	7	.611	22	–	15	.595
Auburn	10	–	8	.556	21	–	13	.618
Florida	9	–	9	.500	16	–	17	.485
Mississippi State	8	–	10	.444	21	–	13	.618
Arkansas	8	–	10	.444	22	–	14	.611
Georgia	6	–	12	.333	16	–	16	.500
South Carolina	4	–	14	.222	11	–	21	.344
Ole Miss	3	–	15	.167	12	–	21	.364
LSU	2	–	16	.111	14	–	19	.424
† 2023 SEC tournament winner Rankings from AP poll

The 2022–23 South Carolina Gamecocks men's basketball team represented the University of South Carolina during the 2022–23 NCAA Division I men's basketball season. The team was led by first-year head coach Lamont Paris, and played their home games at Colonial Life Arena in Columbia, South Carolina as a member of the Southeastern Conference. They finished the season 11–20, 4–14 in SEC play to finish in twelfth place. As the No. 12 seed in the SEC tournament, they lost to Ole Miss in the first round.

== Previous season ==
The Gamecocks finished the 2021–22 season 18–13, 9–9 in SEC play to finish in a five-way tie for fifth place. As the No. 7 seed in the SEC tournament, they lost to Mississippi State in the second round.

On March 14, 2022, the school fired head coach Frank Martin. On March 24, the school named Chattanooga head coach Lamont Paris the team's new head coach.

== Offseason ==
=== Departures ===
Name	Number	Pos.	Height	Weight	Year	Hometown	Reason for departure
James Reese V	0	G	6'4"	170	GS Senior	Eastover, SC	Graduated
Jermaine Couisnard	5	G	6'4"	211	RS Junior	East Chicago, IN	Transferred to Oregon
Erik Stevenson	10	G	6'4"	209	Senior	Lacey, WA	Graduate transferred to West Virginia
AJ Wilson	12	F	6'7"	234	GS Senior	Laurel, MD	Graduated
Mike Green	13	G	6'2"	190	Junior	Myrtle Beach, SC	Walk-on; transferred to The Citadel
Brandon Martin	14	F	6'5"	232	Senior	Miami, FL	Graduate transferred to Massachusetts
Wildens Leveque	15	F/C	6'10"	255	Junior	Brockton, MA	Transferred to Massachusetts
Devin Carter	23	G	6'3"	188	Freshman	Miami, FL	Transferred to Providence
Keyshawn Bryant	24	F	6'6"	187	Senior	Winter Haven, FL	Transferred to South Florida
Ta'Quan Woodley	55	F	6'8"	280	Freshman	Camden, NJ	Transferred to Massachusetts

=== Incoming transfers ===
Name	Number	Pos.	Height	Weight	Year	Hometown	Previous school
Ebrima Dibba	0	G	6'6"	205	RS Senior	Bredäng, Skarholmen	Coastal Carolina
Meechie Johnson Jr.	5	G	6'2"	172	Junior	Cleveland, OH	Ohio State
Hayden Brown	10	F	6'5"	225	GS Senior	Greer, SC	The Citadel
Benjamin Bosmans-Verdonk	13	F	6'8"	235	RS Junior	Lommel, Belgium	Illinois

=== 2022 Recruiting class ===
College recruiting information
Name	Hometown	School	Height	Weight	Commit date
G. G. Jackson #1 PF	Columbia, SC	Ridge View High School	6 ft 8 in (2.03 m)	210 lb (95 kg)	Jul 22, 2022
G. G. Jackson #1 PF	Recruit ratings: Scout: Rivals: 247Sports: ESPN: (92)				
Zachary Davis; SF	Denmark, SC	Denmark-Olar High School	6 ft 7 in (2.01 m)	170 lb (77 kg)	Jun 21, 2021
Zachary Davis; SF	Recruit ratings: Scout: Rivals: 247Sports: ESPN: (NR)				
Daniel Hankins-Sanford; SF	Charlotte, NC	Julius L. Chambers	6 ft 8 in (2.03 m)	230 lb (100 kg)	Nov 9, 2021
Daniel Hankins-Sanford; SF	Recruit ratings: Scout: Rivals: 247Sports: ESPN: (NR)				
Overall recruit ranking:
Note: In many cases, Scout, Rivals, 247Sports, On3, and ESPN may conflict in their listings of height and weight.; In these cases, the average was taken. ESPN grades are on a 100-point scale.; Sources: "South Carolina 2022 Basketball Commitments". Rivals.; "2022 South Carolina Gamecocks Recruiting Class". ESPN.; "2022 Team Ranking". Rivals.

=== 2023 Recruiting class ===
College recruiting information (2023)
Name	Hometown	School	Height	Weight	Commit date
Arden Conyers; SF	Columbia, SC	Westwood High School	6 ft 7 in (2.01 m)	190 lb (86 kg)	Aug 8, 2022
Arden Conyers; SF	Recruit ratings: Scout: Rivals: 247Sports: ESPN: (NR)				
Collin Murray-Boyles; SF	Columbia, SC	A. C. Flora High School	6 ft 7 in (2.01 m)	200 lb (91 kg)	Aug 7, 2022
Collin Murray-Boyles; SF	Recruit ratings: Scout: Rivals: 247Sports: ESPN: (NR)				
Overall recruit ranking:
Note: In many cases, Scout, Rivals, 247Sports, On3, and ESPN may conflict in their listings of height and weight.; In these cases, the average was taken. ESPN grades are on a 100-point scale.; Sources: "South Carolina 2023 Basketball Commitments". Rivals.; "2023 South Carolina Gamecocks Recruiting Class". ESPN.; "2023 Team Ranking". Rivals.

== Roster ==
2022–23 South Carolina Gamecocks men's basketball team
Players
Coaches

Pos.	#	Name	Height	Weight	Year	Previous school	Hometown
G	0	Ebrima Dibba	6 ft 6 in (1.98 m)	214 lb (97 kg)	RS Sr	St. Benedict's Preparatory; Coastal Carolina	Bredäng, Sweden
G	1	Jacobi Wright	6 ft 2 in (1.88 m)	188 lb (85 kg)	So	Legacy Early College	Fort Mill, SC
G	2	Chico Carter Jr.	6 ft 3 in (1.91 m)	192 lb (87 kg)	Sr	Cardinal Newman HS; Murray State	Columbia, SC
C	4	Tre-Vaughn Minott	6 ft 9 in (2.06 m)	258 lb (117 kg)	Jr	NBA Academy Latin America	Montreal, QC
G	5	Meechie Johnson	6 ft 2 in (1.88 m)	180 lb (82 kg)	Jr	Garfield Heights HS; Ohio State	Cleveland, OH
F	10	Hayden Brown	6 ft 5 in (1.96 m)	234 lb (106 kg)	GS	Bynes HS; The Citadel	Greer, SC
G	12	Zachary Davis	6 ft 8 in (2.03 m)	190 lb (86 kg)	Fr	Denmark-Olar HS	Denmark, SC
G	14	Eli Sparkman (W)	6 ft 0 in (1.83 m)	153 lb (69 kg)	Fr	Baylor School	Cleveland, TN
F	21	Ja'Von Benson	6 ft 7 in (2.01 m)	253 lb (115 kg)	Jr	Ridge View HS	Columbia, SC
F	23	G. G. Jackson	6 ft 9 in (2.06 m)	215 lb (98 kg)	Fr	Ridge View HS	Columbia, SC
F	30	Daniel Hankins-Sanford	6 ft 8 in (2.03 m)	233 lb (106 kg)	Fr	Julius L. Chambers HS	Charlotte, NC
F	31	Benjamin Bosmans-Verdonk	6 ft 8 in (2.03 m)	250 lb (113 kg)	RS Jr	KA Pegasus; Illinois	Lommel, Belgium
C	33	Josh Gray	7 ft 0 in (2.13 m)	255 lb (116 kg)	Jr	Putnam Science Academy; LSU	Brooklyn, NY
G	44	Ford Cooper Jr. (W)	6 ft 3 in (1.91 m)	193 lb (88 kg)	Sr	United Faith Christian Academy; Missouri State	Charlotte, NC

Head coach

- Lamont Paris (Wooster)

Assistant coach(es)

- Tanner Bronson (Wisconsin)
- Tim Buckley (Bemidji State)
- Eddie Shannon (Florida)

Legend

- (C) Team captain
- (S) Suspended
- (I) Ineligible
- (W) Walk-on
- Injured
- Current redshirt

Roster

== Schedule and results ==
Date time, TV	Rank^{#}	Opponent^{#}	Result	Record	High points	High rebounds	High assists	Site (attendance) city, state
Exhibition
November 2, 2022*; 7:00 p.m.		Mars Hill	W 80–41		14 – Davis	7 – Jones	2 – Tied	Colonial Life Arena; Columbia, SC
Non-conference regular season
November 8, 2022*; 7:00 p.m., SECN		South Carolina State	W 80–77	1–0	21 – Brown	10 – Jackson II	4 – Wright	Colonial Life Arena (12,012); Columbia, SC
November 11, 2022*; 7:00 p.m., SECN+/ESPN+		Clemson; Rivalry	W 60–58	2–0	16 – Carter Jr.	10 – Gray	3 – Carter Jr.	Colonial Life Arena (13,380); Columbia, SC
November 17, 2022*; 5:00 p.m., ESPNU		vs. Colorado State; Charleston Classic Quarterfinals	L 53–85	2–1	20 – Jackson II	7 – Jackson II	4 – Johnson Jr.	TD Arena (5,017); Charleston, SC
November 18, 2022*; 7:30 p.m., ESPNews		vs. Davidson; Charleston Classic Consolation Round	L 60–69	2–2	26 – Carter Jr.	9 – Jackson II	2 – Tied	TD Arena (3,459); Charleston, SC
November 20, 2022*; 10:30 a.m., ESPNews		vs. Furman; Charleston Classic 7th Place Game	L 60–79	2–3	19 – Jackson II	6 – Jackson II	5 – Johnson	TD Arena (1,621); Charleston, SC
November 25, 2022*; 7:00 p.m., SECN+/ESPN+		USC Upstate	W 68–53	3–3	22 – Jackson II	9 – Brown	4 – Bosmans-Verdonk	Colonial Life Arena (9,347); Columbia, SC
November 30, 2022*; 9:00 p.m., CBSSN		at George Washington	L 55–79	3–4	13 – Carter Jr.	6 – Tied	4 – Wright	Charles E. Smith Center (2,216); Washington, D.C.
December 3, 2022*; 12:00 p.m., FS1		at Georgetown	W 74–71 ^{OT}	4–4	22 – Jackson	8 – Tied	8 – Johnson	Capital One Arena (5,391); Washington, D.C.
December 11, 2022*; 6:00 p.m., SECN+/ESPN+		Presbyterian	W 68–57	5–4	18 – Jackson II	7 – Gray	4 – Johnson	Colonial Life Arena (9,276); Columbia, SC
December 14, 2022*; 7:00 p.m., CBSSN		at UAB	L 70–84	5–5	20 – Jackson II	7 – Gray	7 – Johnson	Bartow Arena (5,126); Birmingham, AL
December 17, 2022*; 2:00 p.m., SECN+/ESPN+		vs. East Carolina; Greenville Classic	L 56–64	5–6	15 – Brown	7 – Gray	3 – Johnson	Bon Secours Wellness Arena (4,117); Greenville, SC
December 22, 2022*; 7:00 p.m., SECN		Western Kentucky	W 65–58	6–6	25 – Johnson	16 – Jackson II	3 – Tied	Colonial Life Arena (9,163); Columbia, SC
December 30, 2022*; 7:00 p.m., SECN+/ESPN+		Eastern Michigan	W 74–64	7–6	24 – Jackson II	9 – Jackson II	3 – Tied	Colonial Life Arena (9,023); Columbia, SC
SEC regular season
January 3, 2023; 7:00 p.m., SECN		at Vanderbilt	L 79–84 ^{OT}	7–7 (0–1)	24 – Carter Jr.	7 – Jackson II	3 – Tied	Memorial Gymnasium (6,344); Nashville, TN
January 7, 2023; 3:30 p.m., SECN		No. 8 Tennessee	L 42–85	7–8 (0–2)	19 – Johnson	5 – Gray	2 – Davis	Colonial Life Arena (10,704); Columbia, SC
January 10, 2023; 7:00 p.m., ESPN2		at Kentucky	W 71–68	8–8 (1–2)	26 – Johnson	6 – Johnson	6 – Johnson	Rupp Arena (19,393); Lexington, KY
January 14, 2023; 6:00 p.m., SECN		Texas A&M	L 53–94	8–9 (1–3)	13 – Davis	3 – Tied	3 – Johnson	Colonial Life Arena (10,883); Columbia, SC
January 17, 2023; 6:30 p.m., SECN		Ole Miss	L 58–70	8–10 (1–4)	15 – Jackson II	7 – Jackson II	3 – Jackson II	Colonial Life Arena (9,171); Columbia, SC
January 21, 2023; 3:30 p.m., SECN		No. 16 Auburn	L 66–81	8–11 (1–5)	30 – Jackson II	8 – Tied	5 – Johnson	Colonial Life Arena (13,048); Columbia, SC
January 25, 2023; 7:00 p.m., ESPN2		at Florida	L 60–81	8–12 (1–6)	20 – Jackson II	13 – Gray	2 – Tied	O'Connell Center (7,831); Gainesville, FL
January 28, 2023; 6:00 p.m., SECN		at Georgia	L 78–81 ^{OT}	8–13 (1–7)	18 – Jackson II	10 – Brown	5 – Johnson	Stegeman Coliseum (10,523); Athens, GA
January 31, 2023; 6:30 p.m., SECN		Mississippi State	L 51–66	8–14 (1–8)	15 – Jackson II	14 – Gray	2 – Tied	Colonial Life Arena (9,129); Columbia, MO
February 4, 2023; 3:30 p.m., SECN		Arkansas	L 63–65	8–15 (1–9)	20 – Tied	14 – Gray	4 – Tied	Colonial Life Arena (11,558); Columbia, SC
February 7, 2023; 9:00 p.m., SECN		at Missouri	L 74–83	8–16 (1–10)	23 – Jackson II	7 – Gray	5 – Johnson	Mizzou Arena (8,830); Columbia, MO
February 11, 2023; 1:00 p.m., SECN		at Ole Miss	W 64–61	9–16 (2–10)	18 – Brown	13 – Gray	4 – Wright	SJB Pavilion (5,928); Oxford, MS
February 14, 2023; 6:30 p.m., SECN		Vanderbilt	L 64–75	9–17 (2–11)	19 – Johnson	12 – Gray	3 – Tied	Colonial Life Arena (8,906); Columbia, SC
February 18, 2023; 1:00 p.m., SECN		at LSU	W 82–73	10–17 (3–11)	20 – Tied	8 – Jackson II	6 – Johnson	Pete Maravich Assembly Center (9,024); Baton Rouge, LA
February 22, 2023; 9:00 p.m., ESPN2		No. 2 Alabama	L 76–78 ^{OT}	10–18 (3–12)	19 – Jackson II	6 – Gray	4 – Johnson	Colonial Life Arena (11,242); Columbia, SC
February 25, 2023; 6:00 p.m., SECN		at No. 11 Tennessee	L 45–85	10–19 (3–13)	18 – Brown	10 – Gray	3 – Wright	Thompson–Boling Arena (20,273); Knoxville, TN
February 28, 2023; 9:00 p.m., SECN		at Mississippi State	L 68–74	10–20 (3–14)	22 – Jackson II	8 – Jackson II	4 – Johnson	Humphrey Coliseum (7,280); Starkville, MS
March 4, 2023; 1:00 p.m., SECN		Georgia	W 61–55	11–20 (4–14)	18 – Johnson	13 – Gray	7 – Johnson	Colonial Life Arena (10,211); Columbia, SC
SEC tournament
March 8, 2023; 7:00 p.m., SECN	(12)	vs. (13) Ole Miss; First round	L 61–67	11–21	24 – Jackson II	6 – Gray	5 – Johnson	Bridgestone Arena (14,326); Nashville, TN
*Non-conference game. ^{#}Rankings from AP Poll. (#) Tournament seedings in parentheses. All times are in Eastern Time.

== See also ==
- 2022–23 South Carolina Gamecocks women's basketball team
