= 2022–23 LSU Tigers men's basketball team =

American college basketball season

2022–23 LSU Tigers men's basketball
- Conference: Southeastern Conference
- Record: 14–19 (2–16 SEC)
- Head coach: Matt McMahon (1st season)
- Assistant coaches: Casey Long; Ronnie Hamilton; Cody Toppert
- Home arena: Pete Maravich Assembly Center

2022–23 Southeastern Conference men's basketball standings
	Conf.				Overall
Team	W		L	PCT	W		L	PCT
No. 1 Alabama†	16	–	2	.889	31	–	6	.838
No. 17 Texas A&M	15	–	3	.833	25	–	10	.714
Kentucky	12	–	6	.667	22	–	12	.647
No. 23 Missouri	11	–	7	.611	25	–	10	.714
No. 20 Tennessee	11	–	7	.611	25	–	11	.694
Vanderbilt	11	–	7	.611	22	–	15	.595
Auburn	10	–	8	.556	21	–	13	.618
Florida	9	–	9	.500	16	–	17	.485
Mississippi State	8	–	10	.444	21	–	13	.618
Arkansas	8	–	10	.444	22	–	14	.611
Georgia	6	–	12	.333	16	–	16	.500
South Carolina	4	–	14	.222	11	–	21	.344
Ole Miss	3	–	15	.167	12	–	21	.364
LSU	2	–	16	.111	14	–	19	.424
† 2023 SEC tournament winner Rankings from AP poll

The 2022–23 LSU Tigers basketball team represented Louisiana State University during the 2022–23 NCAA Division I men's basketball season. The team's head coach was Matt McMahon, in his first season at LSU. The Tigers played their home games at Pete Maravich Assembly Center in Baton Rouge, Louisiana as a member of the Southeastern Conference. They finished the season 13–18, 2–16 in SEC play to finish in last place, despite starting the season with an impressive 12–1 run. As the 14th seed in the SEC tournament, the Tigers defeated Georgia in the first round before falling to Vanderbilt in the second round. LSU did not participate in any postseason play.

== Previous season ==
The Tigers finished the season 22–12, 9–9 in SEC Play to finish a five-way tie for fifth place. As the No. 5 seed in the SEC tournament, they defeated Missouri in the Second Round, before losing in the quarterfinals to Arkansas. They received an at-large bid to the NCAA tournament as the No. 6 seed in the Midwest Region, where they were upset in the First Round by Iowa State.

Following the team's loss in the SEC Tournament, the school fired head coach Will Wade after receiving notification of significant NCAA violations by Wade. Assistant coach Kevin Nickelberry coached the team in their NCAA Tournament game. On March 21, 2022, the school named Murray State head coach Matt McMahon the team's new head coach.

== Offseason ==
=== Departures ===
Name	Number	Pos.	Height	Weight	Year	Hometown	Reason for departure
Brandon Murray	0	G	6'5"	214	Freshman	Baltimore, MD	Transferred to Georgetown
Xavier Pinson	1	G	6'2"	154	Senior	Chicago, IL	Graduate transferred to New Mexico State
Eric Gaines	2	G	6'2"	150	Sophomore	Lithonia, GA	Transferred to UAB
Alex Fudge	3	F	6'8"	185	Freshman	Jacksonville, FL	Transferred to Florida
Darius Days	4	F	6'7"	245	Senior	Raleigh, FL	Graduated/went undrafted in 2022 NBA draft
Tari Eason	13	F	6'8"	216	Sophomore	Seattle, WA	Declared for 2022 NBA draft/selected 17th overall by Houston Rockets
Efton Reid	15	C	7'0"	238	Freshman	Richmond, VA	Transferred to Gonzaga
Jerrell Colbert	20	C	6'10"	216	Freshman	Houston, TX	Transferred to Kansas State
Bradley Ezewiro	21	F	6'8"	246	Freshman	Torrance, CA	Transferred to Georgetown
Spencer Mays	22	G	6'3"	196	Junior	Baton Rouge, LA	Walk-on; not on team roster
Shareef O'Neal	24	F	6'10"	220	RS Junior	Los Angeles, CA	Declared for 2022 NBA draft/went undrafted

=== Incoming transfers ===
Name	Number	Pos.	Height	Weight	Year	Hometown	Previous School
Trae Hannibal	0	G	6'2"	220	Junior	Elliott, SC	Murray State
Cam Hayes	1	G	6'3"	180	Junior	Greensboro, NC	NC State
Justice Hill	3	G	6'0"	170	Junior	Little Rock, AR	Murray State
Kendal Coleman	4	C	6'8"	220	Sophomore	Shreveport, LA	Northwestern State
KJ Williams	12	F	6'10"	245	Senior	Cleveland, MS	Murray State
Derek Fountain	20	F	6'9"	220	Junior	Holly Springs, MS	Mississippi State

=== 2022 recruiting class ===
College recruiting information
Name	Hometown	School	Height	Weight	Commit date
Tyrell Ward #7 SF	Hyattsville, MD	DeMatha Catholic High School	6 ft 6 in (1.98 m)	185 lb (84 kg)	May 1, 2022
Tyrell Ward #7 SF	Recruit ratings: Scout: Rivals: 247Sports: ESPN: (89)				
Jalen Reed #15 C	Los Angeles, CA	Southern California Academy	6 ft 9 in (2.06 m)	230 lb (100 kg)	May 17, 2022
Jalen Reed #15 C	Recruit ratings: Scout: Rivals: 247Sports: ESPN: (82)				
Shawn Phillips #67 C	Hudson, NC	Moravian Prep	6 ft 9 in (2.06 m)	200 lb (91 kg)	Apr 28, 2022
Shawn Phillips #67 C	Recruit ratings: Scout: Rivals: 247Sports: ESPN: (81)				
Corneilous Williams #17 C	Dayton, OH	Dream City Christian	6 ft 9 in (2.06 m)	250 lb (110 kg)	May 2, 2022
Corneilous Williams #17 C	Recruit ratings: Scout: Rivals: 247Sports: ESPN: (78)				
Overall recruit ranking:
Note: In many cases, Scout, Rivals, 247Sports, On3, and ESPN may conflict in their listings of height and weight.; In these cases, the average was taken. ESPN grades are on a 100-point scale.; Sources: "LSU 2022 Basketball Commitments". Rivals.; "2022 LSU Basketball Commits". Scout.; "ESPN". ESPN.; "Scout.com Team Recruiting Rankings". Scout.; "2022 Team Ranking". Rivals.

=== 2023 Recruiting class ===
College recruiting information (2023)
Name	Hometown	School	Height	Weight	Commit date
Corey Chest #30 PF	New Orleans, LA	Link Academy	6 ft 8 in (2.03 m)	210 lb (95 kg)	Aug 16, 2022
Corey Chest #30 PF	Recruit ratings: Scout: Rivals: 247Sports: ESPN: (82)				
Overall recruit ranking:
Note: In many cases, Scout, Rivals, 247Sports, On3, and ESPN may conflict in their listings of height and weight.; In these cases, the average was taken. ESPN grades are on a 100-point scale.; Sources: "LSU 2023 Basketball Commitments". Rivals.; "2023 LSU Basketball Commits". Scout.; "ESPN". ESPN.; "Scout.com Team Recruiting Rankings". Scout.; "2023 Team Ranking". Rivals.

== Roster ==
2022–23 LSU Tigers men's basketball team
Players
Coaches

Pos.	#	Name	Height	Weight	Year	Previous school	Hometown
G	0	Trae Hannibal	6 ft 2 in (1.88 m)	215 lb (98 kg)	Jr	Murray State	Elliott, SC
G	1	Cam Hayes	6 ft 3 in (1.91 m)	180 lb (82 kg)	Jr	NC State	Greensboro, NC
F	2	Corneilous Williams	6 ft 9 in (2.06 m)	210 lb (95 kg)	Fr	Combine Academy	Meridian, MS
G	3	Justice Hill	6 ft 0 in (1.83 m)	175 lb (79 kg)	Jr	Murray State	Little Rock, AR
C	4	Kendal Coleman	6 ft 8 in (2.03 m)	230 lb (104 kg)	So	Northwestern State	Shreveport, LA
F	5	Mwani Wilkinson	6 ft 5 in (1.96 m)	205 lb (93 kg)	Jr	Bishop Gorman HS	Las Vegas, NV
G	10	Brandon Egemo (W)	6 ft 1 in (1.85 m)	175 lb (79 kg)	Jr	University HS	Los Angeles, CA
G	11	Justice Williams	6 ft 4 in (1.93 m)	175 lb (79 kg)	So	Montverde Academy	Philadelphia, PA
F	12	KJ Williams	6 ft 10 in (2.08 m)	250 lb (113 kg)	Sr	Murray State	Cleveland, MS
F	13	Jalen Reed	6 ft 10 in (2.08 m)	230 lb (104 kg)	Fr	Southern California Academy	Jackson, MS
F	15	Tyrell Ward	6 ft 6 in (1.98 m)	185 lb (84 kg)	Fr	DeMatha Catholic HS	Washington, D.C.
F	20	Derek Fountain	6 ft 9 in (2.06 m)	225 lb (102 kg)	Jr	Mississippi State	Holly Springs, MS
F	21	Austin Montgomery (W)	6 ft 4 in (1.93 m)	180 lb (82 kg)	Fr	Isidore Newman School	New Orleans, LA
F	25	Adam Benhayoune (W)	6 ft 5 in (1.96 m)	225 lb (102 kg)	So	Sandra Day O'Connor HS	Helotes, TX
G	30	Parker Edwards (W)	6 ft 2 in (1.88 m)	220 lb (100 kg)	RS Sr	Southeastern Louisiana	Covington, LA
C	34	Shawn Phillips	7 ft 0 in (2.13 m)	245 lb (111 kg)	Fr	Dream City Christian School	Dayton, OH
G	44	Adam Miller	6 ft 3 in (1.91 m)	190 lb (86 kg)	RS So	Illinois	Peoria, IL

Head coach

- Matt McMahon (Appalachian State)

Assistant coach(es)

- Casey Long (Chattanooga)
- Ronnie Hamilton (UNC Pembroke)
- Cody Toppert (Cornell)

Legend

- (C) Team captain
- (S) Suspended
- (I) Ineligible
- (W) Walk-on
- Injured
- Current redshirt

Roster

== Schedule and results ==
Date time, TV	Rank^{#}	Opponent^{#}	Result	Record	High points	High rebounds	High assists	Site (attendance) city, state
Regular season
November 9, 2022*; 7:00 p.m., SECN+		Kansas City	W 74–63	1–0	18 – Miller	14 – K. Williams	7 – Hill	Pete Maravich Assembly Center (9,338); Baton Rouge, LA
November 12, 2022*; 5:00 p.m., SECN+		Arkansas State	W 61–52	2–0	26 – Miller	6 – Wilkinson	3 – Hill	Pete Maravich Assembly Center (9,011); Baton Rouge, LA
November 17, 2022*; 7:00 p.m., SECN+		New Orleans	W 91–62	3–0	15 – Fountain	8 – Fountain	5 – Hill	Pete Maravich Assembly Center (9,224); Baton Rouge, LA
November 21, 2022*; 10:00 a.m., FloSports		vs. Illinois State; Cayman Islands Classic quarterfinals	W 77–61	4–0	33 – K. Williams	8 – K. Williams	5 – Hill	John Gray Gymnasium; George Town, Cayman Islands
November 22, 2022*; 12:30 p.m., FloSports		vs. Akron; Cayman Islands Classic semifinals	W 73–58	5–0	23 – Miller	5 – Tied	3 – Tied	John Gray Gymnasium; George Town, Cayman Islands
November 23, 2022*; 6:30 p.m., FloSports		vs. Kansas State; Cayman Islands Classic championship	L 59–61	5–1	17 – K. Williams	10 – K. Williams	4 – Hannibal	John Gray Gymnasium (2,400); George Town, Cayman Islands
November 27, 2022*; 2:00 p.m., SECN+		Wofford	W 78–75	6–1	26 – Miller	5 – Tied	2 – Tied	Pete Maravich Assembly Center (8,428); Baton Rouge, LA
December 2, 2022*; 7:00 p.m., SECN+		UT Arlington	W 63–59	7–1	14 – K. Williams	9 – K. Williams	9 – Hill	Pete Maravich Assembly Center (9,145); Baton Rouge, LA
December 10, 2022*; 1:00 p.m., ESPNU		vs. Wake Forest; Holiday Hoopsgiving	W 72–70	8–1	35 – K. Williams	10 – K. Williams	6 – Tied	State Farm Arena (7,795); Atlanta, GA
December 13, 2022*; 6:00 p.m., SECN		North Carolina Central	W 67–57	9–1	18 – K. Williams	14 – Fountain	4 – Tied	Pete Maravich Assembly Center (8,212); Baton Rouge, LA
December 17, 2022*; 6:00 p.m., SECN		Winthrop	W 89–81	10–1	25 – Hayes	7 – Tied	6 – Hannibal	Pete Maravich Assembly Center (9,067); Baton Rouge, LA
December 21, 2022*; 7:00 p.m., SECN+		East Tennessee State	W 72–68	11–1	28 – K. Williams	12 – K. Williams	5 – Hill	Pete Maravich Assembly Center (9,059); Baton Rouge, LA
December 28, 2022; 8:00 p.m., ESPN2		No. 9 Arkansas	W 60–57	12–1 (1–0)	19 – Hannibal	10 – Fountain	3 – Hayes	Pete Maravich Assembly Center (10,428); Baton Rouge, LA
January 3, 2023; 7:00 p.m., ESPN		at Kentucky	L 71–74	12–2 (1–1)	23 – K. Williams	8 – Fountain	4 – Hannibal	Rupp Arena (19,610); Lexington, KY
January 7, 2023; 5:00 p.m., SECN		at Texas A&M	L 56–69	12–3 (1–2)	16 – Miler	8 – K. Williams	4 – Hannibal	Reed Arena (9,319); College Station, TX
January 10, 2023; 6:00 p.m., SECN		Florida	L 56–76	12–4 (1–3)	23 – K. Williams	12 – Hannibal	6 – Hill	Pete Maravich Assembly Center (9,159); Baton Rouge, LA
January 14, 2023; 3:00 p.m., ESPN		at No. 4 Alabama	L 66–106	12–5 (1–4)	10 – Tied	7 – Reed	5 – J. Williams	Coleman Coliseum (13,474); Tuscaloosa, AL
January 18, 2023; 6:00 p.m., ESPN2		No. 16 Auburn	L 49–67	12–6 (1–5)	16 – Tied	8 – K. Williams	3 – Miller	Pete Maravich Assembly Center (9,967); Baton Rouge, LA
January 21, 2023; 3:00 p.m., ESPN		No. 9 Tennessee	L 56–77	12–7 (1–6)	16 – K. Williams	5 – Reed	4 – Tied	Pete Maravich Assembly Center (10,462); Baton Rouge, LA
January 24, 2023; 6:00 p.m., ESPN2		at Arkansas	L 40–60	12–8 (1–7)	9 – Tied	11 – K. Williams	2 – J. Williams	Bud Walton Arena (19,200); Fayetteville, AR
January 28, 2023*; 1:00 p.m., ESPNU		Texas Tech; Big 12/SEC Challenge	L 68–76	12–9	20 – Miller	9 – K. Williams	4 – J. Williams	Pete Maravich Assembly Center (9,939); Baton Rouge, LA
February 1, 2023; 8:00 p.m., SECN		at Missouri	L 77–87	12–10 (1–8)	15 – K. Williams	11 – Tied	5 – Hannibal	Mizzou Arena (12,769); Columbia, MO
February 4, 2023; 3:00 p.m., ESPNU		No. 4 Alabama	L 69–79	12–11 (1–9)	26 – Fountain	8 – Tied	4 – J. Williams	Pete Maravich Assembly Center (9,652); Baton Rouge, LA
February 8, 2023; 8:00 p.m., SECN		at Mississippi State	L 53–64	12–12 (1–10)	11 – K. Williams	5 – Tied	3 – Tied	Humphrey Coliseum (7,070); Starkville, MS
February 11, 2023; 7:30 p.m., SECN		Texas A&M	L 62–74	12–13 (1–11)	18 – Miller	5 – Reed	3 – Hayes	Pete Maravich Assembly Center (10,328); Baton Rouge, LA
February 14, 2023; 7:30 p.m., SECN		at Georgia	L 63–65	12–14 (1–12)	18 – Williams	9 – Williams	3 – Hayes	Stegeman Coliseum (6,991); Athens, GA
February 18, 2023; 12:00 p.m., SECN		South Carolina	L 73–82	12–15 (1–13)	25 – Hayes	8 – Hayes	4 – Hayes	Pete Maravich Assembly Center (9,024); Baton Rouge, LA
February 22, 2023; 6:00 p.m., SECN		Vanderbilt	W 84–77	13–15 (2–13)	35 – K. Williams	10 – K. Williams	4 – Hill	Pete Maravich Assembly Center (8,827); Baton Rouge, LA
February 25, 2023; 7:30 p.m., SECN		at Ole Miss	L 69–82	13–16 (2–14)	29 – K. Williams	5 – Tied	5 – Tied	SJB Pavilion (6,304); Oxford, MS
March 1, 2023; 8:00 p.m., SECN		Missouri	L 76–81	13–17 (2–15)	24 – K. Williams	14 – K. Williams	4 – Hayes	Pete Maravich Assembly Center (8,453); Baton Rouge, LA
March 4, 2023; 5:00 p.m., SECN		at Florida	L 67–79	13–18 (2–16)	19 – K. Williams	12 – Fountain	3 – Reed	O'Connell Center (10,280); Gainesville, FL
SEC Tournament
March 8, 2023; 8:00 p.m., SECN	(14)	vs. (11) Georgia; First round	W 72–67	14–18	18 – Williams	11 – Hannibal	4 – Williams	Bridgestone Arena (14,326); Nashville, TN
March 9, 2023; 8:30 p.m., SECN	(14)	vs. (6) Vanderbilt; Second round	L 68–77	14–19	26 – K. Williams	13 – Hannibal	4 – Hannibal	Bridgestone Arena (14,583); Nashville, TN
*Non-conference game. ^{#}Rankings from AP Poll. (#) Tournament seedings in parentheses. All times are in Central Time.

Schedule Source

== Rankings ==
Ranking movements
	Week																				
Poll	Pre	1	2	3	4	5	6	7	8	9	10	11	12	13	14	15	16	17	18	19	Final
AP																					Not released
Coaches																					

*AP does not release post-NCAA Tournament rankings

== See also ==
- 2022–23 LSU Tigers women's basketball team
