= 2022–23 Vanderbilt Commodores men's basketball team =

American college basketball season

2022–23 Vanderbilt Commodores men's basketball

NIT, Quarterfinals
- Conference: Southeastern Conference
- Record: 22–15 (11–7 SEC)
- Head coach: Jerry Stackhouse (4th season)
- Assistant coaches: Michael Curry; Adam Mazarei; Andy Fox
- Home arena: Memorial Gymnasium

2022–23 Southeastern Conference men's basketball standings
	Conf.				Overall
Team	W		L	PCT	W		L	PCT
No. 1 Alabama†	16	–	2	.889	31	–	6	.838
No. 17 Texas A&M	15	–	3	.833	25	–	10	.714
Kentucky	12	–	6	.667	22	–	12	.647
No. 23 Missouri	11	–	7	.611	25	–	10	.714
No. 20 Tennessee	11	–	7	.611	25	–	11	.694
Vanderbilt	11	–	7	.611	22	–	15	.595
Auburn	10	–	8	.556	21	–	13	.618
Florida	9	–	9	.500	16	–	17	.485
Mississippi State	8	–	10	.444	21	–	13	.618
Arkansas	8	–	10	.444	22	–	14	.611
Georgia	6	–	12	.333	16	–	16	.500
South Carolina	4	–	14	.222	11	–	21	.344
Ole Miss	3	–	15	.167	12	–	21	.364
LSU	2	–	16	.111	14	–	19	.424
† 2023 SEC tournament winner Rankings from AP poll

The 2022–23 Vanderbilt Commodores men's basketball team represented Vanderbilt University during the 2022–23 NCAA Division I men's basketball season. The team was led by fourth-year head coach Jerry Stackhouse, and played their home games at Memorial Gymnasium in Nashville, Tennessee as a member of the Southeastern Conference. They finished the season 18–13, 11–7 in SEC Play, in a three-way tie for 4th place. They defeated LSU and Kentucky to advance to the semifinals of the SEC tournament, where they were defeated by Texas A&M. They received an at-large bid to the National Invitation Tournament where they defeated Yale and Michigan to advance to the quarterfinals where they lost to UAB.

== Previous season ==
The Commodores finished the 2021–22 season 19–16, 7–11 in SEC Play to finish in 11th place. They defeated Georgia and Alabama to advance to the quarterfinals of the SEC tournament where they lost to Kentucky. They received an at-large bid to the National Invitation Tournament where they defeated Belmont and Dayton before losing to Xavier in the quarterfinals.

== Offseason ==
=== Departures ===
Name	Number	Pos.	Height	Weight	Year	Hometown	Reason for Leaving
Peyton Daniels	1	G	6'2"	185	Freshman	Ellenwood, GA	Transferred to Jacksonville State
Scotty Pippen Jr.	2	G	6'3"	185	Junior	Los Angeles, CA	Declare for 2022 NBA draft
Rodney Chatman	3	G	6'1"	215	GS Senior	Lithonia, GA	Graduated
Shane Dezonie	5	G	6'5"	215	Freshman	Tobyhanna, PA	Transferred to Temple
Gabe Dorsey	11	G/F	6'6"	215	Freshman	Westminster, MD	Transferred to William & Mary
Terren Frank	15	F	6'8"	240	Sophomore	Los Angeles, CA	Transferred to Idaho
Max Adelman	20	G/F	6'5"	205	Sophomore	Memphis, TN	Walk-on; transferred
Jamaine Mann	23	G	6'6"	230	Sophomore	Hampton, GA	Transferred to Georgia State
Drew Weikert	33	G	6'0"	170	Senior	Nashville, TN	Walk-on; left the team to attend law school

=== Incoming transfers ===
Name	Number	Pos.	Height	Weight	Year	Hometown	Previous school
Ezra Manjon	5	G	5'11"	170	Junior	Antioch, CA	UC Davis
Emmanuel Ansong	20	F	6'4"	195	Senior	Bordentown, NJ	Green Bay

=== Recruiting classes ===
==== 2022 recruiting class ====
College recruiting
Name	Hometown	School	Height	Weight	Commit date
Lee Dort #19 C	Addison, TX	Greenhill High School	6 ft 9 in (2.06 m)	235 lb (107 kg)	Apr 7, 2021
Lee Dort #19 C	Recruit ratings: Rivals: 247Sports: ESPN: (82)				
Noah Shelby #19 PG	Dallas, TX	Greenhill High School	6 ft 3 in (1.91 m)	175 lb (79 kg)	Apr 7, 2021
Noah Shelby #19 PG	Recruit ratings: Rivals: 247Sports: ESPN: (82)				
Colin Smith #22 PF	Dallas, TX	Saint Mark's School	6 ft 7 in (2.01 m)	200 lb (91 kg)	Oct 10, 2021
Colin Smith #22 PF	Recruit ratings: Rivals: 247Sports: ESPN: (82)				
Malik Dia #55 PF	Nashville, TN	The Ensworth School	6 ft 7 in (2.01 m)	190 lb (86 kg)	Sep 5, 2021
Malik Dia #55 PF	Recruit ratings: Rivals: 247Sports: ESPN: (80)				
Paul Lewis #69 PG	Arlington, VA	Bishop O'Connell High School	6 ft 1 in (1.85 m)	165 lb (75 kg)	Apr 18, 2022
Paul Lewis #69 PG	Recruit ratings: Rivals: 247Sports: ESPN: (75)				
Overall recruit ranking:
Note: In many cases, Scout, Rivals, 247Sports, On3, and ESPN may conflict in their listings of height and weight.; In these cases, the average was taken. ESPN grades are on a 100-point scale.; Sources: "Vanderbilt 2022 Basketball Commitments". Rivals.; "ESPN". ESPN.; "2022 Team Ranking". Rivals.

==== 2023 recruiting class ====
College recruiting (2023)
Name	Hometown	School	Height	Weight	Commit date
Isaiah West #18 PG	Nashville, TN	Goodpasture Christian High School	6 ft 2 in (1.88 m)	185 lb (84 kg)	Jun 29, 2022
Isaiah West #18 PG	Recruit ratings: Rivals: 247Sports: ESPN: (84)				
JaQualon Roberts #22 PF	Bloomington, IN	Bloomington North High School	6 ft 6 in (1.98 m)	205 lb (93 kg)	Aug 4, 2022
JaQualon Roberts #22 PF	Recruit ratings: Rivals: 247Sports: ESPN: (81)				
Carter Lang #38 C	Charlottesville, VA	St. Anne's-Belfield School	6 ft 8 in (2.03 m)	245 lb (111 kg)	Sep 12, 2022
Carter Lang #38 C	Recruit ratings: Rivals: 247Sports: ESPN: (80)				
Overall recruit ranking:
Note: In many cases, Scout, Rivals, 247Sports, On3, and ESPN may conflict in their listings of height and weight.; In these cases, the average was taken. ESPN grades are on a 100-point scale.; Sources: "Vanderbilt 2023 Basketball Commitments". Rivals.; "ESPN". ESPN.; "2023 Team Ranking". Rivals.

== Roster ==
2022–23 Vanderbilt Commodores men's basketball team
Players
Coaches

Pos.	#	Name	Height	Weight	Year	Previous school	Hometown
G	0	Tyrin Lawrence	6 ft 4 in (1.93 m)	200 lb (91 kg)	Jr	Morgan County HS	Monticello, GA
F	1	Colin Smith	6 ft 8 in (2.03 m)	210 lb (95 kg)	Fr	Compass Prep (AZ)	Dallas, TX
G	2	Noah Shelby	6 ft 3 in (1.91 m)	180 lb (82 kg)	Fr	Greenhill School	McKinney, TX
G	3	Paul Lewis	6 ft 2 in (1.88 m)	170 lb (77 kg)	Fr	Bishop O'Connell HS	Woodbrige, VA
G/F	4	Jordan Wright	6 ft 6 in (1.98 m)	220 lb (100 kg)	Sr	The Dunham School	Baton Rouge, LA
G	5	Ezra Manjon	6 ft 0 in (1.83 m)	170 lb (77 kg)	Sr	UC Davis	Antioch, CA
F	10	Myles Stute	6 ft 7 in (2.01 m)	215 lb (98 kg)	Jr	Gonzaga College HS	Washington, D.C.
G	11	Adrian Samuels	6 ft 5 in (1.96 m)	170 lb (77 kg)	Fr	University School of Nashville	Nashville, TN
G	12	Trey Thomas	6 ft 0 in (1.83 m)	160 lb (73 kg)	Jr	Crestwood Prep	Durham, ON
F	20	Emmanuel Ansong	6 ft 4 in (1.93 m)	195 lb (88 kg)	Sr	Green Bay	Bordentown, NJ
C	21	Liam Robbins	7 ft 0 in (2.13 m)	250 lb (113 kg)	GS	Minnesota	Davenport, IA
G	22	Graham Calton (W)	6 ft 6 in (1.98 m)	200 lb (91 kg)	So	Charlotte Latin School	Charlotte, NC
F	23	Malik Dia	6 ft 9 in (2.06 m)	240 lb (109 kg)	Fr	Ensworth School	Murfreesboro, TN
G	25	Miles Keeffe (W)	6 ft 5 in (1.96 m)	185 lb (84 kg)	Fr	Southern California Academy	Novato, CA
F	34	Lee Dort	6 ft 10 in (2.08 m)	250 lb (113 kg)	Fr	Greenhill School	McKinney, TX
F	42	Quentin Millora-Brown	6 ft 10 in (2.08 m)	245 lb (111 kg)	RS Sr	Rice	Lorton, VA

Head coach

- Jerry Stackhouse (North Carolina)

Assistant coach(es)

- Michael Curry (Georgia Southern)
- Adam Mazarei (Redlands)
- Andy Fox (Tennessee)

Legend

- (C) Team captain
- (S) Suspended
- (I) Ineligible
- (W) Walk-on
- Injured
- Current redshirt

Roster

== Schedule and results ==
Date time, TV	Rank^{#}	Opponent^{#}	Result	Record	High points	High rebounds	High assists	Site (attendance) city, state
Non-conference regular season
November 7, 2022*; 7:00 p.m., SECN+		Memphis	L 67–76	0–1	14 – Lawrence	5 – Ansong	5 – Wright	Memorial Gymnasium (10,380); Nashville, TN
November 11, 2022*; 6:00 p.m., SECN+		Southern Miss	L 48–60	0–2	12 – Wright	11 – Stute	2 – Ansong	Memorial Gymnasium (6,175); Nashville, TN
November 15, 2022*; 6:00 p.m., ESPN+		at Temple	W 89–87 ^{OT}	1–2	21 – Stute	6 – Tied	9 – Manjon	Liacouras Center (4,491); Philadelphia, PA
November 18, 2022*; 6:00 p.m., SECN+		Morehead State	W 76–43	2–2	17 – Lawrence	7 – Robbins	2 – Tied	Memorial Gymnasium (5,732); Nashville, TN
November 23, 2022*; 11:00 p.m., ESPN2		vs. Saint Mary's; Wooden Legacy semifinals	L 65–75	2–3	22 – Wright	8 – Stute	3 – Wright	Anaheim Convention Center (2,483); Anaheim, CA
November 24, 2022*; 9:00 p.m., ESPNU		vs. Fresno State; Wooden Legacy 3rd place game	W 67–59	3–3	20 – Robbins	7 – Robbins	6 – Manjon	Anaheim Convention Center (621); Anaheim, CA
November 30, 2022*; 6:00 p.m., CBSSN		at VCU	L 65–70	3–4	20 – Stute	7 – Millora-Brown	4 – Manjon	Siegel Center (7,117); Richmond, VA
December 3, 2022*; 4:00 p.m., SECN+		Wofford	W 65–62	4–4	14 – Robbins	9 – Robbins	3 – Tied	Memorial Gymnasium (5,822); Nashville, TN
December 7, 2022*; 8:00 p.m., SECN		Pittsburgh	W 75–74	5–4	14 – Tied	9 – Robbins	6 – Wright	Memorial Gymnasium (5,616); Nashville, TN
December 9, 2022*; 6:00 p.m., SECN		Grambling State	L 62–64	5–5	15 – Lawrence	8 – Smith	4 – Thomas	Memorial Gymnasium (5,236); Nashville, TN
December 17, 2022*; 9:30 p.m., CBSSN		vs. NC State; Legends of Basketball Showcase	L 66–70	5–6	16 – Stute	4 – Tied	3 – Lawrence	United Center (5,578); Chicago, IL
December 22, 2022*; 7:00 p.m., SECN+		Alabama A&M	W 70–62	6–6	14 – Robbins	9 – Robbins	4 – Wright	Memorial Gymnasium (5,010); Nashville, TN
December 30, 2022*; 6:00 p.m., SECN+		Southeastern Louisiana	W 93–55	7–6	12 – Shelby	11 – Robbins	3 – Tied	Memorial Gymnasium (5,384); Nashville, TN
SEC regular season
January 3, 2023; 6:00 p.m., SECN		South Carolina	W 84–79 ^{OT}	8–6 (1–0)	24 – Manjon	8 – Stute	4 – Robbins	Memorial Gymnasium (6,344); Nashville, TN
January 7, 2023; 11:00 a.m., CBS		at No. 20 Missouri	L 82–85	8–7 (1–1)	16 – Robbins	7 – Tied	7 – Manjon	Mizzou Arena (15,061); Columbia, MO
January 10, 2023; 8:00 p.m., SECN		at No. 5 Tennessee	L 68–77	8–8 (1–2)	18 – Robbins	7 – Stute	2 – Smith	Thompson–Boling Arena (16,255); Knoxville, TN
January 14, 2023; 1:00 p.m., ESPNU		No. 15 Arkansas	W 97–84	9–8 (2–2)	22 – Lawrence	7 – Stute	3 – Stute	Memorial Gymnasium (9,362); Nashville, TN
January 17, 2023; 7:30 p.m., SECN		No. 4 Alabama	L 66–78	9–9 (2–3)	20 – Lawrence	6 – Wright	3 – Tied	Memorial Gymnasium (10,517); Nashville, TN
January 21, 2023; 12:00 p.m., SECN		at Georgia	W 85–82	10–9 (3–3)	19 – Manjon	11 – Millora-Brown	3 – Thomas	Stegeman Coliseum (10,523); Athens, GA
January 24, 2023; 8:00 p.m., SECN		Kentucky	L 53–69	10–10 (3–4)	14 – Dia	4 – Tied	3 – Manjon	Memorial Gymnasium (10,238); Nashville, TN
January 28, 2023; 7:30 p.m., SECN		at Texas A&M	L 66–72	10–11 (3–5)	22 – Stute	6 – Millora-Brown	8 – Manjon	Reed Arena (12,646); College Station, TX
January 31, 2023; 7:30 p.m., SECN		at No. 4 Alabama	L 44–101	10–12 (3–6)	10 – Lewis	7 – Tied	2 – Tied	Coleman Coliseum (9,513); Tuscaloosa, AL
February 4, 2023; 12:00 p.m., SECN		Ole Miss	W 74–71	11–12 (4–6)	19 – Robbins	12 – Robbins	7 – Manjon	Memorial Gymnasium (7,237); Nashville, TN
February 8, 2023; 6:00 p.m., SECN		No. 6 Tennessee	W 66–65	12–12 (5–6)	19 – Lawrence	9 – Robbins	5 – Manjon	Memorial Gymnasium (10,483); Nashville, TN
February 11, 2023; 2:30 p.m., SECN		at Florida	W 88–80	13–12 (6–6)	32 – Robbins	10 – Tied	8 – Manjon	O'Connell Center (10,024); Gainesville, FL
February 14, 2023; 5:30 p.m., SECN		at South Carolina	W 75–64	14–12 (7–6)	24 – Robbins	8 – Tied	6 – Manjon	Colonial Life Arena (8,906); Columbia, SC
February 18, 2023; 7:30 p.m., SECN		Auburn	W 67–65	15–12 (8–6)	24 – Robbins	12 – Robbins	5 – Manjon	Memorial Gymnasium (14,030); Nashville, TN
February 22, 2023; 6:00 p.m., SECN		at LSU	L 77–84	15–13 (8–7)	23 – Robbins	11 – Robbins	7 – Manjon	Pete Maravich Assembly Center (8,827); Baton Rouge, LA
February 25, 2023; 6:00 p.m., ESPN2		Florida	W 88–72	16–13 (9–7)	18 – Robbins	9 – Robbins	4 – Manjon	Memorial Gymnasium (10,133); Nashville, TN
March 1, 2023; 6:00 p.m., SECN		at No. 23 Kentucky	W 68–66	17–13 (10–7)	23 – Wright	7 – Lawrence	3 – Manjon	Rupp Arena (20,337); Lexington, KY
March 4, 2023; 7:30 p.m., SECN		Mississippi State	W 77–72	18–13 (11–7)	19 – Wright	6 – Wright	7 – Manjon	Memorial Gymnasium (10,544); Nashville, TN
SEC tournament
March 9, 2023; 8:00 p.m., SECN	(6)	vs. (14) LSU; Second round	W 77–68	19–13	22 – Lawrence	15 – Wright	3 – Manjon	Bridgestone Arena (14,583); Nashville, TN
March 10, 2023; 8:00 p.m., SECN	(6)	vs. (3) No. 23 Kentucky; Quarterfinals	W 80–73	20–13	25 – Manjon	6 – Wright	3 – Tied	Bridgestone Arena (17,989); Nashville, TN
March 11, 2023; 2:30 p.m., ESPN	(6)	vs. (2) No. 18 Texas A&M; Semifinals	L 75–87	20–14	18 – Lawrence	7 – Wright	7 – Manjon	Bridgestone Arena (17,528); Nashville, TN
NIT
March 14, 2023*; 8:00 p.m., ESPNU	(2)	Yale; First Round – Clemson Bracket	W 71–62	21–14	25 – Lawrence	13 – Millora-Brown	4 – Wright	Memorial Gymnasium (5,290); Nashville, TN
March 18, 2023*; 11:00 am, ESPN	(2)	(3) Michigan; Second Round – Clemson Bracket	W 66–65	22–14	24 – Lawrence	9 – Lawrence	4 – Wright	Memorial Gymnasium (8,337); Nashville, TN
March 22, 2023*; 6:00 pm, ESPN2	(2)	(4) UAB; Quarterfinals – Clemson Bracket	L 59–67	22–15	15 – Tied	9 – Tied	4 – Manjon	Memorial Gymnasium (10,258); Nashville, TN
*Non-conference game. ^{#}Rankings from AP Poll. (#) Tournament seedings in parentheses. All times are in Central Time.

== See also ==
- 2022–23 Vanderbilt Commodores women's basketball team
