= 2022–23 Georgia Bulldogs basketball team =

American college basketball season

2022–23 Georgia Bulldogs basketball
- Conference: Southeastern Conference
- Record: 16–16 (6–12 SEC)
- Head coach: Mike White (1st season)
- Associate head coach: Antonio Reynolds-Dean
- Assistant coaches: Erik Pastrana; Akeem Miskdeen
- Home arena: Stegeman Coliseum

2022–23 Southeastern Conference men's basketball standings
	Conf.				Overall
Team	W		L	PCT	W		L	PCT
No. 1 Alabama†	16	–	2	.889	31	–	6	.838
No. 17 Texas A&M	15	–	3	.833	25	–	10	.714
Kentucky	12	–	6	.667	22	–	12	.647
No. 23 Missouri	11	–	7	.611	25	–	10	.714
No. 20 Tennessee	11	–	7	.611	25	–	11	.694
Vanderbilt	11	–	7	.611	22	–	15	.595
Auburn	10	–	8	.556	21	–	13	.618
Florida	9	–	9	.500	16	–	17	.485
Mississippi State	8	–	10	.444	21	–	13	.618
Arkansas	8	–	10	.444	22	–	14	.611
Georgia	6	–	12	.333	16	–	16	.500
South Carolina	4	–	14	.222	11	–	21	.344
Ole Miss	3	–	15	.167	12	–	21	.364
LSU	2	–	16	.111	14	–	19	.424
† 2023 SEC tournament winner Rankings from AP poll

The 2022–23 Georgia Bulldogs basketball team represented the University of Georgia during the 2022–23 NCAA Division I men's basketball season. The team was led by first-year coach Mike White, and played their home games at Stegeman Coliseum in Athens, Georgia as a member of the Southeastern Conference. The Bulldogs finished their season 16–15, 6–12 in SEC play to finish in 11th place. As the No. 11 seed in the SEC tournament, they were defeated by LSU in the first round.

== Previous season ==
The Bulldogs finished the 2021-22 season 6–26, 1–17 in SEC Play to finish in fourteenth place. The 26 losses marked the worst season, record wise, in school history. They lost in the first round of the SEC tournament to Vanderbilt. As a result, head coach Tom Crean was fired.

== Offseason ==
=== Departures ===
Name	Number	Pos.	Height	Weight	Year	Hometown	Reason for departure
Cam McDowell	2	G	6'5"	185	Freshman	Powder Springs, GA	Transferred from Jacksonville State
Tyron McMillan	4	F	6'9"	220	Junior	New Orleans, LA	Transferred to McNeese State
Christian Wright	5	G	6'3"	185	Freshman	Alpharetta, GA	Transferred to Oregon State
Aaron Cook Jr.	10	G	6'2"	185	GS Senior	St. Louis, MO	Graduated
Josh Taylor	12	F	6'9"	215	Sophomore	Atlanta, GA	Transferred to East Tennessee State
Jonathan Ned	13	F	6'9"	220	Senior	Brentwood, CA	Graduate transferred to Western Washington
Dalen Ridgnal	15	F	6'7"	220	Junior	Kansas City, MO	Transferred to Missouri State
Noah Baumann	20	G	6'6"	210	RS Senior	Phoenix, AZ	Graduate transferred to Grand Canyon
P. J. Horne	24	F	6'6"	225	GS Senior	Tifton, GA	Graduate transferred
Tyrone Baker	35	C	6'11"	210	Freshman	Fort Myers, FL	Transferred to Dayton

=== Incoming transfers ===
Name	Number	Pos.	Height	Weight	Year	Hometown	Previous School
Terry Roberts	0	G	6'3"	180	Senior	North Amityville, NY	Bradley
Jusaun Holt	4	G	6'6"	190	Sophomore	Tacoma, WA	Alabama
Frank Anselem	5	C	6'10"	215	Junior	Lagos, Nigeria	Syracuse
Justin Hill	11	G	6'0"	185	Junior	Houston, TX	Longwood
Matthew-Alexander Moncrieffe	12	F	6'7"	215	Junior	Toronto, ON	Oklahoma State
Mardrez McBride	13	G	6'2"	180	GS Senior	Augusta, GA	North Texas

=== 2022 recruiting class ===
College recruiting information
Name	Hometown	School	Height	Weight	Commit date
KyeRon Lindsay #26 PF	Denton, TX	John H. Guyer High School	6 ft 7 in (2.01 m)	205 lb (93 kg)	Apr 30, 2022
KyeRon Lindsay #26 PF	Recruit ratings: Scout: Rivals: 247Sports: ESPN: (81)				
Overall recruit ranking:
Note: In many cases, Scout, Rivals, 247Sports, On3, and ESPN may conflict in their listings of height and weight.; In these cases, the average was taken. ESPN grades are on a 100-point scale.; Sources: "Georgia 2022 Basketball Commitments". Rivals.; "2022 Georgia Bulldogs Recruiting Class". ESPN.; "2022 Team Ranking". Rivals.

=== 2023 recruiting class ===
College recruiting information (2023)
Name	Hometown	School	Height	Weight	Commit date
Mari Jordan; SF	Dacula, GA	Dacula High School	6 ft 5 in (1.96 m)	180 lb (82 kg)	May 26, 2022
Mari Jordan; SF	Recruit ratings: Scout: Rivals: 247Sports: ESPN: (NR)				
Overall recruit ranking:
Note: In many cases, Scout, Rivals, 247Sports, On3, and ESPN may conflict in their listings of height and weight.; In these cases, the average was taken. ESPN grades are on a 100-point scale.; Sources: "Georgia 2023 Basketball Commitments". Rivals.; "2023 Georgia Bulldogs Recruiting Class". ESPN.; "2023 Team Ranking". Rivals.

== Roster ==
2022–23 Georgia Bulldogs men's basketball team
Players
Coaches

Pos.	#	Name	Height	Weight	Year	Previous school	Hometown
G	0	Terry Roberts	6 ft 3 in (1.91 m)	180 lb (82 kg)	Sr	Bradley	North Amityville, NY
G/F	1	Jabri Abdur-Rahim	6 ft 8 in (2.03 m)	210 lb (95 kg)	Jr	Virginia	South Orange, New Jersey
F	2	KyeRon Lindsay	6 ft 7 in (2.01 m)	205 lb (93 kg)	Fr	Dneton Guyer HS	Denton, Texas
G	3	Kario Oquendo	6 ft 4 in (1.93 m)	215 lb (98 kg)	Jr	Florida SouthWestern State College	Titusville, Florida
G	4	Jusaun Holt	6 ft 7 in (2.01 m)	190 lb (86 kg)	So	Alabama	Tacoma, Washington
C	5	Frank Anselem	6 ft 10 in (2.08 m)	215 lb (98 kg)	Jr	Syracuse	Lagos, Nigeria
G	10	Jaxon Etter (W)	6 ft 4 in (1.93 m)	205 lb (93 kg)	Sr	Etowah HS	Woodstock, Georgia
G	11	Justin Hill	6 ft 0 in (1.83 m)	185 lb (84 kg)	Jr	Longwood	Houston, Texas
F	12	Matthew-Alexander Moncrieffe	6 ft 8 in (2.03 m)	215 lb (98 kg)	Jr	Oklahoma State	Toronto, Ontario
G	13	Mardrez McBride	6 ft 2 in (1.88 m)	180 lb (82 kg)	RS Sr	North Texas	Augusta, Georgia
F	15	Jailyn Ingram	6 ft 7 in (2.01 m)	225 lb (102 kg)	GS	Florida Atlantic	Madison, Georgia
G	22	Brandon Klatsky (W)	6 ft 2 in (1.88 m)	160 lb (73 kg)	Fr	Ranney School	Colts Neck, New Jersey
F	23	Braelen Bridges	6 ft 11 in (2.11 m)	240 lb (109 kg)	GS	UIC	Atlanta, Georgia
F	24	Jaden Newell (W)	6 ft 8 in (2.03 m)	215 lb (98 kg)	Fr	Choctawhatchee HS	Fort Walton Beach, Florida

Head coach

- Mike White (Mississippi)

Assistant coach(es)

- Antonio Reynolds Dean (Rhode Island)
- Erik Pastrana (Florida State)
- Akeem Miskdeen (Queens (NC))

Legend

- (C) Team captain
- (S) Suspended
- (I) Ineligible
- (W) Walk-on
- Injured
- Current redshirt

Roster

== Schedule and results ==
Date time, TV	Rank^{#}	Opponent^{#}	Result	Record	High points	High rebounds	High assists	Site (attendance) city, state
Exhibition
October 31, 2022*; 6:00 p.m.		Georgia College	W 66–52		15 – Tied	9 – Moncrieffe	4 – Hill	Stegeman Coliseum; Athens, GA
Non-conference regular season
November 7, 2022*; 8:00 p.m., SECN+		Western Carolina	W 68–55	1–0	18 – Oquendo	5 – Tied	4 – Bridges	Stegeman Coliseum (7,757); Athens, GA
November 11, 2022*; 8:30 p.m., ACCN		at Wake Forest	L 71–81	1–1	13 – Tied	6 – Hill	5 – Roberts	LJVM Coliseum (7,114); Winston-Salem, NC
November 14, 2022*; 7:00 p.m., SECN+		Miami (OH)	W 77–70	2–1	22 – Roberts	10 – Lindsay	3 – Roberts	Stegeman Coliseum (6,147); Athens, GA
November 18, 2022*; 7:00 p.m., SECN		Bucknell; Sunshine Slam campus site game	W 65–61	3–1	20 – Roberts	9 – Roberts	6 – Roberts	Stegeman Coliseum (6,583); Athens, GA
November 21, 2022*; 8:30 p.m., CBSSN		vs. Saint Joseph's; Sunshine Slam Semifinals	W 66–53	4–1	16 – Oquendo	7 – Tied	5 – Roberts	Ocean Center (1,612); Daytona Beach, FL
November 22, 2022*; 4:00 p.m., CBSSN		vs. UAB; Sunshine Slam Championship	L 73–87	4–2	17 – Hill	7 – Tied	2 – Roberts	Ocean Center; Daytona Beach, FL
November 27, 2022*; 1:00 p.m., SECN		East Tennessee State	W 62–47	5–2	16 – Oquendo	6 – Roberts	6 – Roberts	Stegeman Coliseum (7,202); Athens, GA
November 30, 2022*; 7:00 p.m., SECN+		Hampton	W 73–54	6–2	21 – Bridges	13 – Bridges	6 – Hill	Stegeman Coliseum (5,911); Athens, GA
December 2, 2022*; 7:00 p.m., SECN+		Florida A&M	W 68–46	7–2	15 – McBride	9 – McBride	5 – Hill	Stegeman Coliseum (6,673); Athens, GA
December 6, 2022*; 7:00 p.m., ESPN2		at Georgia Tech	L 77–79	7–3	16 – Roberts	7 – Oquendo	7 – Roberts	McCamish Pavilion (5,810); Atlanta, GA
December 18, 2022*; 5:30 p.m., ESPN2		vs. Notre Dame; Holiday Hoopsgiving	W 77–62	8–3	18 – Bridges	11 – Abdur-Rahim	5 – Roberts	State Farm Arena (3,087); Atlanta, GA
December 21, 2022*; 3:00 p.m., SECN+		Chattanooga	W 72–65	9–3	22 – Oquendo	7 – Moncrieffe	6 – Roberts	Stegeman Coliseum (7,918); Athens, GA
December 28, 2022*; 7:00 p.m., SECN+		Rider	W 78–72	10–3	17 – Tied	6 – Tied	4 – Hill	Stegeman Coliseum (10,523); Athens, GA
SEC regular season
January 4, 2023; 6:30 p.m., SECN		No. 22 Auburn	W 76–64	11–3 (1–0)	26 – Roberts	9 – Moncrieffe	3 – Moncrieffe	Stegeman Coliseum (10,232); Athens, GA
January 7, 2023; 1:00 p.m., SECN		at Florida	L 75–82	11–4 (1–1)	25 – Roberts	8 – Roberts	4 – Roberts	O'Connell Center (9,077); Gainesville, FL
January 11, 2023; 6:30 p.m., SECN		Mississippi State	W 58–50	12–4 (2–1)	16 – Roberts	10 – Bridges	3 – Roberts	Stegeman Coliseum (7,741); Athens, GA
January 14, 2023; 1:00 p.m., SECN		at Ole Miss	W 62–58	13–4 (3–1)	15 – Oquendo	7 – Roberts	5 – Roberts	SJB Pavilion (6,117); Oxford, MS
January 17, 2023; 9:00 p.m., ESPN		at Kentucky	L 71–85	13–5 (3–2)	21 – Roberts	5 – Tied	3 – Roberts	Rupp Arena (19,171); Lexington, KY
January 21, 2023; 1:00 p.m., SECN		Vanderbilt	L 82–85	13–6 (3–3)	21 – Abdur-Rahim	8 – Bridges	6 – Roberts	Stegeman Coliseum (10,523); Athens, GA
January 25, 2023; 7:00 p.m., SECN		at No. 4 Tennessee	L 41–70	13–7 (3–4)	11 – Roberts	8 – Moncrieffe	3 – Hill	Thompson–Boling Arena (19,802); Knoxville, TN
January 28, 2023; 6:00 p.m., SECN		South Carolina	W 81–78 ^{OT}	14–7 (4–4)	17 – McBride	6 – Holt	9 – Roberts	Stegeman Coliseum (10,523); Athens, GA
February 1, 2023; 7:00 p.m., SECN		at No. 25 Auburn	L 73–94	14–8 (4–5)	20 – McBride	4 – Hill	4 – Hill	Neville Arena (9,121); Auburn, AL
February 4, 2023; 8:30 p.m., SECN		at Texas A&M	L 57–82	14–9 (4–6)	20 – Hill	6 – Moncrieffe	3 – Hill	Reed Arena (12,640); College Station, TX
February 7, 2023; 7:00 p.m., SECN		Ole Miss	L 74–78	14–10 (4–7)	26 – Bridges	11 – Bridges	7 – Hill	Stegeman Coliseum (7,135); Athens, GA
February 11, 2023; 12:00 p.m., ESPN		Kentucky	W 75–68	15–10 (5–7)	21 – Oquendo	9 – Moncrieffe	6 – Hill	Stegeman Coliseum (10,376); Athens, GA
February 14, 2023; 8:30 p.m., SECN		LSU	W 65–63	16–10 (6–7)	13 – Bridges	6 – Moncrieffe	4 – Roberts	Stegeman Coliseum (6,991); Athens, GA
February 18, 2023; 6:00 p.m., SECN		at No. 1 Alabama	L 59–108	16–11 (6–8)	17 – Hill	8 – Bridges	4 – Roberts	Coleman Coliseum (13,474); Tuscaloosa, AL
February 21, 2023; 9:00 p.m., SECN		at Arkansas	L 65–97	16–12 (6–9)	20 – Oquendo	8 – Bridges	2 – Roberts	Bud Walton Arena (19,200); Fayetteville, AR
February 25, 2023; 1:00 p.m., SECN		Missouri; Senior Day	L 63–85	16–13 (6–10)	14 – Oquendo	10 – Bridges	8 – Roberts	Stegeman Coliseum (10,041); Athens, GA
February 28, 2023; 7:00 p.m., SECN		Florida	L 67–77	16–14 (6–11)	20 – Oquendo	8 – Bridges	4 – Hill	Stegeman Coliseum (7,879); Athens, GA
March 4, 2023; 1:00 p.m., SECN		at South Carolina	L 55–61	16–15 (6–12)	14 – Roberts	5 – Roberts	1 – Tied	Colonial Life Arena (10,211); Columbia, SC
SEC tournament
March 8, 2023; 9:00 p.m., SECN	(11)	vs. (14) LSU; First round	L 67–72	16–16	13 – Tied	8 – Moncrieffe	4 – Hill	Bridgestone Arena (14,326); Nashville, TN
*Non-conference game. ^{#}Rankings from AP Poll. (#) Tournament seedings in parentheses. All times are in Eastern Time.

== See also ==
- 2022–23 Georgia Lady Bulldogs basketball team
