= Terry Roberts (basketball) =

American basketball player (born 2000)

Ostioneros de Guaymas
- Position: Point guard
- League: CIBACOPA

Personal information
- Born: September 7, 2000 (age 26) North Amityville, New York, U.S.
- Listed height: 6 ft 3 in (1.91 m)
- Listed weight: 180 lb (82 kg)

Career information
- High school: Believe Prep (Rock Hill, South Carolina)
- College: Florida SouthWestern (2019–2021); Bradley (2021–2022); Georgia (2022–2023)
- NBA draft: 2023: undrafted
- Playing career: 2023–present

Career history
- 2023–2026: Long Island Nets
- 2025: Winnipeg Sea Bears
- 2026–present: Ostioneros de Guaymas

Career highlights
- First-team All-MVC (2022); MVC Newcomer of the Year (2022); First-team All-Southern (2021)
- Stats at Basketball Reference

Terry Roberts (born September 7, 2000) is an American professional basketball player for the Long Island Nets of the NBA G League. He played college basketball for Florida SouthWestern State, Bradley, and Georgia.

== Early life and high school ==
Terry Roberts was born on September 7, 2000. Growing up, Roberts' hometown was North Amityville, New York. Roberts played high school basketball at Believe Prep in Rock Hill, South Carolina, where he averaged 18 points, 7 assists, and 5 rebounds.

== College career ==
=== Florida SouthWestern State ===
Roberts first attended Florida SouthWestern State to play basketball. Roberts helped Florida SouthWestern obtain a 29–2 record and the Round of 16 in the NJCAA tournament before the season was canceled due to the COVID-19 pandemic. Roberts averaged 6.1 points, 2.8 rebounds, and 2.9 assists as Florida SouthWestern was ranked number one in the nation following the conclusion of the season.

During his sophomore year, Roberts played with future teammate at Georgia, Kario Oquendo. In his second year at Florida SouthWestern, the team finished with a lower 18–6 record. However, Roberts' statistics improved, with him averaging 15.0 points and 5.7 assists while also being named first-team All-Southern Conference.

=== Bradley ===
Before the beginning of the 2021–22 season, Roberts transferred to Bradley. In his debut game for Bradley, Roberts scored 15 points with 4 rebounds and 5 assists in a loss against South Dakota State. On December 22, Roberts scored the most points he would while at Bradley with 26 and recorded his first double-double with an additional 11 rebounds in a win against UTEP. Overall, Roberts started all 31 games for Bradley and averaged 14.5 points, 4.9 rebounds, and 4.1 assists. Additionally, Roberts was named Missouri Valley Conference newcomer of the year and first-team All-MVC.

=== Georgia ===
Following his lone year at Bradley, Roberts transferred to play for Georgia his senior year. In his debut game for Georgia, Roberts scored 8 points with 3 rebounds and 1 assist in a win over Western Carolina. On January 4, Roberts scored a career-high while at Georgia with 26 points in a win against No. 22 Auburn. The next game, Roberts followed it up with 25 points in a loss against Florida. Overall, Roberts started 26 out of 29 games and averaged 13.7 points, 3.8 rebounds, and 4.0 assists. Roberts' average for points and assists was the highest on the Georgia team that season.

Following his senior year, Roberts declined to use the extra year of eligibility offered by the NCAA for the shortened seasons caused by the COVID-19 pandemic and declared for the 2023 NBA draft.

== Professional career ==
=== Long Island Nets (2023–2026) ===
After going undrafted in the 2023 NBA draft, Roberts joined the Long Island Nets on October 28, 2023 following a tryout.

On September 3, 2024, Roberts signed with APOEL of the Cypriot League, but never played for them, re-joining Long Island on December 30.

== Personal life ==
Roberts is the son of Terrence and Allison Roberts.

On February 25, 2024, Roberts was shot outside a bar in Philadelphia, Pennsylvania. He suffered a chest wound and was initially put on a ventilator but later made a full recovery.

== Career statistics ==
Legend
| GP | Games played | GS | Games started | MPG | Minutes per game |
| FG% | Field goal percentage | 3P% | 3-point field goal percentage | FT% | Free throw percentage |
| RPG | Rebounds per game | APG | Assists per game | SPG | Steals per game |
| BPG | Blocks per game | PPG | Points per game | **Bold** | Career high |

=== College ===
| Year | Team | GP | GS | MPG | FG% | 3P% | FT% | RPG | APG | SPG | BPG | PPG |
|---|---|---|---|---|---|---|---|---|---|---|---|---|
| 2019–20 | Florida SouthWestern | 29 | 3 | 19.5 | .391 | .303 | **.857** | 2.8 | 2.9 | **2.1** | .5 | 6.1 |
| 2020–21 | Florida SouthWestern | 23 | 19 | 29.3 | .430 | .315 | .826 | 4.8 | **5.7** | 2.7 | **.8** | **15.0** |
| 2021–22 | Bradley | **31** | **31** | 28.7 | **.453** | **.342** | .700 | **4.9** | 4.1 | 1.6 | .6 | 14.5 |
| 2022–23 | Georgia | 29 | 28 | **30.0** | .394 | .299 | .756 | 3.8 | 4.0 | 1.5 | .2 | 13.2 |
| Career | | 118 | 81 | 26.6 | .418 | .316 | .782 | 4.1 | 4.4 | 2.0 | .5 | 12.0 |
