= 2022–23 Ole Miss Rebels men's basketball team =

American college basketball season

2022–23 Ole Miss Rebels men's basketball
- Conference: Southeastern Conference
- Record: 12–21 (3–15 SEC)
- Head coach: Kermit Davis (5th season; fired on February 24, 2023); Win Case (interim; final 5 games)
- Assistant coaches: Win Case; Robert Kirby; Brock Morris
- Home arena: SJB Pavilion

2022–23 Southeastern Conference men's basketball standings
	Conf.				Overall
Team	W		L	PCT	W		L	PCT
No. 1 Alabama†	16	–	2	.889	31	–	6	.838
No. 17 Texas A&M	15	–	3	.833	25	–	10	.714
Kentucky	12	–	6	.667	22	–	12	.647
No. 23 Missouri	11	–	7	.611	25	–	10	.714
No. 20 Tennessee	11	–	7	.611	25	–	11	.694
Vanderbilt	11	–	7	.611	22	–	15	.595
Auburn	10	–	8	.556	21	–	13	.618
Florida	9	–	9	.500	16	–	17	.485
Mississippi State	8	–	10	.444	21	–	13	.618
Arkansas	8	–	10	.444	22	–	14	.611
Georgia	6	–	12	.333	16	–	16	.500
South Carolina	4	–	14	.222	11	–	21	.344
Ole Miss	3	–	15	.167	12	–	21	.364
LSU	2	–	16	.111	14	–	19	.424
† 2023 SEC tournament winner Rankings from AP poll

The 2022–23 Ole Miss Rebels men's basketball team represented the University of Mississippi during the 2022–23 NCAA Division I men's basketball season. The Rebels were led by fifth-year head coach, Kermit Davis, until his dismissal on February 24. The Rebels played their home games at The Sandy and John Black Pavilion at Ole Miss in Oxford, Mississippi as members of the Southeastern Conference. They finished the season 12–21, 3–15 in SEC play to finish in 13th place. They defeated South Carolina in the first round in the SEC Tournament before losing in the second round to Tennessee.

Head coach Kermit Davis was fired on February 24, 2023, with the remaining three games of the regular season and conference tournament being led by assistant coach Win Case. On March 13, the school named recently-fired Texas head coach Chris Beard the team's new head coach.

== Previous season ==
The Rebels finished the 2021–22 season 13–19, 4–14 in SEC play to finish in 13th place. They lost in the first round of the SEC tournament to Missouri.

== Offseason ==
=== Departures ===
Ole Miss Departures
Name	Number	Pos.	Height	Weight	Year	Hometown	Notes	Ref.
Eric Van Der Heijden	0	F	6'8"	205	Freshman	Raleigh, NC	Transferred to UNC Wilmington	
Austin Crowley	1	G	6'5"	195	Junior	West Point, MS	Transferred to Southern Miss	
Nysier Brooks	1	C	7'0"	245	Graduate Student	Philadelphia, PA	Graduated	
Grant Slatten	10	G	6'5"	195	Freshman	Sparta, TN	Transferred to Tennessee Tech	
Luis Rodriguez	15	G/F	6'6"	210	RS Junior	Los Angeles, CA	Transferred to UNLV	
Sammy Hunter	23	F	6'9"	225	Junior	Nassau, Bahamas	Transferred to Akron	
Jarkel Joiner	24	G	6'1"	180	RS Senior	Oxford, MS	Transferred to NC State	

=== 2022 recruiting class ===
College recruiting
Name	Hometown	School	Height	Weight	Commit date
Malique Ewin #13 C	Lawrenceville, GA	Berkmar High School	6 ft 10 in (2.08 m)	220 lb (100 kg)	Oct 12, 2021
Malique Ewin #13 C	Recruit ratings: Rivals: 247Sports: ESPN: (82)				
Amaree Abram #18 PG	Port Arthur, TX	Southern California Academy	6 ft 3 in (1.91 m)	180 lb (82 kg)	Mar 5, 2022
Amaree Abram #18 PG	Recruit ratings: Rivals: 247Sports: ESPN: (82)				
TJ Caldwell; SG	Dallas, TX	Faith Family Academy	6 ft 4 in (1.93 m)	170 lb (77 kg)	Oct 1, 2021
TJ Caldwell; SG	Recruit ratings: Rivals: 247Sports: ESPN: (82)				
Robert Cowherd; SG	Grayson, GA	Southern California Academy	6 ft 4 in (1.93 m)	200 lb (91 kg)	Sep 30, 2021
Robert Cowherd; SG	Recruit ratings: Rivals: 247Sports: ESPN: (80)				
Overall recruit ranking: 247Sports: 25 ESPN: 12
Note: In many cases, Scout, Rivals, 247Sports, On3, and ESPN may conflict in their listings of height and weight.; In these cases, the average was taken. ESPN grades are on a 100-point scale.; Sources: "Ole Miss 2022 Basketball Commitments". Rivals.; "2022 Team Ranking". Rivals.

=== Incoming transfers ===
Incoming transfers
Name	Number	Pos.	Height	Weight	Year	Hometown	Previous School	Ref.
Jayveous McKinnis	00	F	6'7"	225	Senior	Brandon, MS	Jackson State	
Myles Burns	3	F	6'6"	210	Senior	Houston, TX	Loyola New Orleans	
Theo Akwuba	10	F	6'11"	225	Senior	Montgomery, AL	Louisiana	
Josh Mballa	33	F	6'7"	220	Senior	Bordeaux, France	Buffalo	

== Roster ==
2022–23 Ole Miss Rebels men's basketball team
Players
Coaches

Pos.	#	Name	Height	Weight	Year	Previous school	Hometown
F	00	Jayveous McKinnis	6 ft 7 in (2.01 m)	225 lb (102 kg)	Sr	Brandon HS; Jackson State	Brandon, MS
G	1	Amaree Abram	6 ft 4 in (1.93 m)	192 lb (87 kg)	Fr	Southern California Academy	Port Arthur, TX
G	2	TJ Caldwell	6 ft 4 in (1.93 m)	190 lb (86 kg)	Fr	Faith Family Academy	Dallas, TX
F	3	Myles Burns	6 ft 6 in (1.98 m)	210 lb (95 kg)	Sr	Lamar HS; Loyola New Orleans	Houston, TX
F	4	Jaemyn Brakefield	6 ft 8 in (2.03 m)	220 lb (100 kg)	Jr	Huntington Prep School; Duke	Jackson, MS
G	5	James White	6 ft 5 in (1.96 m)	190 lb (86 kg)	So	Heritage HS	Conyers, GA
F	10	Theo Akwuba	6 ft 11 in (2.11 m)	225 lb (102 kg)	Sr	Brewbaker Technology Magnet HS; Louisiana	Montgomery, AL
G	11	Matthew Murrell	6 ft 4 in (1.93 m)	200 lb (91 kg)	Jr	IMG Academy	Memphis, TN
F	12	Malique Ewin	6 ft 10 in (2.08 m)	220 lb (100 kg)	Fr	Berkmar HS	Lawrenceville, GA
G	13	Robert Cowherd	6 ft 5 in (1.96 m)	195 lb (88 kg)	Fr	Southern California Academy	Grayson, GA
G	14	Tye Fagan	6 ft 3 in (1.91 m)	198 lb (90 kg)	Sr	Upson-Lee HS; Georgia	Logtown, GA
F	21	Robert Allen	6 ft 8 in (2.03 m)	230 lb (104 kg)	Sr	Edgewater HS; Samford	Orlando, FL
G	24	Daeshun Ruffin	5 ft 9 in (1.75 m)	160 lb (73 kg)	So	Callaway HS	Jackson, MS
F	33	Josh Mballa	6 ft 7 in (2.01 m)	220 lb (100 kg)	Sr	Putnam Science Academy; Buffalo	Bordeaux, France
G	55	Cam Brent (W)	5 ft 4 in (1.63 m)	130 lb (59 kg)	Fr	Jackson Prep	Jackson, MS (United States) (Mississippi)

Head coach

- Kermit Davis (Mississippi State)

Assistant coach(es)

- Win Case (University of Science and Arts of Oklahoma)
- Robert Kirby (Texas–Pan American)
- Brock Morris (Alabama)

Legend

- (C) Team captain
- (S) Suspended
- (I) Ineligible
- (W) Walk-on
- Injured
- Current redshirt

Roster

== Schedule and results ==
Date time, TV	Rank^{#}	Opponent^{#}	Result	Record	High points	High rebounds	High assists	Site (attendance) city, state
Exhibition
November 1, 2022*; 6:30 p.m.		West Georgia	W 91–62		16 – Brakefield	8 – Brakefield	6 – Abram	SJB Pavilion; Oxford, MS
Non-conference regular season
November 7, 2022*; 8:00 p.m., SECN+/ESPN+		Alcorn State	W 73–58	1–0	20 – Murrell	9 – Akwuba	3 – Murrell	SJB Pavilion (5,990); Oxford, MS
November 11, 2022*; 6:00 p.m., SECN+/ESPN+		Florida Atlantic	W 80–67	2–0	17 – Brakefield	8 – Brakefield	7 – Murrell	SJB Pavilion (5,974); Oxford, MS
November 15, 2022*; 6:30 p.m., SECN+/ESPN+		Chattanooga	W 70–58	3–0	25 – Murrell	5 – Tied	3 – Tied	SJB Pavilion (5,479); Oxford, MS
November 18, 2022*; 6:30 p.m., SECN+/ESPN+		UT Martin	W 72–68	4–0	16 – Murrell	8 – Burns	4 – Caldwell	SJB Pavilion (5,024); Oxford, MS
November 24, 2022*; 12:30 p.m., ESPNU		vs. Stanford; ESPN Events Invitational quarterfinals	W 72–68	5–0	26 – Abram	8 – Brakefield	4 – Tied	State Farm Field House (1,211); Bay Lake, FL
November 25, 2022*; 10:00 a.m., ESPN2		vs. Siena; ESPN Events Invitational semifinals	W 74–62	6–0	19 – Abram	7 – Tied	3 – Tied	State Farm Field House; Bay Lake, FL
November 27, 2022*; 12:30 p.m., ESPN		vs. Oklahoma; ESPN Events Invitational championship	L 55–59	6–1	17 – Abram	10 – Brakefield	5 – Abram	State Farm Field House (1,014); Bay Lake, FL
December 3, 2022*; 6:30 p.m., ESPN2		at Memphis	L 57–68	6–2	13 – Murrell	6 – Tied	4 – Ruffin	FedExForum (13,264); Memphis, TN
December 10, 2022*; 2:00 p.m., SECN		Valparaiso	W 98–61	7–2	17 – Murrell	8 – Burns	4 – Abram	SJB Pavilion (5,517); Oxford, MS
December 14, 2022*; 6:30 p.m., SECN+/ESPN+		UCF	L 61–72	7–3	21 – Murrell	7 – Mballa	6 – Ruffin	SJB Pavilion (5,215); Oxford, MS
December 17, 2022*; 4:00 p.m., SECN		Temple	W 63–55	8–3	21 – Murrell	12 – Burns	4 – Ruffin	SJB Pavilion (6,154); Oxford, MS
December 20, 2022*; 2:00 p.m., SECN+/ESPN+		North Alabama	L 65–66	8–4	16 – Murrell	13 – Burns	3 – Ruffin	SJB Pavilion (5,477); Oxford, MS
SEC regular season
December 28, 2022; 4:00 p.m., SECN		No. 7 Tennessee	L 59–63	8–5 (0–1)	18 – Brakefield	6 – Burns	3 – Murrell	SJB Pavilion (7,013); Oxford, MS
January 3, 2023; 8:00 p.m., SECN		at No. 7 Alabama	L 62–84	8–6 (0–2)	14 – Brakefield	9 – Brakefield	3 – Ruffin	Coleman Coliseum (8,505); Tuscaloosa, AL
January 7, 2023; 1:00 p.m., CBS		at Mississippi State	L 54–64	8–7 (0–3)	19 – Murrell	10 – Burns	3 – Ruffin	Humphrey Coliseum (9,295); Starkville, MS
January 10, 2023; 8:00 p.m., ESPNU		No. 21 Auburn	L 73–82	8–8 (0–4)	24 – Murrell	6 – Murrell	4 – Murrell	SJB Pavilion (5,973); Oxford, MS
January 14, 2023; 12:00 p.m., SECN		Georgia	L 58–62	8–9 (0–5)	13 – Murrell	6 – Brakefield	5 – Abram	SJB Pavilion (6,117); Oxford, MS
January 17, 2023; 5:30 p.m., SECN		at South Carolina	W 70–58	9–9 (1–5)	23 – Murrell	10 – McKinnis	4 – Brakefield	Colonial Life Arena (9,171); Columbia, SC
January 21, 2023; 11:00 a.m., ESPN2		at No. 25 Arkansas	L 57–69	9–10 (1–6)	10 – Tied	7 – Burns	3 – Tied	Bud Walton Arena (19,200); Fayetteville, AR
January 24, 2023; 6:00 p.m., SECN		Missouri	L 77–89	9–11 (1–7)	18 – Ruffin	6 – Tied	7 – Ruffin	SJB Pavilion (6,260); Oxford, MS
January 28, 2023*; 7:00 p.m., ESPN2		at Oklahoma State; Big 12/SEC Challenge	L 60–82	9–12	12 – Tied	6 – McKinnis	2 – Abram	Gallagher-Iba Arena (9,973); Stillwater, OK
January 31, 2023; 8:00 p.m., ESPN		Kentucky	L 66–75	9–13 (1–8)	17 – Abram	8 – Burns	4 – Tied	SJB Pavilion (7,945); Oxford, MS
February 4, 2023; 12:00 p.m., SECN		at Vanderbilt	L 71–74	9–14 (1–9)	15 – Brakefield	12 – Brakefield	3 – Murrell	Memorial Gymnasium (7,237); Nashville, TN
February 7, 2023; 6:00 p.m., SECN		at Georgia	W 78–74	10–14 (2–9)	28 – Brakefield	7 – Tied	5 – Tied	Stegeman Coliseum (7,135); Athens, GA
February 11, 2023; 12:00 p.m., SECN		South Carolina	L 61–64	10–15 (2–10)	17 – Fagan	7 – Allen	4 – Abram	SJB Pavilion (5,928); Oxford, MS
February 15, 2023; 5:30 p.m., SECN		at Florida	L 64–79	10–16 (2–11)	15 – Murrell	8 – Brakefield	1 – Tied	O'Connell Center (7,464); Gainesville, FL
February 18, 2023; 2:30 p.m., SECN		Mississippi State	L 61–69 ^{OT}	10–17 (2–12)	20 – Brakefield	8 – Brakefield	6 – Murrell	SJB Pavilion (7,188); Oxford, MS
February 22, 2023; 8:00 p.m., SECN		at Auburn	L 74–78	10–18 (2–13)	23 – Murrell	6 – Tied	3 – Allen	Neville Arena (9,121); Auburn, AL
February 25, 2023; 7:30 p.m., SECN		LSU	W 82–69	11–18 (3–13)	23 – Brakefield	10 – Brakefield	4 – Murrell	SJB Pavilion (6,304); Oxford, MS
February 28, 2023; 8:00 p.m., ESPNU		No. 24 Texas A&M	L 61–69	11–19 (3–14)	26 – Murrell	5 – Tied	4 – Tied	SJB Pavilion (6,008); Oxford, MS
March 4, 2023; 2:30 p.m., SECN		at Missouri	L 77–82	11–20 (3–15)	18 – Brakefield	11 – Burns	4 – Tied	Mizzou Arena (15,061); Columbia, MO
SEC tournament
March 8, 2023; 6:00 p.m., SECN	(13)	vs. (12) South Carolina; First round	W 67–61	12–20	20 – Abram	10 – White	4 – Burns	Bridgestone Arena (14,326); Nashville, TN
March 9, 2023; 2:00 p.m., SECN	(13)	vs. (5) No. 17 Tennessee; Second round	L 55–70	12–21	14 – Burns	5 – Tied	4 – Murrell	Bridgestone Arena (13,165); Nashville, TN
*Non-conference game. ^{#}Rankings from AP Poll. (#) Tournament seedings in parentheses. All times are in Central Time.

== See also ==
- 2022–23 Ole Miss Rebels women's basketball team
