= Dr. Phillips High School =

American public high school

Location
- 6500 Turkey Lake Road; Orlando, Florida 32819; United States; 28°28′12″N 81°28′39″W

Information
- Type: Public
- Motto: "Never less than the best!"
- Established: 1987
- School district: Orange County Public Schools
- Principal: Jackie Ramsey
- Teaching staff: 133.00 (on an FTE basis)
- Enrollment: 2,629 (2026–2027)
- Student to teacher ratio: 22.87
- Hours in school day: 7 hours
- Colors: Navy Blue; Carolina Blue
- Mascot: Florida panther
- Team name: Panthers
- Newspaper: The Panther Post
- Yearbook: Panther
- Website: drphillipshs.ocps.net

Dr. Phillips High School is a public high school in Dr. Phillips, Florida, United States, near Orlando. It serves the Dr. Phillips census-designated place (CDP), the Bay Hill CDP, and the residential portion of Lake Buena Vista.

== History ==
Dr. Phillips High School opened in fall of 1987 and was built for about 2,500 students in the Dr. Phillips area of southwest Orange County, Florida.

The campus sits on 55 acres (220,000 m^{2}) in the Orlando city limits and unincorporated Orange County, opposite Universal Orlando. The school serves as a Visual and Performing Arts Magnet and Center for International Studies magnet for Orange County Public Schools.

The school's first principal, Bill Spoone, went on to be elected to the Orange County School Board. The football stadium is named after him. The school's gymnasium is named after its second principal, Larry Payne, and is nicknamed "The House of Payne."

The school opened with enrollment above capacity and began using portable classrooms on the North Campus, formerly known as the 9th Grade Center. Due to overflow from main campus, many non-freshman classes were moved into additional portable classrooms at the 9th Grade Center, which was renamed North Campus, with the main campus renamed the South Campus. North Campus is now only used for various electives that encompass all grades.

Since the 2022-2023 school year, most of the portables have been shut down, due to the aging conditions and the possibility of a future renovation. In October 2024, construction workers began to destroy or transport the portables, and most of the area is now rubble and construction sand. As of December 2024, only around eight portables currently remain, awaiting to be destroyed or transported. Portable classrooms are no longer in daily use on the North Campus (as of the 2026-27 school year), with only 2 sections of the portables remaining on the campus. North Campus only has around 10 classrooms being used daily, all in its large permanent buildings (18, 19, 22.) Otherwise, North Campus is used as the testing center with tests regularly administered in the buildings and portables.

As of the 2014–15 school year the school had 3,641 students, of whom 35% were white, 32% African American, 24% Hispanic, 7% Asian, and 2% multiracial.

The school underwent a series of renovations which finished in 2015. A new building has been added, along with new VPA classrooms on the South Campus.

== Athletics ==
The mascot for Dr. Phillips is the Panther; specifically, the Florida panther. They have many sports including lacrosse, football, baseball, golf, basketball and swimming. The Panthers have won FHSAA state championships in the following sports:

- Football (2017)
- Baseball (1996)
- Men's Basketball (2021)
- Women's Basketball (1992, 2011, 2012, 2013, 2022, 2023, 2024)
- Men's Golf (1990, 1991, 1997, 1999)
- Women's Golf (1993, 1994)
- Men's Swimming & Diving (1995)
- Women's Swimming & Diving (1994, 1995, 1996, 1997, 1998)
- Competitive Cheerleading (2009, 2010, 2011, 2012, 2013, 2020)
- Women's Flag Football (2011)

Athletic program accomplishments:

- FHSAA State All-Sports Award - 2012-13
- FHSAA State All-Sports Award - 2010-11
- FHSAA State All-Sports Award - 1998-99
- FHSAA State All-Sports Award - 1995-96

== Notable alumni ==
Listed chronologically:

- Dan Miceli (1988), MLB pitcher
- Wayne Brady (1989), actor
- Robert Damron (1990), professional golfer
- Brian Barber (1991), MLB player
- Johnny Damon (1992), MLB outfielder, Dancing with the Stars contestant
- Rene Plasencia (1992), Member of the Florida House of Representatives, R-50
- Braniff Bonaventure (1993), Arena Football League player
- DJ Khaled (1993), producer, DJ
- Sean O'Neal (1993), actor on Clarissa Explains It All
- JC Chasez (1994), singer, songwriter, dancer, actor, producer, and member of *NSYNC
- A. J. Pierzynski (1994), MLB catcher
- Ike Charlton (1995), CFL player
- Joey Fatone (1995), actor, television host, singer, dancer, and member of *NSYNC
- Luis Fonsi (1995), singer, Grammy award winner
- Bobby Olszewski (1995), former member of the Florida House of Representatives, R-44
- Mark Ruiz (1997), member of US Olympic diving team at 2000 and 2004 Summer Olympics
- Doug Gabriel (1998), NFL player
- Jean Rodríguez (1998), Latin singer, songwriter, producer, and the brother of Luis Fonsi
- Mekia Cox (1999), actress
- Ashley Eckstein (1999), actress
- Kenny Layne (1999), professional wrestler
- Amanda Seales (1999), actress
- Michael James Scott (1999), broadway actor
- Damien Wilkins (1999), NBA basketball player
- Eddie Huang (2000), writer, director, restaurateur
- Matt Lauria (2000), actor
- Buddy Brown (2001), country music singer
- Brit Marling (2001), actress
- Valery Ortiz (2002), actress
- Ty Tryon (2002), professional golfer
- Oliver Marmol (2004), MLB baseball manager
- Wesley Taylor (2004), Broadway actor
- Scooter Magruder (2007), YouTube personality
- Chris Warren (2007), basketball player
- Ray Willis (2008), basketball player
- Darren Barnet (2009), actor
- Kona Reeves (2009), professional wrestler
- Kenny Shaw (2010), professional football player
- Ha Ha Clinton-Dix (2011), NFL free safety
- Dee Hart (2011), USA Today High School All-American (2010)
- Shane Larkin (2011), NBA player
- Marcell Harris (2012), NFL safety
- Trey Griffey (2012), NFL wide receiver
- Madison Anderson (2013), model, Miss Universe 2019 runner up
- Matt Milano (2013), NFL linebacker
- Hotboii (2018 - did not graduate), rapper
- Stephen Dix Jr. (2020), NFL linebacker
- Denzel Aberdeen (2022), basketball player
- Riley Kugel (2022), basketball player
- Ernest Udeh Jr. (2022), basketball player

== See also ==
- Olympia High School (Orlando, Florida)
