= Riley Kugel =

American basketball player (born 2003)

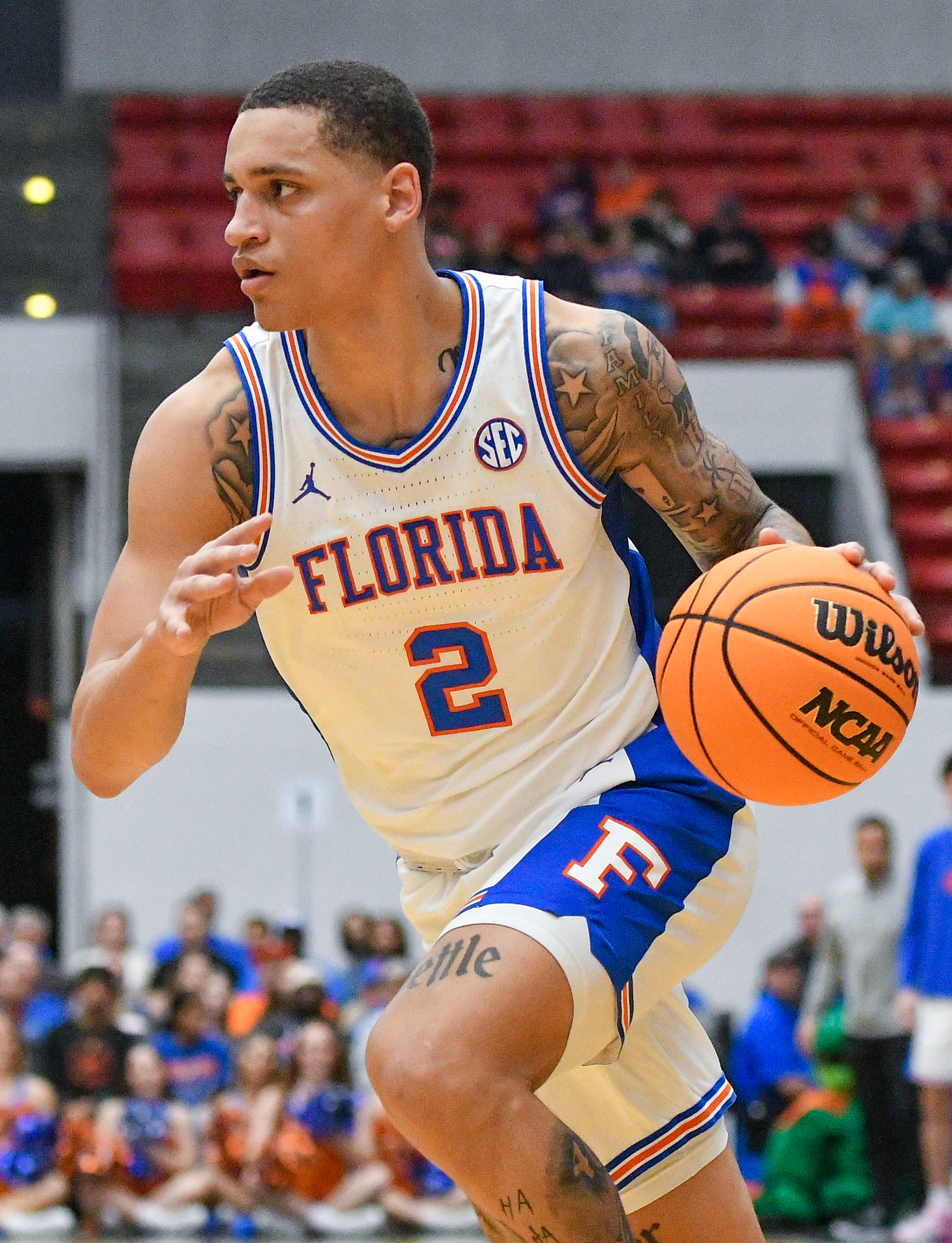
- Kugel with Florida in 2023

Free agent
- Position: Point guard / shooting guard

Personal information
- Born: November 30, 2003 (age 22)
- Listed height: 6 ft 5 in (1.96 m)
- Listed weight: 210 lb (95 kg)

Career information
- High school: Central Florida Christian Academy (Orlando, Florida); Dr. Phillips (Orlando, Florida)
- College: Florida (2022–2024); Mississippi State (2024–2025); UCF (2025–2026)
- NBA draft: 2026: undrafted

Career highlights
- SEC All-Freshman team (2023)

Riley Estelle Kugel (born November 30, 2003) is an American basketball player. He played college basketball for the Florida Gators, Mississippi State Bulldogs and UCF Knights.

== Early life and high school career ==
Kugel grew up in Orlando, Florida and initially attended Central Florida Christian Academy. He transferred to Dr. Phillips High School after his sophomore year. Kugel averaged 16.5 points, 4.8 rebounds, and 3.2 assists per game as a senior.

=== Recruiting ===
Kugel was rated as a four-star recruit. He initially committed and signed a National Letter of Intent (NLI) to play for Mississippi State. Kugel was later released from his NLI upon his request after Mississippi State fired head coach Ben Howland. He ultimately committed to play for Florida.

College recruiting
Name	Hometown	School	Height	Weight	Commit date
Riley Kugel; PG / SG	Orlando, FL	Dr. Phillips (FL)	6 ft 5 in (1.96 m)	185 lb (84 kg)	May 23, 2022
Riley Kugel; PG / SG	Recruit ratings: Rivals: 247Sports: ESPN: (84)				
Overall recruit ranking: Rivals: 145 247Sports: 56 ESPN: 67
Note: In many cases, Scout, Rivals, 247Sports, On3, and ESPN may conflict in their listings of height and weight.; In these cases, the average was taken. ESPN grades are on a 100-point scale.; Sources: "Florida 2022 Basketball Commitments". Rivals.; "2022 Florida Gators Recruiting Class". ESPN.; "2022 Team Ranking". Rivals.

== College career ==
=== Florida ===
Kugel became a starter for the Florida Gators midway through his freshman season. He finished the season averaging 9.9 points and 2.8 rebounds per game and was named the Southeastern Conference (SEC) All-Freshman team. During conference play, he averaged 12.6 points, the most by a Florida freshman since Bradley Beal's 14.4 per game in the 2011–12 season. He considered entering the 2023 NBA draft, but ultimately decided to Florida for his sophomore season. Before the start of the 2023–2024 season, he was named to coaches preseason All-SEC first team. Kugel announced his intention to transfer out of Florida in March 2024.

=== Kansas ===
Kugel announced his commitment to Kansas on March 31, 2024. He announced on May 8, 2024 that he would not play for Kansas after all.

== Career statistics ==
Legend
GP	Games played	GS	Games started	MPG	Minutes per game
FG%	Field goal percentage	3P%	3-point field goal percentage	FT%	Free throw percentage
RPG	Rebounds per game	APG	Assists per game	SPG	Steals per game
BPG	Blocks per game	PPG	Points per game	**Bold**	Career high

=== College ===
Year	Team	GP	GS	MPG	FG%	3P%	FT%	RPG	APG	SPG	BPG	PPG
2022–23	Florida	32	**17**	23.0	**.456**	**.376**	.663	2.8	1.0	.8	**.2**	**9.9**
2023–24	Florida	**33**	11	**23.3**	.394	.312	**.696**	**3.5**	**1.5**	**1.1**	**.2**	9.2
Career		65	28	23.1	.423	.342	.678	3.2	1.2	1.0	.2	9.5
