= 2023–24 Auburn Tigers men's basketball team =

American college basketball season

2023–24 Auburn Tigers men's basketball

Legends Classic champions SEC tournament champions

NCAA tournament, First Round
- Conference: Southeastern Conference

Ranking
- Coaches: No. 17
- AP: No. 18
- Record: 27–8 (13–5 SEC)
- Head coach: Bruce Pearl (10th season)
- Assistant coaches: Ira Bowman (6th season); Steven Pearl (7th season); Corey Williams (1st season)
- Home arena: Neville Arena

2023–24 Southeastern Conference men's basketball standings
	Conf.				Overall
Team	W		L	PCT	W		L	PCT
No. 5 Tennessee	14	–	4	.778	27	–	9	.750
No. 20 Kentucky	13	–	5	.722	23	–	10	.697
No. 3т Alabama	13	–	5	.722	25	–	12	.676
No. 18 Auburn †	13	–	5	.722	27	–	8	.771
No. 25 South Carolina	13	–	5	.722	26	–	8	.765
Florida	11	–	7	.611	24	–	12	.667
Texas A&M	9	–	9	.500	21	–	15	.583
LSU	9	–	9	.500	17	–	16	.515
Mississippi State	8	–	10	.444	21	–	14	.600
Ole Miss	7	–	11	.389	20	–	12	.625
Georgia	6	–	12	.333	20	–	17	.541
Arkansas	6	–	12	.333	16	–	17	.485
Vanderbilt	4	–	14	.222	9	–	23	.281
Missouri	0	–	18	.000	8	–	24	.250
† 2024 SEC tournament winner Rankings from AP poll

The 2023–24 Auburn Tigers men's basketball team represented Auburn University during the 2023–24 NCAA Division I men's basketball season as a member of the Southeastern Conference. The team's head coach was Bruce Pearl in his 10th season at Auburn. The team played its home games at Neville Arena in Auburn, Alabama.

== Previous season ==
The 2022–23 Auburn Tigers men's basketball team finished the 2022–23 season with a record of 21–13, 10–8 in Southeastern Conference play to finish in seventh place in the conference. As the No. 7 seed, they were defeated by No. 10 seed Arkansas in the second round of the SEC tournament. The Tigers received an at-large bid to the NCAA tournament as the No. 9 seed in the Midwest Region, where they defeated Iowa in the First Round before falling to the region's top seed Houston in the Second Round. After the season, Corey Williams replaced Wes Flanigan on the team's staff.

== Offseason ==
=== Departures ===
Name	Number	Pos.	Height	Weight	Year	Hometown	Reason for departure
Wendell Green Jr.	1	G	5'11"	175	Junior	Detroit, MI	Undrafted in 2023 NBA draft; signed with the Cleveland Cavaliers.
Chance Westry	10	G	6'6"	190	Freshman	Harrisburg, PA	Transferred to Syracuse
Zep Jasper	12	G	6'1"	190	Senior	Augusta, GA	Graduated
Yohan Traore	21	F	6'10"	225	Freshman	Tours, France	Transferred to UC Santa Barbara
Allen Flanigan	22	G	6'6"	220	Senior	Little Rock, AR	Graduate transferred to Ole Miss
Babatunde Akingbola	23	C	6'10"	245	Senior	Ogun, Nigeria	Graduate transferred to George Washington
Chandler Leopard	25	G	6'3"	195	Senior	Athens, AL	Walk-on; Graduated transferred to Samford

=== Incoming transfers ===
Name	Number	Pos.	Height	Weight	Year	Hometown	Previous School
Chad Baker-Mazara	10	G/F	6'7"	190	Junior	Santo Domingo, Dominican Republic	Northwest Florida State College
Denver Jones	12	G	6'4"	190	Junior	New Market, AL	Florida International
CJ Williams	13	G	6'1"	155	Sophomore	Fayetteville, AR	Texas Tech
Addarin Scott	23	F/C	6'9"	207	Junior	Dallas, TX	Navarro College
Chaney Johnson	31	G	6'7"	215	Junior	Alabaster, AL	UAH

=== 2023 recruiting class ===
College recruiting information
Name	Hometown	School	Height	Weight	Commit date
Aden Holloway #4 PG	Charlotte, NC	Prolific Prep	6 ft 1 in (1.85 m)	165 lb (75 kg)	Aug 1, 2022
Aden Holloway #4 PG	Recruit ratings: Rivals: 247Sports: ESPN: (90)				
Overall recruit ranking: Rivals: 44 247Sports: 74
Note: In many cases, Scout, Rivals, 247Sports, On3, and ESPN may conflict in their listings of height and weight.; In these cases, the average was taken. ESPN grades are on a 100-point scale.; Sources: "Auburn 2023 Basketball Commitments". Rivals.; "2023 Auburn Tigers Recruiting Class". ESPN.; "2023 Team Ranking". Rivals.

=== 2024 recruiting class ===
College recruiting information (2024)
Name	Hometown	School	Height	Weight	Commit date
Tahaad Pettiford #3 PG	Jersey City, New Jersey	Hudson Catholic (NJ)	6 ft 1 in (1.85 m)	170 lb (77 kg)	Feb 2, 2023
Tahaad Pettiford #3 PG	Recruit ratings: Rivals: 247Sports: ESPN: (89)				
Jakhi Howard #21 SF	Boston, Massachusetts	Overtime Elite (GA)	6 ft 6 in (1.98 m)	180 lb (82 kg)	Nov 14, 2023
Jakhi Howard #21 SF	Recruit ratings: Rivals: 247Sports: ESPN: (86)				
Overall recruit ranking: Rivals: 19 247Sports: 27
Note: In many cases, Scout, Rivals, 247Sports, On3, and ESPN may conflict in their listings of height and weight.; In these cases, the average was taken. ESPN grades are on a 100-point scale.; Sources: "Auburn 2024 Basketball Commitments". Rivals.; "2024 Auburn Tigers Recruiting Class". ESPN.; "2024 Team Ranking". Rivals.

== Roster ==
2023–24 Auburn Tigers men's basketball team
Players
Coaches

Pos.	#	Name	Height	Weight	Year	Previous school	Hometown
G	0	K. D. Johnson	6 ft 0 in (1.83 m)	185 lb (84 kg)	Sr	Hargrave Military/Georgia	Atlanta, GA
G	1	Aden Holloway	6 ft 1 in (1.85 m)	165 lb (75 kg)	Fr	Prolific Prep	Charlotte, NC
F	2	Jaylin Williams	6 ft 8 in (2.03 m)	230 lb (104 kg)	Sr	Brantley County	Nahunta, GA
G	3	Tre Donaldson	6 ft 2 in (1.88 m)	190 lb (86 kg)	So	Florida State University School	Tallahassee, FL
F/C	4	Johni Broome	6 ft 10 in (2.08 m)	235 lb (107 kg)	Jr	Tampa Catholic/Morehead State	Plant City, FL
F	5	Chris Moore	6 ft 6 in (1.98 m)	230 lb (104 kg)	Sr	West Memphis	West Memphis, AR
G/F	10	Chad Baker-Mazara	6 ft 7 in (2.01 m)	190 lb (86 kg)	Jr	Colonia/Northwest Florida State	Santo Domingo, Dominican Republic
G	12	Denver Jones	6 ft 4 in (1.93 m)	190 lb (86 kg)	Jr	Memphis Day Academy/Florida International	New Market, AL
G	13	CJ Williams (W)	6 ft 1 in (1.85 m)	155 lb (70 kg)	So	Fayetteville/Texas Tech	Fayetteville, AR
G	14	Presley Patterson (W)	5 ft 11 in (1.8 m)	175 lb (79 kg)	So	Knoxville Catholic	Knoxville, TN
G	20	Carter Sobera	6 ft 5 in (1.96 m)	200 lb (91 kg)	Sr	Mountain Brook	Birmingham, AL
G	21	Blake Muschalek (W)	6 ft 3 in (1.91 m)	175 lb (79 kg)	Fr	Trinity Christian	Dallas, TX
F/C	23	Addarin Scott	6 ft 9 in (2.06 m)	207 lb (94 kg)	Jr	Dallas Carter/Navarro	Dallas, TX
G/F	24	Lior Berman	6 ft 4 in (1.93 m)	215 lb (98 kg)	Sr	Mountain Brook	Birmingham, AL
G	31	Chaney Johnson	6 ft 7 in (2.01 m)	215 lb (98 kg)	Jr	Thompson/UAH	Alabaster, AL
C	42	Haston Alexander (W)	6 ft 10 in (2.08 m)	230 lb (104 kg)	So	Covenant Christian School	Tuscumbia, AL
C	44	Dylan Cardwell	6 ft 11 in (2.11 m)	256 lb (116 kg)	Sr	McEachern	Augusta, GA
G	55	Jalen Harper (W)	6 ft 1 in (1.85 m)	175 lb (79 kg)	RS Sr	Pebblebrook/Shelton State CC	Mableton, GA

Head coach

- Bruce Pearl (Boston College)

Assistant coach(es)

- Ira Bowman (Penn)
- Steven Pearl (Tennessee)
- Corey Williams (Oklahoma State)

Legend

- (C) Team captain
- (S) Suspended
- (I) Ineligible
- (W) Walk-on
- Injured
- Current redshirt

Roster
Last update: July 10, 2023

- Carter Sobera was awarded a basketball scholarship for the second semester of the 2023–24 season.

== Schedule ==
Date time, TV	Rank^{#}	Opponent^{#}	Result	Record	High points	High rebounds	High assists	Site (attendance) city, state
Exhibition
November 1, 2023*; 7:00 pm		Auburn–Montgomery	W 102–66	–	18 – Jones	10 – Cardwell	8 – Donaldson	Neville Arena (9,121); Auburn, AL
Non-conference regular season
November 7, 2023*; 8:00 pm, ESPN		vs. No. 20 Baylor	L 82–88	0–1	19 – Holloway	11 – Broome	6 – Holloway	Sanford Pentagon (3,028); Sioux Falls, SD
November 10, 2023*; 7:00 pm, SECN+/ESPN+		Southeastern Louisiana	W 86–71	1–1	18 – Broome	11 – Tied	4 – Tied	Neville Arena (9,121); Auburn, AL
November 16, 2023*; 8:00 pm, ESPN2		vs. Notre Dame; Legends Classic semifinals	W 83–59	2–1	15 – Tied	7 – J. Williams	5 – Tied	Barclays Center (5,524); Brooklyn, NY
November 17, 2023*; 6:00 pm, ESPN2		vs. St. Bonaventure; Legends Classic championship	W 77–60	3–1	18 – Broome	10 – J. Williams	3 – Tied	Barclays Center (4,849); Brooklyn, NY
November 21, 2023*; 7:00 pm, SECN+/ESPN+		Alabama A&M	W 84–54	4–1	15 – C. Johnson	9 – Cardwell	6 – Baker-Mazara	Neville Arena (9,121); Auburn, AL
November 29, 2023*; 8:15 pm, ESPN2		Virginia Tech; ACC–SEC Challenge	W 74–57	5–1	30 – Broome	13 – Broome	3 – Tied	Neville Arena (9,121); Auburn, AL
December 3, 2023*; 12:00 pm, ESPN2		at Appalachian State	L 64–69	5–2	21 – Broome	13 – Broome	5 – Donaldson	Holmes Center (7,037); Boone, NC
December 9, 2023*; 1:00 pm, ESPN2		vs. Indiana; Holiday Hoopsgiving	W 104–76	6–2	24 – Tied	8 – Cardwell	7 – J. Williams	State Farm Arena (8,623); Atlanta, GA
December 13, 2023*; 7:00 pm, SECN+/ESPN+		vs. UNC Asheville; Rocket City Classic	W 87–62	7–2	15 – Donaldson	7 – Baker-Mazara	5 – Holloway	Von Braun Center (6,556); Huntsville, AL
December 17, 2023*; 12:00 pm, ESPN		USC	W 91–75	8–2	15 – Holloway	5 – Cardwell	6 – Holloway	Neville Arena (9,121); Auburn, AL
December 22, 2023*; 7:00 pm, SECN+/ESPN+		Alabama State	W 82–62	9–2	20 – J. Williams	13 – Broome	4 – Tied	Neville Arena (9,121); Auburn, AL
December 30, 2023*; 8:00 pm, SECN		Chattanooga	W 101–66	10–2	21 – J. Williams	9 – Cardwell	5 – Tied	Neville Arena (9,121); Auburn, AL
January 2, 2024*; 8:00 pm, SECN	No. 25	Penn	W 88–68	11–2	24 – Broome	12 – Broome	6 – Holloway	Neville Arena (9,121); Auburn, AL
SEC regular season
January 6, 2024; 1:00 pm, ESPN2	No. 25	at Arkansas	W 83–51	12–2 (1–0)	16 – Baker-Mazara	8 – Tied	4 – Donaldson	Bud Walton Arena (19,200); Fayetteville, AR
January 9, 2024; 8:00 pm, ESPN2	No. 16	Texas A&M	W 66–55	13–2 (2–0)	22 – J. Williams	8 – J. Williams	6 – Donaldson	Neville Arena (9,121); Auburn, AL
January 13, 2024; 5:00 pm, SECN	No. 16	LSU	W 93–78	14–2 (3–0)	19 – Baker-Mazara	7 – Tied	3 – Tied	Neville Arena (9,121); Auburn, AL
January 17, 2024; 8:00 pm, SECN	No. 13	at Vanderbilt	W 80–65	15–2 (4–0)	21 – J. Williams	12 – Broome	3 – Tied	Memorial Gymnasium (7,099); Nashville, TN
January 20, 2024; 7:30 pm, SECN	No. 13	No. 22 Ole Miss	W 82–59	16–2 (5–0)	13 – Tied	5 – Tied	3 – Tied	Neville Arena (9,121); Auburn, AL
January 24, 2024; 6:30 pm, ESPN	No. 8	at Alabama; Rivalry	L 75–79	16–3 (5–1)	25 – Broome	14 – Broome	3 – Tied	Coleman Coliseum (13,474); Tuscaloosa, AL
January 27, 2024; 2:30 pm, SECN	No. 8	at Mississippi State	L 58–64	16–4 (5–2)	14 – Broome	7 – Broome	3 – J. Williams	Humphrey Coliseum (9,175); Starkville, MS
January 31, 2024; 8:00 pm, ESPN2	No. 16	Vanderbilt	W 81–54	17–4 (6–2)	21 – J. Williams	11 – Broome	5 – Donaldson	Neville Arena (9,121); Auburn, AL
February 3, 2024; 5:00 pm, SECN	No. 16	at Ole Miss	W 91–77	18–4 (7–2)	16 – J. Williams	9 – Tied	7 – Broome	SJB Pavilion (9,631); Oxford, MS
February 7, 2024; 6:00 pm, ESPN2	No. 12	No. 16 Alabama; Rivalry	W 99–81	19–4 (8–2)	26 – J. Williams	7 – Broome	4 – Donaldson	Neville Arena (9,121); Auburn, AL
February 10, 2024; 2:30 pm, SECN	No. 12	at Florida	L 65–81	19–5 (8–3)	14 – Broome	10 – C. Johnson	4 – Baker-Mazara	O'Connell Center (10,808); Gainesville, FL
February 14, 2024; 7:30 pm, SECN	No. 13	No. 11 South Carolina	W 101–61	20–5 (9–3)	23 – J. Williams	5 – Baker-Mazara	5 – Cardwell	Neville Arena (9,121); Auburn, AL
February 17, 2024; 5:00 pm, ESPN	No. 13	No. 22 Kentucky; College GameDay	L 59–70	20–6 (9–4)	14 – Tied	11 – Broome	3 – Baker-Mazara	Neville Arena (9,121); Auburn, AL
February 24, 2024; 5:00 pm, SECN	No. 14	at Georgia	W 97–76	21–6 (10–4)	25 – Baker-Mazara	13 – Broome	4 – Baker-Mazara	Stegeman Coliseum (10,523); Athens, GA
February 28, 2024; 6:00 pm, ESPN2	No. 11	at No. 4 Tennessee	L 84–92	21–7 (10–5)	23 – Broome	9 – Broome	5 – Broome	Thompson-Boling Arena (22,547); Knoxville, TN
March 2, 2024; 3:00 pm, ESPN2	No. 11	Mississippi State	W 78–63	22–7 (11–5)	17 – Broome	6 – Broome	6 – Donaldson	Neville Arena (9,121); Auburn, AL
March 5, 2024; 8:00 pm, SECN	No. 13	at Missouri	W 101–74	23–7 (12–5)	17 – Broome	8 – Broome	5 – Holloway	Mizzou Arena (10,041); Columbia, MO
March 9, 2024; 5:30 pm, SECN	No. 13	Georgia	W 92–78	24–7 (13–5)	21 – Jones	7 – Baker-Mazara	5 – Tied	Neville Arena (9,121); Auburn, AL
SEC Tournament
March 15, 2024; 2:30 pm, ESPN	(4) No. 12	vs. (5) No. 15 South Carolina; Quarterfinals	W 86–55	25–7	18 – Broome	10 – Broome	4 – Donaldson	Bridgestone Arena (17,137); Nashville, TN
March 16, 2024; 12:00 pm, ESPN	(4) No. 12	vs. (9) Mississippi State; Semifinals	W 73–66	26–7	14 – Baker-Mazara	4 – Tied	6 – Holloway	Bridgestone Arena (16,499); Nashville, TN
March 17, 2024; 12:00 pm, ESPN	(4) No. 12	vs. (6) Florida; Championship	W 86–67	27–7	19 – Broome	11 – Broome	4 – Donaldson	Bridgestone Arena (18,532); Nashville, TN
NCAA Tournament
March 22, 2024*; 3:15 pm, TNT	(4 E) No. 7	vs. (13 E) Yale; First Round	L 76–78	27–8	24 – Broome	13 – Broome	4 – Tied	Spokane Veterans Memorial Arena (11,051); Spokane, WA
*Non-conference game. ^{#}Rankings from AP Poll. (#) Tournament seedings in parentheses. All times are in Central Time.

== Game summaries ==
This section will be filled in as the season progresses.

=== Auburn–Montgomery (exhibition) ===
November 1, 2023
7:00 p.m.

Recap

Auburn–Montgomery Warhawks 66, Auburn Tigers 102
Scoring by half: 29–49, 37–53
Pts: Jalen Gaston, 23; Rebs: Jalen Gaston, 10; Asts: Jalil Robinson, 5	Pts: Denver Jones, 18; Rebs: Dylan Cardwell, 10; Asts: Tre Donaldson, 8

Neville Arena, Auburn, AL
Attendance: 9,121
Referees: Steven Anderson, Todd Austin, Josue Nieves

=== vs No. 20 Baylor ===
ESPN

November 7, 2023
8:00 p.m.

Recap

Auburn Tigers 82, No. 20 Baylor Bears 88
Scoring by half: 43–34, 39–54
Pts: Aden Holloway, 19; Rebs: Johni Broome, 11; Asts: Aden Holloway, 6	Pts: Ja'Kobe Walter, 28; Rebs: Jalen Bridges, 8 Asts: Jayden Nunn, 3

Sanford Pentagon, Sioux Falls, SD
Attendance: 3,028
Referees: Doug Sirmons, Pat Adams, Terry Oglesby

=== Southeastern Louisiana ===
SECN+
ESPN+

November 10, 2023
7:00 p.m.

Recap

Southeastern Louisiana Lions 71, Auburn Tigers 86
Scoring by half: 28–39, 43–47
Pts: Roger McFarlane, 24; Rebs: Roger McFarlane, 11; Asts: Tied, 2	Pts: Johni Broome, 18; Rebs: Tied, 11; Asts: Tied, 4

Neville Arena, Auburn, AL
Attendance: 9,121
Referees: Mike Nance, Garrick Shannon, Hunter Allen

=== vs Notre Dame ===
ESPN2

November 16, 2023
8:00 p.m.

Recap

Auburn Tigers 83, Notre Dame Fighting Irish 59
Scoring by half: 39–33, 44–26
Pts: Tied, 15; Rebs: Jaylin Williams, 7 Asts: Tied, 5	Pts: J.R. Konieczny, 18; Rebs: J.R. Konieczny, 11; Asts: Tied, 2

Barclays Center, Brooklyn, NY
Attendance: 5,524
Referees: Matt Potter, A.J. Desai, Patrick Evans

=== vs St. Bonaventure ===
ESPN2

November 17, 2023
6:00 p.m.

Recap

Auburn Tigers 77, St. Bonaventure Bonnies 60
Scoring by half: 48–28, 29–32
Pts: J. Broome, 18; Rebs: J. Williams, 10; Asts: 4 Tied, 3	Pts: Chad Venning, 14; Rebs: Barry Evans, 7 Asts: Tied, 3

Barclays Center, Brooklyn, NY
Attendance: 4,849
Referees: Nathan Farrell, Byron Jarrett, Evon Burroughs

=== Alabama A&M ===
SECN+
ESPN+

November 21, 2023
7:00 p.m.

Recap

Alabama A&M Bulldogs 54, Auburn Tigers 84
Scoring by half: 15–49, 39–35
Pts: Chad Moodie, 9 Rebs: Chad Moodie, 7 Asts: Chad Moodie, 2	Pts: Chaney Johnson, 15; Rebs: Dylan Cardwell, 9 Asts: Chad Baker-Mazara, 6

Neville Arena, Auburn, AL
Attendance: 9,121
Referees: Pat Adams, Rob Rorke, Doug Sirmons

=== Virginia Tech ===
ESPN2

November 29, 2023
8:15 p.m.

Recap

Virginia Tech Hokies 57, Auburn Tigers 74
Scoring by half: 24–33, 33–41
Pts: Hunter Cattoor, 16; Rebs: Tied, 7 Asts: Brandon Rechsteiner, 2	Pts: Johni Broome, 30; Rebs: Johni Broome, 13; Asts: Tied, 3

Neville Arena, Auburn, AL
Attendance: 9,121
Referees: Don Daily, Bart Lenox, Olandis Poole

=== at Appalachian State ===
ESPN2

December 3, 2023
12:00 p.m.

Recap

Auburn Tigers 64, Appalachian State Mountaineers 69
Scoring by half: 31–33, 33–36
Pts: Johni Broome, 21; Rebs: Johni Broome, 13; Asts: Tre Donaldson, 5	Pts: Myles Tate, 18; Rebs: Donovan Gregory, 6 Asts: Donovan Gregory, 4

Holmes Center, Boone, NC
Attendance: 7,037
Referees: Terry Oglesby, Owen Shortt, Vladimir Voyard-Tadal

=== vs Indiana ===
ESPN2

December 9, 2023
1:00 p.m.

Recap

Auburn Tigers 104, Indiana Hoosiers 76
Scoring by half: 52–34, 52–42
Pts: Tied, 24; Rebs: Dylan Cardwell, 8 Asts: Jaylin Williams, 7	Pts: Malik Reneau, 15; Rebs: Kel'el Ware, 8 Asts: Malik Reneau, 3

State Farm Arena, Atlanta, GA
Attendance: 8,623
Referees: Anthony Jordan, Todd Austin, Courtney Green

=== vs UNC Asheville ===
SECN+
ESPN+

December 13, 2023
7:00 p.m.

Recap

UNC Asheville Bulldogs 62, Auburn Tigers 87
Scoring by half: 27–39, 35–48
Pts: Drew Pember, 23; Rebs: Jamon Battle, 5 Asts: Caleb Burgess, 6	Pts: Tre Donaldson, 15; Rebs: Chad Baker-Mazara, 7 Asts: Aden Holloway, 5

Von Braun Center, Huntsville, AL
Attendance: 6,556
Referees: Ron Groover, Lee Cassell, Vladimir Voyard-Tadal

=== USC ===
ESPN

December 17, 2023
12:00 p.m.

Recap

USC Trojans 75, Auburn Tigers 91
Scoring by half: 35–49, 40–42
Pts: Boogie Ellis, 22; Rebs: Kobe Johnson, 7 Asts: Tied, 3	Pts: Aden Holloway, 15; Rebs: Dylan Cardwell, 6 Asts: Aden Holloway, 6

Neville Arena, Auburn, AL
Attendance: 9,121
Referees: Don Daily, Terry Oglesby, K.B. Burdett Jr.

=== Alabama State ===
SECN+
ESPN+

December 22, 2023
7:00 p.m.

Recap

Alabama State Hornets 62, Auburn Tigers 82
Scoring by half: 25–46, 37–36
Pts: Tied, 16; Rebs: Ubong Okon, 7 Asts: 7 Tied, 1	Pts: Jaylin Williams, 20; Rebs: Johni Broome, 13; Asts: Tied, 4

Neville Arena, Auburn, AL
Attendance: 9,121
Referees: Chuck Jones, Tony Greene, Brian Dorsey

=== Chattanooga ===
SECN

December 30, 2023
8:00 p.m.

Recap

Chattanooga Mocs 66, Auburn Tigers 101
Scoring by half: 27–49, 39–52
Pts: Honor Huff, 15; Rebs: Sam Alexis, 6 Asts: Honor Huff, 4	Pts: Jaylin Williams, 22; Rebs: Dylan Cardwell, 9 Asts: Tied, 5

Neville Arena, Auburn, AL
Attendance: 9,121
Referees: Owen Shortt, Rob Rorke, Matt Jarman

=== Penn ===
SECN

January 2, 2024
8:00 p.m.

Recap

Penn Quakers 68, No. 25 Auburn Tigers 88
Scoring by half: 32–51, 36–37
Pts: Sam Brown, 20; Rebs: Tyler Perkins, 8 Asts: Nick Spinoso, 6	Pts: Johni Broome, 24; Rebs: Johni Broome, 12; Asts: Aden Holloway, 6

Neville Arena, Auburn, AL
Attendance: 9,121
Referees: Pat Adams, Bharat Ramnanan, Tony Chiazza

=== at Arkansas ===
ESPN2

January 6, 2024
1:00 p.m.

Recap

No. 25 Auburn Tigers 83, Arkansas Razorbacks 51
Scoring by half: 37–30, 46–21
Pts: Chad Baker-Mazara, 16; Rebs: Tied, 8 Asts: Tre Donaldson, 4	Pts: Keyon Menifield Jr., 14; Rebs: Trevon Brazile, 7 Asts: Keyon Menifield Jr., 4

Bud Walton Arena, Fayetteville, AR
Attendance: 19,200
Referees: Doug Shows, K.B. Burdett Jr., Chuck Jones

=== Texas A&M ===
ESPN2

January 9, 2024
8:00 p.m.

Recap

Texas A&M Aggies 55, No. 16 Auburn Tigers 66
Scoring by half: 22–30, 33–36
Pts: Henry Coleman III, 17; Rebs: Andersson Garcia, 13; Asts: Tyrece Radford, 3	Pts: Jaylin Williams, 22; Rebs: Jaylin Williams, 8 Asts: Tre Donaldson, 6

Neville Arena, Auburn, AL
Attendance: 9,121
Referees: Don Daily, Owen Shortt, Michael Roberts

=== LSU ===
SECN

January 13, 2024
5:00 p.m.

Recap

LSU Tigers 78, No. 16 Auburn Tigers 93
Scoring by half: 34–51, 44–42
Pts: Tied, 18; Rebs: Will Baker, 10; Asts: Tied, 3	Pts: Chad Baker-Mazara, 19; Rebs: Tied, 7 Asts: 5 Tied, 3

Neville Arena, Auburn, AL
Attendance: 9,121
Referees: Steven Anderson, Todd Austin, Lee Cassell

=== at Vanderbilt ===
SECN

January 17, 2024
8:00 p.m.

Recap

No. 13 Auburn Tigers 80, Vanderbilt Commodores 65
Scoring by half: 41–24, 39–41
Pts: Jaylin Williams, 21; Rebs: Johni Broome, 12; Asts: Tied, 3	Pts: Tyrin Lawerence, 15; Rebs: Ven-Allen Lubin, 6 Asts: Tyrin Lawrence, 2

Memorial Gymnasium, Nashville, TN
Attendance: 7,099
Referees: Terry Oglesby, Jeffrey Anderson, Courtney Green

=== No. 22 Ole Miss ===
SECN

January 20, 2024
7:30 p.m.

Recap

No. 22 Ole Miss Rebels 59, No. 13 Auburn Tigers 82
Scoring by half: 27–46, 32–36
Pts: Allen Flanigan, 10; Rebs: Jamarion Sharp, 8 Asts: Tied, 3	Pts: Tied, 13; Rebs: Tied, 5 Asts: 3 Tied, 3

Neville Arena, Auburn, AL
Attendance: 9,121
Referees: Joe Lindsay, Byron Jarrett, Patrick Evans

=== at Alabama ===
ESPN

January 24, 2024
6:30 p.m.

Recap

No. 8 Auburn Tigers 75, Alabama Crimson Tide 79
Scoring by half: 30–44, 45–35
Pts: Johni Broome, 25; Rebs: Johni Broome, 14; Asts: Tied, 3	Pts: Mark Sears, 22; Rebs: Grant Nelson, 11; Asts: Mark Sears, 8

Coleman Coliseum, Tuscaloosa, AL
Attendance: 13,474
Referees: Pat Adams, Don Daily, K.B. Burdett Jr.

=== at Mississippi State ===
SECN

January 27, 2024
2:30 p.m.

Recap

No. 8 Auburn Tigers 58, Mississippi State Bulldogs 64
Scoring by half: 21–21, 37–43
Pts: Johni Broome, 14; Rebs: Johni Broome, 7 Asts: Jaylin Williams, 3	Pts: Josh Hubbard, 17; Rebs: D.J. Jeffries, 12; Asts: Tolu Smith III, 3

Humphrey Coliseum, Starkville, MS
Attendance: 9,175
Referees: Bart Lenox, Vladimir Voyard-Tadal, Wil Howard

=== Vanderbilt ===
ESPN2

January 31, 2024
8:00 p.m.

Recap

Vanderbilt Commodores 54, No. 16 Auburn Tigers 81
Scoring by half: 27–37, 27–44
Pts: Ven-Allen Lubin, 17; Rebs: Ven-Allen Lubin, 12; Asts: Ezra Manjon, 4	Pts: Jaylin Williams, 21; Rebs: Johni Broome, 11; Asts: Tre Donaldson, 5

Neville Arena, Auburn, AL
Attendance: 9,121
Referees: Doug Shows, Terry Oglesby, Ted Valentine

=== at Ole Miss ===
SECN

February 3, 2024
5:00 p.m.

Recap

No. 16 Auburn Tigers 91, Ole Miss Rebels 77
Scoring by half: 35–44, 56–33
Pts: Jaylin Williams, 16; Rebs: Tied, 9 Asts: Johni Broome, 7	Pts: Allen Flanigan, 20; Rebs: Brandon Murray, 6 Asts: Jaylen Murray, 6

SJB Pavilion, Oxford, MS
Attendance: 9,631
Referees: Steven Anderson, Owen Shortt, Anthony Jordan

=== No. 16 Alabama ===
ESPN2

February 7, 2024
6:00 p.m.

Recap

No. 16 Alabama Crimson Tide 81, No. 12 Auburn Tigers 99
Scoring by half: 41–55, 40–44
Pts: Mark Sears, 25; Rebs: Mark Sears, 9 Asts: Mark Sears, 4	Pts: Jaylin Williams, 26; Rebs: Johni Broome, 7 Asts: Tre Donaldson, 4

Neville Arena, Auburn, AL
Attendance: 9,121
Referees: Doug Shows, Joe Lindsay, Courtney Green

=== at Florida ===
SECN

February 10, 2024
2:30 p.m.

Recap

No. 12 Auburn Tigers 65, Florida Gators 81
Scoring by half: 26–42, 39–39
Pts: Johni Broome, 14; Rebs: Chaney Johnson, 10; Asts: Chad Baker-Mazara, 4	Pts: Riley Kugel, 22; Rebs: Micah Handlogten, 9 Asts: Zyon Pullin, 3

O'Connell Center, Gainesville, FL
Attendance: 10,808
Referees: Don Daily, Bart Lenox, Patrick Evans

=== No. 11 South Carolina ===
SECN

February 14, 2024
7:30 p.m.

Recap

No. 11 South Carolina Gamecocks 61, No. 13 Auburn Tigers 101
Scoring by half: 28–50, 33–51
Pts: Meechie Johnson, 22; Rebs: Tied, 7 Asts: Meechie Johnson, 2	Pts: Jaylin Williams, 23; Rebs: Chad Baker-Mazara, 5 Asts: Dylan Cardwell, 5

Neville Arena, Auburn, AL
Attendance: 9,121
Referees: Terry Oglesby, Keith Kimble, Owen Shortt

=== No. 22 Kentucky ===
ESPN

February 17, 2024
5:00 p.m.

Recap

No. 22 Kentucky Wildcats 70, No. 13 Auburn Tigers 59
Scoring by half: 39–29, 31–30
Pts: Antonio Reeves, 22; Rebs: Ugonna Onyenso, 11; Asts: Tied, 3	Pts: Tied, 14; Rebs: Johni Broome, 11; Asts: Chad Baker-Mazara, 3

Neville Arena, Auburn, AL
Attendance: 9,121
Referees: Steven Anderson, Joe Lindsay, Vladimir Voyard-Tadal

=== at Georgia ===
SECN

February 24, 2024
5:00 p.m.

Recap

No. 14 Auburn Tigers 97, Georgia Bulldogs 76
Scoring by half: 45–34, 52–42
Pts: Chad Baker-Mazara, 25; Rebs: Johni Broome, 13; Asts: Chad Baker-Mazara, 4	Pts: Noah Thomasson, 18; Rebs: Russel Tchewa, 7 Asts: Silas Demary Jr., 2

Stegeman Coliseum, Athens, GA
Attendance: 10,523
Referees: Pat Adams, Bart Lenox, Todd Austin

=== at No. 4 Tennessee ===
ESPN2

February 28, 2024
6:00 p.m.

Recap

No. 11 Auburn Tigers 84, No. 4 Tennessee Volunteers 92
Scoring by half: 40–44, 44–48
Pts: Johni Broome, 23; Rebs: Johni Broome, 9 Asts: Johni Broome, 5	Pts: Dalton Knecht, 39; Rebs: Jonas Aidoo, 7 Asts: Zakai Ziegler, 9

Thompson-Boling Arena, Knoxville, TN
Attendance: 22,547
Referees: Don Daily, Steven Anderson, Byron Jarrett

=== Mississippi State ===
ESPN2

March 2, 2024
3:00 p.m.

Recap

Mississippi State Bulldogs 63, No. 11 Auburn Tigers 78
Scoring by half: 22–39, 41–39
Pts: Josh Hubbard, 23; Rebs: Tied, 10; Asts: Tied, 3	Pts: Johni Broome, 17; Rebs: Johni Broome, 6 Asts: Tre Donaldson, 6

Neville Arena, Auburn, AL
Attendance: 9,121
Referees: Terry Oglesby, Mike Nance, Anthony Jordan

=== at Missouri ===
SECN

March 5, 2024
8:00 p.m.

Recap

No. 13 Auburn Tigers 101, Missouri Tigers 74
Scoring by half: 44–39, 57–35
Pts: Johni Broome, 17; Rebs: Johni Broome, 8 Asts: Aden Holloway, 5	Pts: Sean East II, 21; Rebs: Aidan Shaw, 9 Asts: Sean East II, 3

Mizzou Arena, Columbia, MO
Attendance: 10,041
Referees: K.B. Burdett Jr., Owen Shortt, Chuck Jones

=== Georgia ===
SECN

March 9, 2024
5:30 p.m.

Recap

Georgia Bulldogs 78, No. 13 Auburn Tigers 92
Scoring by half: 31–45, 47–47
Pts: Silas Demary Jr., 15; Rebs: Russel Tchewa, 10; Asts: Russel Tchewa, 3	Pts: Denver Jones, 21; Rebs: Chad Baker-Mazara, 7 Asts: Tied, 5

Neville Arena, Auburn, AL
Attendance: 9,121
Referees: Doug Shows, Vladimir Voyard-Tadal, Lucas Santos

=== vs No. 15 South Carolina (SEC Quarterfinal) ===
ESPN

March 15, 2024
2:30 p.m.

Recap

No. 5 South Carolina Gamecocks 55, No. 4 Auburn Tigers 86
Scoring by half: 26–46, 29–40
Pts: B.J. Mack, 14; Rebs: 3 Tied, 8 Asts: Zachary Davis, 4	Pts: Johni Broome, 18; Rebs: Johni Broome, 10; Asts: Tre Donaldson, 4

Bridgestone Arena, Nashville, TN
Attendance: 17,137
Referees: Terry Oglesby, Bart Lenox, Byron Jarrett

=== vs Mississippi State (SEC Semifinal) ===
ESPN

March 16, 2024
12:00 p.m.

Recap

No. 9 Mississippi State Bulldogs 66, No. 4 Auburn Tigers 73
Scoring by half: 31–31, 35–42
Pts: Josh Hubbard, 20; Rebs: Tolu Smith III, 10; Asts: Tied, 3	Pts: Chad Baker-Mazara, 14; Rebs: 3 Tied, 4 Asts: Aden Holloway, 6

Bridgestone Arena, Nashville, TN
Attendance: 16,499
Referees: Joe Lindsay, K.B. Burdett Jr., Byron Jarrett

=== vs Florida (SEC Championship) ===
ESPN

March 17, 2024
12:00 p.m.

Recap

No. 6 Florida Gators 67, No. 4 Auburn Tigers 86
Scoring by half: 30–38, 37–48
Pts: Zyon Pullin, 15; Rebs: Tied, 7 Asts: Walter Clayton Jr., 3	Pts: Johni Broome, 19; Rebs: Johni Broome, 11; Asts: Tre Donaldson, 4

Bridgestone Arena, Nashville, TN
Attendance: 18,532
Referees: Terry Oglesby, Don Daily, Pat Adams

=== vs Yale (NCAA First Round) ===
TNT

March 22, 2024
3:15 p.m.

Recap

No. 13 Yale Bulldogs 78, No. 4 Auburn Tigers 76
Scoring by half: 34–41, 44–35
Pts: John Poulakidas, 28; Rebs: Tied, 5 Asts: Tied, 3	Pts: Johni Broome, 24; Rebs: Johni Broome, 13; Asts: Tied, 4

Spokane Veterans Memorial Arena, Spokane, WA
Attendance: 11,051
Referees: D.J. Carstensen, Kevin Brill, Bharat Ramnanan

== Statistics ==
Record	AUB	OPP
Scoring	2909	2391
Scoring Average	83.1	68.3
Field goals - Att	1010–2121	784–2029
Field goal %	.476	.386
3-point field goals - Att	280–795	205–678
3-point %	.352	.302
Free throws - Att	609–812	618–842
Free throw %	.750	.734
Rebounds	1324	1206
Assists	622	335
Turnovers	374	449
Steals	258	233
Blocked Shots	215	113

=== Team Highs ===
Team Game Highs
Stat	High	Opponent	Date
Points	104	Indiana Hoosiers	December 9, 2023
Field goals made	37	Chattanooga Mocs	December 30, 2023
Field Goal Attempts	72	Indiana Hoosiers	December 9, 2023
3 Points Made	14	Indiana Hoosiers; Georgia Bulldogs	December 9, 2023; February 24, 2024
3 Points Attempted	35	Penn Quakers	January 2, 2024
Free throws made	40	Alabama Crimson Tide	February 7, 2024
Free Throw Attempts	50	Alabama Crimson Tide	February 7, 2024
Rebounds	45	Alabama A&M Bulldogs	November 21, 2023
Assists	29	Georgia Bulldogs	March 9, 2024
Steals	15	LSU Tigers	January 13, 2024
Blocked Shots	12	Alabama Crimson Tide	February 7, 2024
Turnovers	17	Alabama State Hornets	December 22, 2023
Fouls	32	Baylor Bears	November 7, 2023

=== Individual Highs ===
Individual Game Highs
Stat	High	Opponent	Date
Minutes	35 – Jaylin Williams	Texas A&M Aggies	January 9, 2024
Points	30 – Johni Broome	Virginia Tech Hokies	November 29, 2023
Field goals made	11 – Johni Broome	Virginia Tech Hokies; Alabama Crimson Tide	November 29, 2023; January 24, 2024
Field Goal Attempts	19 – Johni Broome	Virginia Tech Hokies	November 29, 2023
3 Points Made	7 – Denver Jones	Georgia Bulldogs	March 9, 2024
3 Points Attempted	10 – Aden Holloway	LSU Tigers	January 13, 2024
Free throws made	9 – Jaylin Williams; Chad Baker-Mazara; Johni Broome	Alabama Crimson Tide; Kentucky Wildcats; Yale Bulldogs	February 7, 2024; February 17, 2024; March 22, 2024
Free Throw Attempts	13 – Johni Broome	Virginia Tech Hokies	November 29, 2023
Rebounds	14 – Johni Broome	Alabama Crimson Tide	January 24, 2024
Assists	7 – Jaylin Williams; Johni Broome	Indiana Hoosiers; Ole Miss Rebels	December 9, 2023; February 3, 2024
Steals	6 – Chad Baker-Mazara	LSU Tigers	January 13, 2024
Blocked Shots	5 – Dylan Cardwell; Johni Broome	Baylor Bears/LSU Tigers; Alabama Crimson Tide/Vanderbilt Commodores/Alabama Crimson Tide	November 7, 2023/January 13, 2024; January 24, 2024/January 31, 2024/February 7, 2024
Turnovers	4 – Tre Donaldson; Dylan Cardwell; Johni Broome; Chad Baker-Mazara; Chaney Johnson	Baylor Bears/Vanderbilt Commodores; Notre Dame Fighting Irish/Ole Miss Rebels; Alabama State Hornets/Ole Miss Rebels/Yale Bulldogs; Tennessee Volunteers/Mississippi State Bulldogs; Tennessee Volunteers	November 7, 2023/January 31, 2024; November 16, 2023/January 20, 2024; December 22, 2023/January 20, 2024/March 22, 2024; February 28, 2024/March 2, 2024; February 28, 2024
Fouls	6 – Johni Broome; K. D. Johnson	Baylor Bears; Virginia Tech Hokies	November 7, 2023; November 29, 2023

== Rankings ==
Ranking movements Legend: ██ Increase in ranking ██ Decrease in ranking — = Not ranked RV = Received votes т = Tied with team above or below
	Week																				
Poll	Pre	1	2	3	4	5	6	7	8	9	10	11	12	13	14	15	16	17	18	19	Final
AP	RV	RV	RV	RV	—	RV	RV	RV	25	16	13	8	16	12	13	14	11	13	12	7	18
Coaches	RV	RV	RV	RV	RV	RV	RV	RV	24	16	11	6т	16	11	12	14	11	14	12	7	17

== See also ==
- 2023–24 Auburn Tigers women's basketball team
