= 2023–24 Southeastern Conference men's basketball season =

- League: NCAA Division I
- Sport: Basketball
- Teams: 14
- TV partner(s): ESPN, SEC Network, CBS

Regular season
- Season champions: Tennessee
- Season MVP: Dalton Knecht, Tennessee

SEC tournament
- Venue: Bridgestone Arena, Nashville, Tennessee
- Champions: Auburn
- Runners-up: Florida
- Finals MVP: Johni Broome (Auburn)

SEC men's basketball seasons
- ← 2022–23 2024–25 →

2023–24 Southeastern Conference men's basketball standings
	Conf.				Overall
Team	W		L	PCT	W		L	PCT
No. 5 Tennessee	14	–	4	.778	27	–	9	.750
No. 20 Kentucky	13	–	5	.722	23	–	10	.697
No. 3т Alabama	13	–	5	.722	25	–	12	.676
No. 18 Auburn †	13	–	5	.722	27	–	8	.771
No. 25 South Carolina	13	–	5	.722	26	–	8	.765
Florida	11	–	7	.611	24	–	12	.667
Texas A&M	9	–	9	.500	21	–	15	.583
LSU	9	–	9	.500	17	–	16	.515
Mississippi State	8	–	10	.444	21	–	14	.600
Ole Miss	7	–	11	.389	20	–	12	.625
Georgia	6	–	12	.333	20	–	17	.541
Arkansas	6	–	12	.333	16	–	17	.485
Vanderbilt	4	–	14	.222	9	–	23	.281
Missouri	0	–	18	.000	8	–	24	.250
† 2024 SEC tournament winner Rankings from AP poll

The 2023–24 Southeastern Conference men's basketball season began with practices in October followed by the 2023–24 NCAA Division I men's basketball season, which started November 6, 2023. Conference began on January 6, 2024, and will end in March, after which 14 member teams will participate in the 2024 SEC men's basketball tournament at Bridgestone Arena in Nashville, Tennessee. The tournament champion will receive the conference's automatic bid to the 2024 NCAA tournament.

This will be the final season with 14 members of the conference as Texas and Oklahoma will join the conference before the start of the 2024–25

== Pre-season ==
=== Recruiting classes ===
Rankings
Team	ESPN	Rivals	On3 Recruits	247 Sports	Signees
Alabama		No. 22	No. 14	No. 16	4
Arkansas		No. 32	No. 11	No. 30	2
Auburn		–	No. 51	No. 67	2
Florida		No. 58	No. 60	No. 93	2
Georgia		No. 11	No. 18	No. 15	4
LSU		No. 42	No. 45	No. 50	2
Kentucky		–	No. 1	No. 1	8
Missouri		No. 23	No. 31	No. 27	3
Mississippi State		No. 20	No. 57	No. 36	5
Ole Miss		–	No. 48	No. 54	3
South Carolina		No. 44	No. 73	No. 52	3
Tennessee		No. 39	No. 21	No. 21	3
Texas A&M		No. 48	No. 59	No. 39	3
Vanderbilt		No. 26	No. 55	No. 37	5

=== Preseason watchlists ===
Below is a table of notable preseason watch lists.

Player	Wooden	Naismith	Cousy	West	Erving	Malone	Abdul-Jabbar	Olson
Aaron Bradshaw							✓	
Trevon Brazile		✓				✓		
Johni Broome	✓	✓					✓	
Justin Edwards	✓	✓			✓			
Dalton Knecht					✓			
Riley Kugel				✓				
Tramon Mark				✓				
Grant Nelson		✓				✓		
Antonio Reeves				✓				
Jamarion Sharp							✓	
Tolu Smith	✓	✓				✓		
Wade Taylor IV	✓	✓	✓					
Santiago Véscovi	✓	✓		✓				
D. J. Wagner			✓					
Zakai Zeigler			✓					

=== Preseason All-American teams ===
Player	AP	CBS	Fox Sports
Johni Broome	RV		
Tolu Smith	RV		
Wade Taylor IV	RV	1st Team	3rd Team

=== Preseason polls ===
	247 Sports	AP	Blue Ribbon	CBS Sports	Coaches	ESPN	Fox Sports	KenPom	NCAA Sports	Sports; Illustrated
Alabama	No. 16	No. 24	–	–	No. 24	No. 22	–	No. 10	No. 28	–
Arkansas	No. 10	No. 14	–	No. 16	No. 14	No. 16	No. 9	No. 14	No. 14	No. 20
Auburn	–	–	–	–	–	–	–	No. 15	No. 33	–
Florida	–	–	–	–	–	–	–	No. 39	–	–
Georgia	–	–	–	–	–	–	–	No. 57	–	–
Kentucky	–	No. 16	–	–	No. 16	No. 15	–	No. 18	No. 18	No. 23
LSU	–	–	–	–	–	–	–	No. 47	–	
Missouri	–	–	–	–	–	–	–	No. 55	–	–
Mississippi State	–	–	–	–	–	–	–	No. 27	No. 26	–
Ole Miss	–	–	–	No. 22	–	–	–	No. 82	–	–
South Carolina	–	–	–	–	–	–	–	No. 66	–	–
Tennessee	No. 9	No. 9	–	No. 4	No. 10	No. 8	No. 15	No. 8	No. 21	No. 6
Texas A&M	No. 19	No. 15	–	–	No. 19	No. 20	No. 16	No. 24	No. 23	No. 11
Vanderbilt	–	–	–	–	–	–	–	No. 79	–	–

=== SEC media days ===
The SEC conducted its 2023 SEC media days in Birmingham, Alabama on October 18 & 19, 2023 on the SEC Network.

The teams and representatives in respective order are as follows:

- Alabama – Nate Oats (HC), Aaron Estrada & Mark Sears
- Arkansas – Eric Musselman (HC), Trevon Brazile & Davonte Davis
- Auburn – Bruce Pearl (HC), Johni Broome & Jaylin Williams
- Florida – Todd Golden (HC), Will Richard & Tyrese Samuel
- Georgia – Mike White (HC), Justin Hill & Noah Thomasson
- Kentucky – John Calipari (HC), Trey Mitchell & Antonio Reeves
- LSU – Matt McMahon (HC), Derek Fountain & Jordan Wright
- Ole Miss – Chris Beard (HC), Allen Flanigan & Matthew Murrell
- Mississippi State – Chris Jans (HC), Cameron Matthews & Tolu Smith
- Missouri – Dennis Gates (HC), Noah Carter & Nick Honor
- South Carolina – Lamont Paris (HC), Ta'Lon Cooper & Meechie Johnson
- Tennessee – Rick Barnes (HC), Santiago Vescovi & Zakai Zeigler
- Texas A&M – Buzz Williams (HC), Tyrece Radford & Wade Taylor
- Vanderbilt – Jerry Stackhouse (HC), Tyrin Lawrence & Ezra Manion

Men's Basketball Preseason Poll
Place	Team
1.	Tennessee
2.	Texas A&M
3.	Arkansas
4.	Kentucky
5.	Alabama
6.	Auburn
7.	Mississippi State
8.	Florida
9.	Missouri
10.	Ole Miss
11.	Vanderbilt
12.	Georgia
13.	LSU
14.	South Carolina

=== SEC Preseason All-Conference ===
First Team

Name	School	Pos.	Yr.	Ht., Wt.	Hometown (Last School)
Trevon Brazile	Arkansas	F	So .	6′ 10″, 220	Springfield, MO
Johni Broome	Auburn	F	Jr.	6′ 10″, 240	Plant City, FL
Justin Edwards	Kentucky	G	Fr .	6′ 8″, 203	Philadelphia, PA
Grant Nelson	Alabama	F	Sr.	6′ 11″, 230	Devils Lake, ND
Tolu Smith	Mississippi State	F	Gr.	6′ 11″, 245	Bay St. Louis, MS
Wade Taylor IV	Texas A&M	G	Jr.	6′ 0″, 175	Dallas, TX
Santiago Vescovi	Tennessee	G	(redshirt) Sr.	6′ 3″, 192	Montevideo, Uruguay

Second Team

Name	School	Pos.	Yr.	Ht., Wt.	Hometown (Last School)
Davonte Davis	Arkansas	G	Sr.	6′ 1″, 185	Jacksonville, AR
Riley Kugel	Florida	G	Sr.	6′ 4″, 185	Orlando, FL
Antonio Reeves	Kentucky	G	So.	6′ 5″, 207	Chicago, IL
Mark Sears	Alabama	G	(redshirt) Sr.	6′ 5″, 205	Muscle Shoals, AL
Zakai Zeigler	Tennessee	G	Jr.	5′ 9″, 171	Long Island, NY

Honorable Mention

=== Midseason watchlists ===
Below is a table of notable midseason watch lists.

Player	Wooden	Naismith	Naismith DPOY	Robertson	Cousy	West	Erving	Malone	Abdul-Jabbar	Olson
Johni Broome										✓
Meechie Johnson										✓
Dalton Knecht	✓									✓
Antonio Reeves	✓					✓				✓
Mark Sears	✓									
Reed Sheppard	✓									
Wade Taylor IV	✓				✓					✓
Zakai Zeigler					✓					

== Regular season ==
The schedule was released in late October. Before the season, it was announced that for the seventh consecutive season, all regular-season conference games and conference tournament games would be broadcast nationally by ESPN Inc. family of networks including ABC, ESPN, ESPN2, ESPNU, and the SEC Network.

=== Multi-team tournaments ===
Team	Tournament	Finish
Alabama	Emerald Coast Classic	3rd
Arkansas	Battle 4 Atlantis	4th
Auburn	Legends Classic	1st
Florida	NIT Season Tip-Off	2nd
Georgia	Bahamas Championship	4th
Kentucky	−	−
LSU	Charleston Classic	5th
Missouri	−	−
Mississippi State	Hall of Fame Tip-Off	1st
Ole Miss	−	−
South Carolina	−	−
Tennessee	Maui Invitational	4th
Texas A&M	ESPN Events Invitational	3rd
Vanderbilt	Vegas Showdown	4th

=== ACC–SEC Challenge ===
Date	Visitor	Home	Site	Significance	Score	Conference record
Nov. 28	LSU	Syracuse	JMA Wireless Dome ● Syracuse, New York	ACC–SEC Challenge	Syracuse 80–57	ACC 1–0
Nov. 28	Notre Dame	South Carolina	Colonial Life Arena ● Columbia, South Carolina	ACC–SEC Challenge	South Carolina 65–53	Tied 1–1
Nov. 28	No. 21 Mississippi State	Georgia Tech	McCamish Pavilion ● Atlanta, Georgia	ACC–SEC Challenge	Georgia Tech 67–59	ACC 2–1
Nov. 28	Missouri	Pittsburgh	Petersen Events Center ● Pittsburgh, Pennsylvania	ACC–SEC Challenge	Missouri 71–64	Tied 2–2
Nov. 28	No. 8 Miami (FL)	No. 12 Kentucky	Rupp Arena ● Lexington, Kentucky	ACC–SEC Challenge	Kentucky 95–73	SEC 3–2
Nov. 28	NC State	Ole Miss	SJB Pavilion ● Oxford, Mississippi	ACC–SEC Challenge	Ole Miss 72–52	SEC 4–2
Nov. 28	Clemson	No. 23 Alabama	Coleman Coliseum ● Tuscaloosa, Alabama	ACC–SEC Challenge	Clemson 85–77	SEC 4–3
Nov. 29	Florida	Wake Forest	LJVM Coliseum ● Winston-Salem, North Carolina	ACC–SEC Challenge	Wake Forest 82–71	Tied 4-4
Nov. 29	No. 14 Texas A&M	Virginia	John Paul Jones Arena ● Charlottesville, Virginia	ACC–SEC Challenge	Virginia 59–47	ACC 5–4
Nov. 29	No. 10 Tennessee	No. 17 North Carolina	Dean Smith Center ● Chapel Hill, North Carolina	ACC–SEC Challenge	North Carolina 100–92	ACC 6–4
Nov. 29	Boston College	Vanderbilt	Memorial Gymnasium ● Nashville, Tennessee	ACC–SEC Challenge	Boston College 78–62	ACC 7–4
Nov. 29	Virginia Tech	Auburn	Neville Arena ● Auburn, Alabama	ACC–SEC Challenge	Auburn 74–57	ACC 7–5
Nov. 29	Georgia	Florida State	Donald L. Tucker Civic Center ● Tallahassee, Florida	ACC–SEC Challenge	Georgia 68–66	ACC 7–6
Nov. 29	No. 7 Duke	Arkansas	Bud Walton Arena ● Fayetteville, Arkansas	ACC–SEC Challenge	Arkansas 80–75	Tied 7–7

Team rankings are reflective of AP poll when the game was played, not current or final ranking

== Records vs other conferences ==
The SEC has a record of 136–46 in non-conference play for the 2023–24 season. Records shown for regular season only.

Regular season

Power 6 Conferences
Conference	Record
ACC	17–12
Big East	2–3
Big Ten	10–4
Big 12	2–10
Pac-12	6–3
Combined	37–32

Other Conferences
Conference	Record
America East	1–0
American	10–4
ASUN	7–0
Atlantic 10	5–1
Big Sky	1–0
Big South	8–1
Big West	0–0
Coastal	2–1
Conference USA	3–0
Horizon	1–0
Independents/Non-Division I	0–0
Ivy League	3–0
Metro Atlantic	3–0
Mid-American	0–0
Mid-Eastern Athletic	3–0
Missouri Valley	3–0
Mountain West	0–0
Northeast	2–0
Ohio Valley	4–0
Patriot	3–0
Southern	7–2
Southland	8–1
SWAC	14–2
Summit	1–0
Sun Belt	7–1
WCC	0–1 (Note: The only game between SEC and West Coast Conference teams in the 2023–24 regular season was Kentucky's loss to Gonzaga, a program generally considered by national media to be the equivalent of a power-conference team despite its "mid-major" affiliation.)
WAC	3–0
Combined	99–14

=== Record against ranked non-conference opponents ===
This is a list of games against ranked opponents only (rankings from the AP Poll at time of the game):

Date	Visitor	Home	Site	Significance	Score	Conference record
Nov. 7	No. 20 Baylor	Auburn†	Sanford Pentagon ● Sioux Falls, SD	−	Baylor 88−82	0−1
Nov. 14	No. 1 Kansas	No. 17 Kentucky†	United Center ● Chicago, IL	Champions Classic	Kansas 89−84	0−2
Nov. 17	No. 12 Miami (FL)	Georgia†	Baha Mar Convention Center ● Nassau, Bahamas	Bahamas Championship	Miami 79−68	0−3
Nov. 21	No. 2 Purdue	No. 7 Tennessee†	Stan Sheriff Center ● Honolulu, HI	Maui Invitational	Purdue 71−67	0−4
Nov. 21	No. 1 Kansas	No. 7 Tennessee†	Stan Sheriff Center ● Honolulu, HI	Maui Invitational	Kansas 69−60	0−5
Nov. 24	No. 19 Florida Atlantic	No. 12 Texas A&M†	State Farm Field House ● Kissimmee, FL	ESPN Events Invitational	Florida Atlantic 96−89	0−6
Nov. 24	No. 13 Baylor	Florida†	Barclays Center ● Brooklyn, NY	NIT Season Tip-Off	Baylor 95−91	0−7
Nov. 24	No. 14 North Carolina	No. 20 Arkansas†	Imperial Arena ● Nassau, Bahamas	Battle 4 Atlantis	North Carolina 87−72	0−8
Nov. 28	No. 8 Miami	No. 12 Kentucky	Rupp Arena ● Lexington, KY	ACC–SEC Challenge	Kentucky 95−73	1−8
Nov. 29	No. 7 Duke	Arkansas	Bud Walton Arena ● Fayetteville, AR	ACC–SEC Challenge	Arkansas 80−75	2−8
Nov. 29	No. 10 Tennessee	No. 17 North Carolina	Dean Smith Center ● Chapel Hill, NC	ACC–SEC Challenge	North Carolina 100−92	2−9
Dec. 6	South Carolina	No. 24 Clemson	Littlejohn Coliseum ● Clemson, SC	Rivalry	Clemson 72−67	2−10
Dec. 9	Missouri	No. 2 Kansas	Allen Fieldhouse ● Lawrence, KS	Border War	Kansas 73−64	2−11
Dec. 9	Alabama	No. 4 Purdue	Coca-Cola Coliseum ● Toronto, ON	Basketball Hall of Fame Series Toronto	Purdue 92−86	2−12
Dec. 9	No. 20 Illinois	No. 17 Tennessee	Thompson-Boling Arena ● Knoxville, TN	−	Tennessee 86−79	3−12
Dec. 9	No. 19 Oklahoma	Arkansas†	BOK Center ● Tulsa, OK	Crimson & Cardinal Classic	Oklahoma 79−70	3−13
Dec. 16	No. 4 Houston	Texas A&M	Toyota Center ● Houston, TX	The Halal Guys Showcase	Houston 70−66	3−14
Dec. 16	No. 19 Texas	LSU†	Toyota Center ● Houston, TX	The Halal Guys Showcase	Texas 96−85	3−15
Dec. 16	Alabama	No. 8 Creighton	CHI Health Center Omaha ● Omaha, NE	−	Creighton 85−82	3−16
Dec. 16	No. 9 North Carolina	No. 14 Kentucky	State Farm Arena ● Atlanta, GA	CBS Sports Classic/Rivalry	Kentucky 87−83	4−16
Dec. 20	No. 4 Arizona	Alabama	Footprint Center ● Phoenix, AZ	Jerry Colangelo Hall of Fame Series	Arizona 87−74	4−17
Dec. 22	No. 13 Illinois	Missouri†	Enterprise Center ● St. Louis, MO	Braggin' Rights	Illinois 97−73	4−18
Dec. 23	Vanderbilt	No. 23 Memphis	FedExForum ● Memphis, TN	−	Memphis 77−75	4−19

† denotes neutral site game

=== Conference schedule ===
This table summarizes the head-to-head results between teams in conference play.

	Alabama	Arkansas	Auburn	Florida	Georgia	Kentucky	LSU	Ole Miss	Mississippi State	Missouri	South Carolina	Tennessee	Texas A&M	Vanderbilt
vs. Alabama	–	0–1	1–1	1–1	0–1	1–0	0–2	0–1	0–2	0–1	0–1	2–0	0–1	0–1
vs. Arkansas	1-0	–	1–0	1–0	1–1	2–0	1–1	1–0	1–0	0–2	1–0	1–0	0–2	1–0
vs. Auburn	1–1	0–1	–	1–0	0–1	1–0	0–1	0–2	1–1	0–1	0–1	1–0	0–1	0–2
vs. Florida	1–1	0–1	0–1	–	0–2	1–1	0–1	1–0	0–1	0–2	1–0	1–0	1–0	0–1
vs. Georgia	1–0	1–1	1–0	2–0	–	1–0	1–1	0–1	1–0	0–1	1–1	1–0	1–0	0–1
vs. Kentucky	0–1	0–2	0–1	1–1	0–1	–	1–0	0–1	0–2	0–1	1–0	1–0	1–0	0–2
vs. LSU	2–0	1–1	1–0	1–0	1–1	0–1	–	0–1	1–0	0–0	0–1	1–0	1–1	0–2
vs. Ole Miss	1–0	0–1	2–0	0–1	1–0	1–0	1–0	–	1–1	0–2	2–0	1–0	0–1	0–1
vs. Mississippi State	2–0	0–1	1–1	1–0	0–1	2–0	0–1	1–1	–	0–1	1–0	0–1	1–0	0–1
vs. Missouri	1–0	2–0	1–0	2–0	1–0	1–0	0–0	2–0	1–0	–	2–0	1–0	2–0	1–0
vs. South Carolina	1–0	0–1	1–0	0–1	1–1	0–1	1–0	0–2	0–1	0–2	–	1–1	0–1	0–1
vs. Tennessee	0–2	0–2	0–0	0–1	0–1	0–1	0–1	0–1	1–0	0–1	1–1	–	1–1	0–2
vs. Texas A&M	1–0	2–0	1–0	0–1	0–1	0–1	1–1	1–0	0–1	0–2	1–0	1–1	–	1–0
vs. Vanderbilt	1–0	0–1	2–0	1–0	1–0	2–0	2–0	1–0	1–0	0–1	1–0	2–0	0–1	–
Total	13–5	6–12	12–4	11–6	6–11	12–5	8–9	7–10	8–9	0–18	12–5	14–3	8–9	3–14

Thru Mar. 6, 2024

=== Points scored ===
Team	For	Against	Difference
Alabama	2,724	2,404	320
Arkansas	2,322	2,376	-54
Auburn	2,496	2,047	449
Florida	2,553	2,326	227
Georgia	2,246	2,225	21
Kentucky	2,690	2,372	318
LSU	2,299	2,240	59
Ole Miss	2,267	2,199	68
Mississippi State	2,244	2,066	178
Missouri	2,170	2,290	-120
South Carolina	2,149	1,969	180
Tennessee	2,406	2,014	395
Texas A&M	2,190	2,095	95
Vanderbilt	2,009	2,260	-251

Through Mar. 6, 2024

== Rankings ==
*AP does not release post-NCAA tournament rankings

	Improvement in ranking
	Drop in ranking
RV	Received votes but were not ranked in Top 25
NV	No votes received

Team	Poll	Pre	Wk 2	Wk 3	Wk 4	Wk 5	Wk 6	Wk 7	Wk 8	Wk 9	Wk 10	Wk 11	Wk 12	Wk 13	Wk 14	Wk 15	Wk 16	Wk 17	Wk 18	Wk 19	Wk 20	Final
Alabama	AP	24	22	17	23	RV	RV	RV	RV	RV	RV	RV	RV	24	16	15	13	14	16	19	19	3т
Alabama	C	24	22	15	20	RV	RV	RV	NV	NV	RV	RV	RV	22	16	15	13	13	17	19	19	4
Arkansas	AP	14	14	20	RV	NV	NV	NV	NV	NV	NV	NV	NV	NV	NV	NV	NV	NV	NV	NV	NV	RV
Arkansas	C	14	14	RV	RV	NV	NV	NV	NV	NV	NV	NV	NV	NV	NV	NV	NV	NV	NV	NV	NV	NV
Auburn	AP	RV	RV	RV	RV	NV	RV	RV	RV	25	16	13	8	16	12	13	14	11	13	12	7	18
Auburn	C	RV	RV	RV	RV	RV	RV	RV	RV	24	16	11	6т	16	11	12	14	11	14	12	7	17
Florida	AP	RV	NV	NV	NV	NV	NV	NV	NV	NV	NV	NV	NV	NV	NV	RV	24	24	RV	RV	RV	RV
Florida	C	RV	NV	RV	RV	NV	NV	NV	NV	NV	NV	NV	NV	NV	NV	RV	RV	24	25	RV	23	RV
Georgia	AP	NV	NV	NV	NV	NV	NV	NV	NV	NV	NV	NV	NV	NV	NV	NV	NV	NV	NV	NV	NV	NV
Georgia	C	NV	NV	NV	NV	NV	NV	NV	NV	NV	NV	NV	NV	NV	NV	NV	NV	NV	NV	NV	NV	NV
Kentucky	AP	16	17	16	12	16	14	9	8	6	6	8	6	10	17	22	17	16	15	9	12	20
Kentucky	C	16	16	16	12	17	15	9	10	6	6	10	6т	8	15	20	17	15	14	9	12	19
LSU	AP	NV	NV	NV	NV	NV	NV	NV	NV	NV	NV	NV	NV	NV	NV	NV	NV	NV	NV	NV	NV	NV
LSU	C	NV	NV	NV	NV	NV	NV	NV	NV	NV	NV	NV	NV	NV	NV	NV	NV	NV	NV	NV	NV	NV
Ole Miss	AP	NV	NV	NV	RV	RV	RV	25	24	22	RV	22	RV	RV	RV	RV	NV	NV	NV	NV	NV	NV
Ole Miss	C	NV	NV	NV	NV	RV	25	25	22	19	23	21	RV	RV	RV	NV	NV	NV	NV	NV	NV	NV
Mississippi State	AP	RV	RV	25	21	NV	NV	RV	RV	RV	NV	RV	NV	NV	NV	NV	NV	RV	NV	NV	NV	NV
Mississippi State	C	RV	RV	25	22	RV	NV	NV	NV	NV	NV	NV	NV	NV	NV	NV	NV	NV	NV	NV	NV	NV
Missouri	AP	RV	NV	NV	NV	NV	NV	NV	NV	NV	NV	NV	NV	NV	NV	NV	NV	NV	NV	NV	NV	NV
Missouri	C	RV	NV	NV	NV	NV	NV	NV	NV	NV	NV	NV	NV	NV	NV	NV	NV	NV	NV	NV	NV	NV
South Carolina	AP	NV	NV	RV	RV	RV	RV	RV	RV	RV	RV	RV	NV	RV	15	11	20	18	17	15	16	24
South Carolina	C	NV	NV	RV	NV	NV	NV	RV	RV	NV	RV	NV	NV	RV	20	11	20	18	16	16	17	23
Tennessee	AP	9	7	7	10	17	12	8	6	5	5	6	5	5	6	8	5	4	4	5	6	5
Tennessee	C	10	8	8	11	13	10	7	7	5	5	7	5	5	6	9	5	4	4	5	6	5
Texas A&M	AP	15	13	12	14	21	RV	RV	RV	RV	NV	NV	NV	NV	NV	RV	NV	NV	NV	NV	NV	RV
Texas A&M	C	19	15	13	13	19	RV	RV	RV	RV	NV	NV	NV	NV	NV	RV	NV	NV	NV	NV	NV	RV
Vanderbilt	AP	NV	NV	NV	NV	NV	NV	NV	NV	NV	NV	NV	NV	NV	NV	NV	NV	NV	NV	NV	NV	NV
Vanderbilt	C	NV	NV	NV	NV	NV	NV	NV	NV	NV	NV	NV	NV	NV	NV	NV	NV	NV	NV	NV	NV	NV

== Postseason ==
=== SEC Tournament ===
First round Wednesday, March 13; SEC Network
12	Arkansas	90
13	Vanderbilt	85^{OT}
11	Georgia	64
14	Missouri	59

Second round Thursday, March 14; SEC Network
8	LSU	60
9	Mississippi State	70
5	South Carolina	80
12	Arkansas	66
7	Texas A&M	80
10	Ole Miss	71
6	Florida	85
11	Georgia	80

Quarterfinals; Friday, March 15; ESPN/SEC Network
1	Tennessee	56
9	Mississippi State	73
4	Auburn	86
5	South Carolina	55
2	Kentucky	87
7	Texas A&M	97
3	Alabama	88
6	Florida	102

Semifinals; Saturday, March 16; ESPN
9	Mississippi State	66
4	Auburn	73
7	Texas A&M	90
6	Florida	95

Championship; Sunday, March 17; ESPN
4	Auburn	86
6	Florida	67

=== NCAA Tournament ===
Seed	Region	School	First round	Second round	Sweet 16	Elite Eight	Final Four	Championship
2	Midwest	Tennessee	Defeated (15) Saint Peter's, 83–49	Defeated (7) Texas, 62–58	Defeated (3) Creighton, 82–75	Lost to (1) Purdue, 66–72	DNP	
3	South	Kentucky	Lost to (14) Oakland, 76–80	DNP				
4	West	Alabama	Defeated (13) Charleston, 109–96	Defeated (12) Grand Canyon, 72–61	Defeated (1) North Carolina, 89–87	Defeated (6) Clemson, 89–82	Lost to (E1) UConn, 72–86	DNP
4	East	Auburn	Lost to (13) Yale, 76–78	DNP				
6	Midwest	South Carolina	Lost to (11) Oregon, 73–87	DNP				
7	South	Florida	Lost to (10) Colorado, 100–102	DNP				
8	West	Mississippi State	Lost to (9) Michigan State, 51–69	DNP				
9	Midwest	Texas A&M	Defeated (8) Nebraska, 98–83	Lost to (1) Houston, 95–100 (OT)	DNP			
	Bids	W-L (%):	3–5 (.375)	2–1 (.667)	2–0 (1.000)	1–1 (.500)	0–1 (.000)	TOTAL: 8–8 (.500)

=== NIT ===
Seed	School	First round	Second round	Quarterfinals	Semifinals	Final
4	Georgia	Defeated Xavier, 78–76	Defeated (1) Wake Forest, 72–66	Defeated (2) Ohio State, 79–77	Lost to (1) Seton Hall, 67–84	DNP
4	LSU	Lost to North Texas, 77–84	DNP			
	W-L (%):	1–1 (.500)	1–0 (1.000)	1–0 (1.000)	0–1 (.000)	TOTAL: 3–2 (.600)

== Head coaches ==
=== Coaching changes ===
Coach	School	Reason	Replacement
Kermit Davis	Ole Miss	Mutually agreed to part ways	Chris Beard

=== Coaches ===
Note: Stats shown are before the beginning of the season. SEC records are from time at current school.

Team	Head coach	Previous job	Seasons at school	Record at school	SEC record	SEC titles	NCAA tournaments	NCAA Final Fours	NCAA Championships
Alabama	Nate Oats	Buffalo	5th	92–42 (.687)	49–23 (.681)	2	3	0	0
Arkansas	Eric Musselman	Nevada	5th	95–42 (.693)	41–31 (.569)	0	3	0	0
Auburn	Bruce Pearl	Tennessee	10th	187–111 (.628)	149–109 (.578)	1	4	1	0
Florida	Todd Golden	San Francisco	2nd	16–17 (.485)	9–9 (.500)	0	0	0	0
Georgia	Mike White	Florida	2nd	16–16 (.500)	78–64 (.549)	0	0	0	0
Kentucky	John Calipari	Memphis	15th	387–113 (.774)	186–60 (.756)	6	11	3	1
LSU	Matt McMahon	Murray State	2nd	14–19 (.424)	2–16 (.111)	0	0	0	0
Ole Miss	Chris Beard	Texas	1st	0–0 (–)	0–0 (–)	0	0	0	0
Mississippi State	Chris Jans	New Mexico State	2nd	21–13 (.618)	8–10 (.444)	0	1	0	0
Missouri	Dennis Gates	Cleveland State	2nd	25–10 (.714)	11–7 (.611)	0	1	0	0
South Carolina	Lamont Paris	Chattanooga	2nd	11–21 (.344)	4–14 (.222)	0	0	0	0
Tennessee	Rick Barnes	Texas	9th	173–92 (.653)	86–56 (.606)	1	5	1	0
Texas A&M	Buzz Williams	Virginia Tech	5th	76–47 (.618)	36–28 (.563)	0	1	0	0
Vanderbilt	Jerry Stackhouse	Memphis Grizzlies (assistant)	5th	61–69 (.469)	24–46 (.343)	0	0	0	0

Notes:

- SEC records, conference titles, etc. are from time at current school and are through the end the 2022–23 season.
- NCAA tournament appearances are from time at current school only.
- NCAA Final Fours and Championship include time at other schools.

== Awards and honors ==
=== SEC Players of the Week ===
Throughout the regular season, the SEC offices will honor 2 players based on performance by naming them player of the week and freshman of the week.

Week	Player of the Week	School	Freshman of the Week	School	Ref.
November 13, 2023	Dalton Knecht	Tennessee	Aden Holloway	Auburn	
November 20, 2023	Henry Coleman III	Texas A&M	Josh Hubbard	Mississippi State	
November 27, 2023	Tyrese Samuel	Florida	D. J. Wagner	Kentucky	
December 4, 2023	Trevon Brazile	Arkansas	Reed Sheppard	Kentucky	
December 11, 2023	Jaylin Williams	Auburn	Aden Holloway (2)	Auburn	
December 18, 2023	Wade Taylor IV	Texas A&M	D. J. Wagner (2)	Kentucky	
December 26, 2023	Jimmy Bell Jr.	Mississippi State	Reed Sheppard (2)	Kentucky	
January 2, 2024	Keyon Menifield Jr.	Arkansas	Mike Williams III	LSU	
January 8, 2024	Jordan Wright	LSU	Meechie Johnson	South Carolina	
January 15, 2024	Mark Sears	Alabama	Josh Hubbard (2)	Mississippi State	
January 15, 2024	Dalton Knecht (2)	Tennessee	Josh Hubbard (2)	Mississippi State	
January 22, 2024	Dalton Knecht (3)	Tennessee	D. J. Wagner (3)	Kentucky	
January 29, 2024	Mark Sears (2)	Alabama	Josh Hubbard (3)	Mississippi State	
February 5, 2024	Johni Broome	Auburn	Rob Dillingham	Kentucky	
February 12, 2024	Tyrece Radford	Texas A&M	Collin Murray-Boyles	South Carolina	
February 19, 2024	Jonas Aidoo	Tennessee	Josh Hubbard (4)	Mississippi State	
February 26, 2024	Khalif Battle	Arkansas	Justin Edwards	Kentucky	
March 4, 2024	Meechie Johnson	South Carolina	Reed Sheppard (3)	Kentucky	
March 4, 2024	Dalton Knecht (4)	Tennessee	Reed Sheppard (3)	Kentucky	

==== Totals per school ====
School	Total
Kentucky	8
Mississippi State	5
Tennessee	5
Auburn	4
Arkansas	3
South Carolina	3
Texas A&M	3
Alabama	2
LSU	2
Florida	1
Georgia	0
Ole Miss	0
Missouri	0
Vanderbilt	0

=== 2023–24 Season statistic leaders ===
Scoring leaders
Rk	Player	PTS	PPG
1	Mark Sears	303	20.2
2	Antonio Reeves	261	18.6
3	Meechie Johnson	252	18.0
4	Wade Taylor IV	260	17.3
5	Sean East II	259	17.3

Rebound leaders
Rk	Player	REB	RPG
1	Tyrese Samuel	122	8.7
2	Andersson Garcia	130	8.7
3	Jimmy Bell Jr.	120	8.6
4	Johni Broome	128	8.5
5	Henry Coleman III	118	8.4

Field goal leaders (avg 5 fga/gm)
Rk	Player	FG	FGA	PCT
1	Tyrese Samuel	74	119	62.2%
2	Sean East II	100	180	55.6%
3	Johni Broome	87	157	55.4%
4	Mark Sears	97	177	54.8%
5	Tramon Mark	75	138	54.3%

Assist leaders
Rk	Player	AST	APG
1	Zakai Zeigler	69	4.9
2	Zyon Pullin	53	4.8
3	Ta'Lon Cooper	66	4.4
4	Reed Sheppard	58	4.1
5	Rob Dillingham	57	4.1

Block leaders
Rk	Player	BLK	BPG
1	Jamarion Sharp	36	2.6
2	Johni Broome	32	2.1
3	Aidan Shaw	26	1.7
4	Trevon Brazile	22	1.6
5	Jonas Aidoo	20	1.4

Free throw leaders
Rk	Player	FT	FTA	PCT
1	Ezra Manjon	62	70	88.6%
2	Jabri Abdur-Rahim	60	68	88.2%
3	Grant Nelson	50	57	87.7%
4	Chad Baker-Mazara	41	47	87.2%
5	Josh Hubbard	38	44	86.4%

Steal leaders
Rk	Player	STL	SPG
1	Cameron Matthews	37	2.6
2	Reed Sheppard	35	2.5
3	Wade Taylor IV	36	2.4
4	Jordan Wright	33	2.2
5	Matthew Murrell	30	2.1

Three point leaders
Rk	Player	3P	3PA	%
1	Sean East II	22	41	53.7%
2	Reed Sheppard	30	56	53.6%
3	Sam Walters	20	39	51.3%
4	Tamar Bates	19	38	50.0%
5	Mark Sears	40	81	49.4%

== 2024 NBA draft ==
PG	Point guard	SG	Shooting guard	SF	Small forward	PF	Power forward	C	Center

Player	Team	Round	Pick #	Position	School	Nationality
Reed Sheppard	Houston Rockets	1	2	SG	Kentucky	United States
Rob Dillingham	San Antonio Spurs	1	8	PG/SG	Kentucky	United States
Dalton Knecht	Los Angeles Lakers	1	17	SF	Tennessee	United States
Antonio Reeves	Orlando Magic	2	47	SG/SF	Kentucky	United States

== Home game attendance ==
Team	Stadium	Capacity	Game 1	Game 2	Game 3	Game 4	Game 5	Game 6	Game 7	Game 8	Game 9	Game 10	Game 11	Game 12	Game 13	Game 14	Game 15	Game 16	Game 17	Game 18	Total	Average	% of Capacity
Alabama	Coleman Coliseum	15,383	9,078	10,900	9,828	10,300	10,725	9,703	9,950	10,208	11,569	13,474†	13,474†	13,474†	13,474†	11,077	13,474†	–			170,708	11,381	73.98%
Arkansas	Bud Walton Arena	19,368	19,200	19,200	19,200	19,200	**20,344**†	19,200	19,200	19,200	19,200	19,200	19,200	19,200	19,200	19,200	19,200	19,200	19,200		327,544	19,267	99.47%
Auburn	Neville Arena	9,121	**9,121**†	**9,121**†	**9,121**†	**9,121**†	**9,121**†	**9,121**†	**9,121**†	**9,121**†	**9,121**†	**9,121**†	**9,121**†	**9,121**†	**9,121**†	**9,121**†	**9,121**†	–			136,815	**9,121**	100.0%
Florida	O'Connell Center	11,255	7,023	6,675	10,013	6,813	8,023	9,869	10,106	10,445	8,484	10,045	10,808†	9,007	10,358	9,072	11,009				137,750	9,183	81.59%
Georgia	Stegeman Coliseum	10,523	8,176	5,699	6,046	5,694	9,017	6,523	6,045	6,603	7,793	7,820	**10,523**†	9,243	**10,523**†	**10,523**†	**10,523**†	**10,523**†	8,165	6,219	145,658	8,092	76.89%
Kentucky	Rupp Arena	20,545	18,438	19,646	18,960	18,680	20,246	20,119	19,990	**20,659**†	20,086	20,016	20,283	20,068	20,265	20,186	20,064	20,342	20,322	20,332	358,702	19,928	96.99%
LSU	Pete Maravich Assembly Center	13,215	7,922	7,265	7,940	7,365	7,413	7,104	7,388	8,256	7,218	8,777	9,085	7,880	7,755	9,493†	9,463	7,621			127,945	7,997	60.51%
Missouri	Mizzou Arena	15,061	11,486	**15,061**†	9,656	9,690	9,745	9,762	10,885	10,623	12,407	11,135	11,489	11,020	9,814	10,620	10,089	11,021	10,041		184,544	10,856	72.08%
Mississippi State	Humphrey Coliseum	9,100	7,525	7,337	7,561	7,186	6,804	7,035	8,160	**9,142**	**9,172**	**9,175**	8,755	**9,219**	**9,381**†	**9,256**	–				115,708	8,265	90.82%
Ole Miss	SJB Pavilion	9,500	6,141	6,665	6,331	7,465	9,416	6,950	7,981	7,934	7,570	8,404	8,207	**10,630**†	9,631	8,598	8,486	7,722	-		105,592	8,122	85.49%
South Carolina	Colonial Life Arena	18,000	11,216	10,449	15,215	10,936	10,006	9,455	10,203	11,070	11,382	12,404	**18,000**†	13,553	**18,000**†	14,310	16,570	16,978	**18,000**†		227,747	13,397	74.42%
Tennessee	Thompson–Boling Arena	21,678	17,046	16,859	16,513	**21,678**	16,013	17,609	16,858	**21,932**	17,332	**21,678**	20,667	**21,678**	**21,678**	**22,322**	**22,547**†	–			292,410	19,494	89.92%
Texas A&M	Reed Arena	12,989	8,802	10,689	8,310	9,565	5,475	8,610	10,525	9,540	9,623	12,610†	11,793	12,995	8,789	9,255	8,163				144,744	9,650	74.29%
Vanderbilt	Memorial Gymnasium	14,316	5,506	5,346	5,175	5,247	5,516	5,468	5,210	5,146	5,773	8,703	7,099	13,852†	6,905	11,678	6,564	5,821	6,696		115,705	6,806	47.54%
Total		14,290																			2,591,572	11,539	80.74%

Bold – At or exceed capacity
†Season high
