= Southwest DeKalb High School =

Public high school in Decatur, Georgia, United States

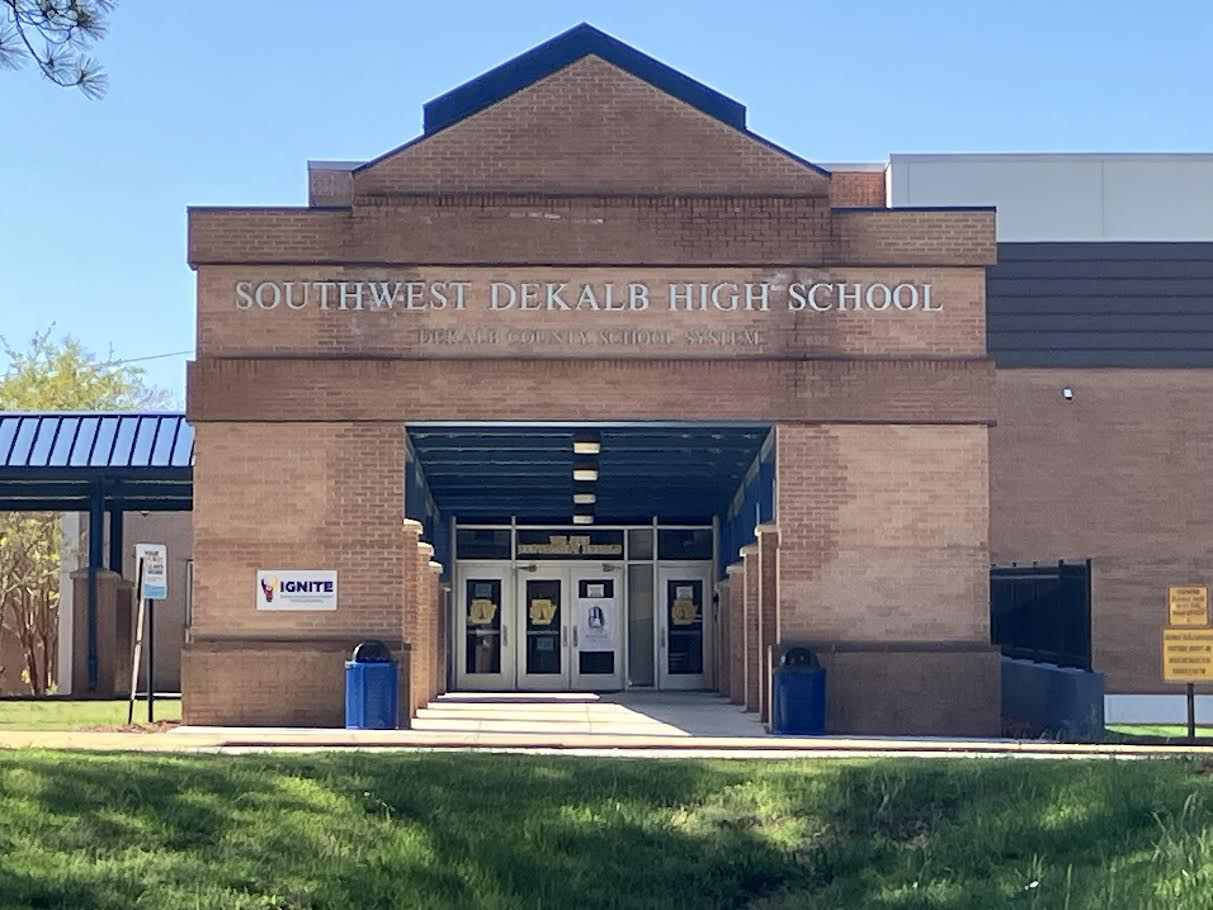
- Southwest Dekalb High School (April 2025)

Location
- 2863 Kelley Chapel Rd; Decatur, Georgia; United States; 33°42′09″N 84°13′29″W

Information
- Type: Public magnet
- Motto: "Home of the Mighty Panthers"
- Established: 1928
- Principal: Brandon Thompson
- Teaching staff: 80.40 (FTE)
- Grades: 9–12
- Enrollment: 1,207 (2023-2024)
- Student to teacher ratio: 15.01
- Campus: Suburban
- Colors: Navy and old gold
- Mascot: Panther
- Website: swdekalbhs.dekalb.k12.ga.us

Southwest DeKalb High School (SWD) is a high school located in unincorporated DeKalb County, Georgia, United States. It is a part of the DeKalb County School District. It houses one of the two High Achievers Magnet Programs in DeKalb County, the other being Chamblee High School. There are also three Special Interest Magnet schools in Dekalb County. Arabia Mountain High School - Environment, Energy, and Engineering, Columbia High School - Math, Science, and Technology, and the DeKalb School of the Arts. (Dekalb County Schools, January 2022)

== Awards and recognitions ==
In 2006, SWD was honored by the College Board as a model of excellence for AP class implementation.

In 2009, school administrators reported that students were enrolled in AP courses in chemistry, biology, physics, calculus, English, European history, French, Spanish, government, U.S. history, world history, economics, statistics and psychology.

In 2011, the school was one of 14 recognized nationally by the College Board for leading the nation in helping African American and/or Latino students to succeed on Advanced Placement exams. It was the only Georgia school to be honored.

== Band ==
The SWD High School Band was the only marching band to perform in the opening ceremonies of the 1996 Summer Olympics. They were also featured in the hit movie Drumline in 2002; the movie used students from Southwest DeKalb High School band as well as from other DeKalb County high schools as extras. After the movie, record producer Dallas Austin tapped the marching band for a sequel. 20th Century Fox was not interested in the production of a sequel, so instead Austin decided to produce a reality television show, Drumroll: SWD, which aired on Peachtree TV, a Turner Broadcasting Station.

The band was invited to Italy for the Tournament of Roses parade.

The SWD High School Band was also credited on Mariah Carey's album Memoirs of an Imperfect Angel on the track "Up Out My Face (The Reprise)."

The marching band was invited to perform in the movie Stomp the Yard 2: Homecoming. They also performed on season four of America's Got Talent. The Marching Panthers rival is Stephenson High School located in Stone Mountain, Georgia.

== Athletics ==
The football team has won numerous region titles: 1972, 73, 77, 78, 81, 83, 84, 87, 88, 89, 90, 94, 96, 99, 00, 09, 2015, 2018, and 2019. They won the Georgia AAA state championship in 1973 and the AAAA state championship in 1995.

The SWD boys' track and field teams have won ten state titles, most recently in 2023, including national championships in 1996 and 2007. The SWD girls' track and field teams have won five state titles, in 1984, 2007, 2008, 2009, and 2011.

The SWD wrestling team have won 11 Region titles and also have 10 individual State wrestling championship titles including those won by (2x Rock Yasin, (2x Daquan Warner,Gabe Echols, Darrin Smith, Jerrell Baskins and 2x State Champion Isaiah Scott. DeKalb County School District first female State Champion Ayla Evans.

The SWD girls' basketball team won the Georgia 4A state championship in 2008, 2009, and 2010, and the 5A title in 2013 and in 2016.

The SWD boys basketball team won the Georgia 5A region championship in 2003 and 2019, the 4A region title in 2011.

== Notable alumni ==
- Steve Berry – novelist
- Quincy Carter – former National Football League quarterback
- Cosey Coleman – former NFL offensive guard
- Shamari DeVoe – lead singer of Blaque; cast member on The Real Housewives of Atlanta
- William DuVall – lead singer of Alice in Chains and Comes With The Fall
- Shaq Goodwin – basketball player and 2012 McDonald's All-American
- K. D. Johnson – basketball player
- Fred Jones – former NFL wide receiver
- Eddie Miller – former NFL wide receiver
- Jonathon Mincy – NFL cornerback
- Mariah the Scientist – singer-songwriter
- Money Man – rapper
- Morgan Snow – track and field athlete; hurdler
- Terrance Smith – NFL linebacker
- Angelo Taylor – Olympic gold medalist, track and field, suspended by SafeSport for sexual misconduct
- Terrence Trammell – Olympic silver medalist, track and field
- Khalil "Saint Cassius" Walton – Grammy Award-winning songwriter and musician
- Porsha Williams – granddaughter of civil rights activist Hosea Williams; cast member on The Real Housewives of Atlanta
- Rodney Williams – former NFL punter
- Rock Ya-Sin – NFL cornerback
