= 2023–24 Florida Gators men's basketball team =

American college basketball season

2023–24 Florida Gators men's basketball

NCAA tournament, First round
- Conference: Southeastern Conference
- Record: 24–12 (11–7 SEC)
- Head coach: Todd Golden (2nd season)
- Assistant coaches: Carlin Hartman (2nd season); Kevin Hovde (2nd season); Korey McCray (2nd season); John Andrzejek (1st season); Taurean Green (1st season)
- Home arena: O'Connell Center

2023–24 Southeastern Conference men's basketball standings
	Conf.				Overall
Team	W		L	PCT	W		L	PCT
No. 5 Tennessee	14	–	4	.778	27	–	9	.750
No. 20 Kentucky	13	–	5	.722	23	–	10	.697
No. 3т Alabama	13	–	5	.722	25	–	12	.676
No. 18 Auburn †	13	–	5	.722	27	–	8	.771
No. 25 South Carolina	13	–	5	.722	26	–	8	.765
Florida	11	–	7	.611	24	–	12	.667
Texas A&M	9	–	9	.500	21	–	15	.583
LSU	9	–	9	.500	17	–	16	.515
Mississippi State	8	–	10	.444	21	–	14	.600
Ole Miss	7	–	11	.389	20	–	12	.625
Georgia	6	–	12	.333	20	–	17	.541
Arkansas	6	–	12	.333	16	–	17	.485
Vanderbilt	4	–	14	.222	9	–	23	.281
Missouri	0	–	18	.000	8	–	24	.250
† 2024 SEC tournament winner Rankings from AP poll

The 2023–24 Florida Gators men's basketball team represented the University of Florida during the 2023–24 NCAA Division I men's basketball season. The Gators, led by second-year head coach Todd Golden, played their home games at the O'Connell Center in Gainesville, Florida as members of the Southeastern Conference (SEC).

== Previous season ==
The Gators finished the 2022–23 season 16–17, 9–9 in SEC play, to finish in eighth place. They lost in the first round of the NIT to UCF.

== Offseason ==
=== Departures ===
Departures
Name	Number	Pos.	Height	Weight	Year	Hometown	Notes	Ref.
Myreon Jones	0	G	6' 3"	177	Graduate student	Birmingham, AL	Graduated	
CJ Felder	1	F	6' 7"	240	Senior	Sumter, SC	Transferred to McNeese	
Trey Bonham	2	G	6' 0"	170	Junior	Mobile, AL	Transferred to Chattanooga	
Alex Fudge	3	F	6' 9"	200	Sophomore	Jacksonville, FL	Undrafted free agent; signed with Los Angeles Lakers	
Niels Lane	4	G	6' 5"	215	Junior	Freehold, NJ	Transferred to Delaware	
Kyle Lofton	11	G	6' 3"	188	Graduate student	Hillside, NJ	Graduated	
Colin Castleton	12	F	6' 11"	250	Senior	DeLand, FL	Undrafted free agent; signed with Los Angeles Lakers	
Kowacie Reeves	14	G	6' 6"	192	Sophomore	Macon, GA	Transferred to Georgia Tech	
Jason Jitoboh	33	C	6' 11"	300	Senior	Abuja, Nigeria	Transferred to Tennessee State	

=== Incoming transfers ===
Incoming transfers
Name	Number	Pos.	Height	Weight	Year	Hometown	Previous school	Ref.
Zyon Pullin	0	G	6' 4"	205	Graduate student	Pleasant Hill, CA	UC Riverside	
Walter Clayton Jr.	1	G	6' 3"	195	Junior	Lake Wales, FL	Iona	
Micah Handlogten	3	C	7' 1"	227	Sophomore	Huntersville, NC	Marshall	
Tyrese Samuel	4	F	6' 10"	235	Graduate Student	Montreal, QC	Seton Hall	
EJ Jarvis	15	F	6' 8"	220	Graduate Student	Washington, D.C.	Yale	
Julian Rishwain	23	G	6' 5"	190	Graduate Student	Los Angeles, CA	San Francisco	

=== 2023 recruiting class ===
College recruiting information
Name	Hometown	School	Height	Weight	Commit date
Alex Condon; F	Perth, Australia	NBA Global Academy	6 ft 10 in (2.08 m)	230 lb (100 kg)	Feb 2, 2023
Alex Condon; F	Recruit ratings: 247Sports:				
Thomas Haugh; F	New Oxford, PA	Perkiomen School	6 ft 9 in (2.06 m)	200 lb (91 kg)	Jun 29, 2022
Thomas Haugh; F	Recruit ratings: Rivals: 247Sports: ESPN: (79)				
Overall recruit ranking:
Note: In many cases, Scout, Rivals, 247Sports, On3, and ESPN may conflict in their listings of height and weight.; In these cases, the average was taken. ESPN grades are on a 100-point scale.; Sources: "Florida 2023 Basketball Commitments". Rivals.; "2023 Team Ranking". Rivals.

== Roster ==
2023–24 Florida Gators men's basketball team
Players
Coaches

Pos.	#	Name	Height	Weight	Year	Previous school	Hometown
G	0	Zyon Pullin	6 ft 4 in (1.93 m)	206 lb (93 kg)	GS	College Park HS; UC Riverside	Pleasant Hill, CA
G	1	Walter Clayton Jr.	6 ft 3 in (1.91 m)	195 lb (88 kg)	Jr	Bartow HS; Iona	Lake Wales, FL
G	2	Riley Kugel	6 ft 5 in (1.96 m)	207 lb (94 kg)	So	Dr. Phillips HS	Orlando, FL
C	3	Micah Handlogten	7 ft 1 in (2.16 m)	235 lb (107 kg)	So	SouthLake Christian Academy; Marshall	Lake Norman, NC
F	4	Tyrese Samuel	6 ft 10 in (2.08 m)	239 lb (108 kg)	GS	Orangeville Prep; Seton Hall	Montreal, QC
G	5	Will Richard	6 ft 4 in (1.93 m)	206 lb (93 kg)	Jr	Woodward Academy; Belmont	Fairburn, GA
F	10	Thomas Haugh	6 ft 9 in (2.06 m)	210 lb (95 kg)	Fr	Perkiomen School	New Oxford, PA
G	11	Denzel Aberdeen	6 ft 5 in (1.96 m)	190 lb (86 kg)	So	Dr. Phillips HS	Orlando, FL
G	12	Alex Klatsky (W)	6 ft 4 in (1.93 m)	206 lb (93 kg)	RS Sr	Ranney School	Colts Neck, NJ
F	13	Aleks Szymczyk	6 ft 10 in (2.08 m)	250 lb (113 kg)	So	Gymnasium München Nord	Frankfurt, Germany
G	20	Jack May (W)	6 ft 4 in (1.93 m)	195 lb (88 kg)	RS Jr	Saint Andrew's School	Boca Raton, FL
F/C	21	Alex Condon	6 ft 11 in (2.11 m)	230 lb (104 kg)	Fr	NBA Global Academy	Perth, Australia
G	22	Bennett Andersen (W)	6 ft 2 in (1.88 m)	190 lb (86 kg)	Sr	Jesuit HS	Tampa, FL
G	23	Julian Rishwain	6 ft 5 in (1.96 m)	200 lb (91 kg)	GS	Notre Dame HS; San Francisco	Los Angeles, CA
G	30	Kajus Kublickas	6 ft 2 in (1.88 m)	171 lb (78 kg)	Fr	Zalgiris II	Kaunas, Lithuania
G	33	Cooper Josefsberg (W)	6 ft 4 in (1.93 m)	195 lb (88 kg)	Fr	Riviera Prep	Miami, FL

Head coach

- Todd Golden (Saint Mary's)

Assistant coach(es)

- Carlin Hartman (Tulane)
- Kevin Hovde (Richmond)
- Korey McCray (Mercer)

Legend

- (C) Team captain
- (S) Suspended
- (I) Ineligible
- (W) Walk-on
- Injured
- Current redshirt

Roster
Last update: April 2, 2024

== Schedule and results ==
Date time, TV	Rank^{#}	Opponent^{#}	Result	Record	High points	High rebounds	High assists	Site (attendance) city, state
Non-conference regular season
November 6, 2023*; 8:00 p.m., SECN+/ESPN+		Loyola (MD)	W 93–73	1–0	23 – Kugel	8 – tied	5 – Clayton Jr.	O'Connell Center (7,023); Gainesville, FL
November 10, 2023*; 7:00 p.m., ACCN		vs. Virginia; Hall of Fame Series	L 70–73	1–1	16 – Richard	14 – Handlogten	5 – Clayton Jr.	Spectrum Center (6,783); Charlotte, NC
November 14, 2023*; 7:00 p.m., SECN+/ESPN+		Florida A&M	W 89–68	2–1	20 – Richard	8 – Samuel	5 – Clayton Jr.	O'Connell Center (6,675); Gainesville, FL
November 17, 2023*; 7:00 p.m., SECN		Florida State; Rivalry	W 89–68	3–1	19 – Clayton Jr.	10 – Haugh	5 – Clayton Jr.	O'Connell Center (10,031); Gainesville, FL
November 22, 2023*; 9:30 p.m., ESPN2		vs. Pittsburgh; NIT Season Tip-Off semifinals	W 86–71	4–1	28 – Clayton Jr.	10 – Samuel	8 – Pullin	Barclays Center (1,873); Brooklyn, NY
November 24, 2023*; 5:30 p.m., ESPN		vs. No. 13 Baylor; NIT Season Tip-Off championship	L 91–95	4–2	25 – Kugel	9 – Kugel	5 – Pullin	Barclays Center (1,620); Brooklyn, NY
November 29, 2023*; 7:15 p.m., ESPNU		at Wake Forest; ACC–SEC Challenge	L 71–82	4–3	24 – Kugel	8 – Samuel	5 – Pullin	LJVM Coliseum (8,165); Winston-Salem, NC
December 5, 2023*; 7:00 p.m., SECN+/ESPN+		Merrimack	W 77–57	5–3	26 – Clayton Jr.	16 – Condon	3 – tied	O'Connell Center (6,813); Gainesville, FL
December 9, 2023*; 4:00 p.m., SECN		vs. Richmond; Orange Bowl Basketball Classic	W 87–76	6–3	21 – Richard	14 – Samuel	6 – Clayton Jr.	Amerant Bank Arena (8,162); Sunrise, FL
December 14, 2023*; 7:00 p.m., SECN		vs. East Carolina; Florida Tipoff	W 70–65	7–3	22 – Clayton Jr.	12 – Condon	4 – tied	RP Funding Center (3,073); Lakeland, FL
December 19, 2023*; 7:00 p.m., ESPN		vs. Michigan; Jumpman Invitational	W 106–101 ^{2OT}	8–3	22 – Pullin	11 – Samuel	5 – Pullin	Spectrum Center (7,027); Charlotte, NC
December 22, 2023*; 4:00 p.m., SECN+/ESPN+		Grambling State	W 96–57	9–3	17 – Richard	10 – Samuel	6 – Pullin	O'Connell Center (8,023); Gainesville, FL
December 30, 2023*; 1:00 p.m., ESPNU		Quinnipiac	W 97–72	10–3	22 – Richard	9 – tied	3 – tied	O'Connell Center (9,869); Gainesville, FL
SEC regular season
January 6, 2024; 12:30 p.m., ESPN		No. 6 Kentucky; Rivalry	L 85–87	10–4 (0–1)	23 – tied	12 – Handlogten	3 – tied	O'Connell Center (10,106); Gainesville, FL
January 10, 2024; 9:00 p.m., SECN		at Ole Miss	L 85–103	10–5 (0–2)	23 – Clayton Jr.	15 – Condon	3 – tied	SJB Pavilion (7,570); Oxford, MS
January 13, 2024; 4:00 p.m., ESPN		Arkansas	W 90–68	11–5 (1–2)	20 – Kugel	11 – Samuel	8 – Pullin	O'Connell Center (10,445); Gainesville, FL
January 16, 2024; 5:00 p.m., ESPN2		at No. 6 Tennessee	L 66–85	11–6 (1–3)	16 – Clayton Jr.	11 – Samuel	4 – Pullin	Thompson–Boling Arena (17,332); Knoxville, TN
January 20, 2024; 8:00 p.m., ESPNU		at Missouri	W 79–67	12–6 (2–3)	17 – Samuel	12 – Handlogten	3 – tied	Mizzou Arena (11,489); Columbia, MO
January 24, 2024; 8:30 p.m., SECN		Mississippi State	W 79–70	13–6 (3–3)	23 – Richard	9 – Richard	3 – Pullin	O'Connell Center (8,484); Gainesville, FL
January 27, 2024; 12:00 p.m., ESPN2		Georgia	W 102–98 ^{OT}	14–6 (4–3)	23 – Handlogten	17 – Handlogten	8 – Pullin	O'Connell Center (10,045); Gainesville, FL
January 31, 2024; 8:00 p.m., ESPN		at No. 10 Kentucky; Rivalry	W 94–91 ^{OT}	15–6 (5–3)	23 – Clayton Jr.	13 – Samuel	7 – Pullin	Rupp Arena (20,068); Lexington, KY
February 3, 2024; 4:00 p.m., ESPN2		at Texas A&M	L 66–67	15–7 (5–4)	18 – Pullin	11 – Condon	8 – Pullin	Reed Arena (11,793); College Station, TX
February 10, 2024; 3:30 p.m., SECN		No. 12 Auburn	W 81–65	16–7 (6–4)	22 – Kugel	9 – Handlogten	3 – Pullin	O'Connell Center (10,808); Gainesville, FL
February 13, 2024; 8:00 p.m., SECN		LSU	W 82–80	17–7 (7–4)	21 – Clayton Jr.	7 – tied	3 – tied	O'Connell Center (9,007); Gainesville, FL
February 17, 2024; 1:00 p.m., SECN		at Georgia	W 88–82	18–7 (8–4)	21 – Clayton Jr.	7 – tied	5 – Pullin	Stegeman Coliseum (10,523); Athens, GA
February 21, 2024; 7:00 p.m., ESPN2	No. 24	at No. 13 Alabama	L 93–98 ^{OT}	18–8 (8–5)	27 – Clayton Jr.	13 – Handlogten	6 – Pullin	Coleman Coliseum (11,077); Tuscaloosa, AL
February 24, 2024; 1:00 p.m., SECN	No. 24	Vanderbilt	W 77–64	19–8 (9–5)	21 – Richard	9 – Condon	6 – Pullin	O'Connell Center (10,358); Gainesville, FL
February 28, 2024; 6:30 p.m., SECN	No. 24	Missouri	W 83–74	20–8 (10–5)	28 – Samuel	12 – Handlogten	5 – Clayton Jr.	O'Connell Center (9,072); Gainesville, FL
March 2, 2024; 12:00 p.m., ESPN	No. 24	at No. 18 South Carolina	L 76–81	20–9 (10–6)	20 – Clayton Jr.	6 – Haugh	7 – Pullin	Colonial Life Arena (16,978); Columbia, SC
March 5, 2024; 7:00 p.m., ESPN		No. 16 Alabama	W 105–87	21–9 (11–6)	23 – Richard	7 – Haugh	3 – tied	O'Connell Center (11,009); Gainesville, FL
March 9, 2024; 4:30 p.m., SECN		at Vanderbilt	L 78–79	21–10 (11–7)	20 – Pullin	8 – Condon	8 – Pullin	Memorial Gymnasium (6,442); Nashville, TN
SEC tournament
March 14, 2024; 9:30 p.m., SECN	(6)	vs. (11) Georgia; Second round	W 85–80	22–10	22 – Clayton Jr.	15 – Samuel	8 – Pullin	Bridgestone Arena (13,771); Nashville, TN
March 15, 2024; 9:30 p.m., SECN	(6)	vs. (3) No. 19 Alabama; Quarterfinals	W 102–88	23–10	23 – Clayton Jr.	9 – Haugh	4 – Clayton Jr.	Bridgestone Arena (18,244); Nashville, TN
March 16, 2024; 3:30 p.m., ESPN	(6)	vs. (7) Texas A&M; Semifinals	W 95–90	24–10	20 – Aberdeen	9 – Condon	5 – tied	Bridgestone Arena (16,499); Nashville, TN
March 17, 2024; 1:00 p.m., ESPN	(6)	vs. (4) No. 12 Auburn; Championship	L 67–86	24–11	15 – Pullin	7 – tied	13 – Clayton Jr.	Bridgestone Arena (18,532); Nashville, TN
NCAA tournament
March 22, 2024; 4:30 p.m., TBS	(7 S)	vs. (10 S) Colorado; First round	L 100–102	24–12	33 – Clayton Jr.	9 – Aberdeen	6 – Condon	Gainbridge Fieldhouse (16,702); Indianapolis, IN
*Non-conference game. ^{#}Rankings from AP poll. (#) Tournament seedings in parentheses. S=South region. All times are in Eastern.

== Rankings ==
Ranking movements Legend: ██ Increase in ranking ██ Decrease in ranking — = Not ranked RV = Received votes
	Week																				
Poll	Pre	1	2	3	4	5	6	7	8	9	10	11	12	13	14	15	16	17	18	19	Final
AP	RV	—	—	—	—	—	—	—	—	—	—	—	—	RV	RV	24	24	RV	RV	RV	RV
Coaches	RV	—	RV	RV	—	—	—	—	—	RV	—	—	—	RV	RV	RV	24	25	RV	23	RV
