= K. D. Johnson =

American basketball player (born 2001)

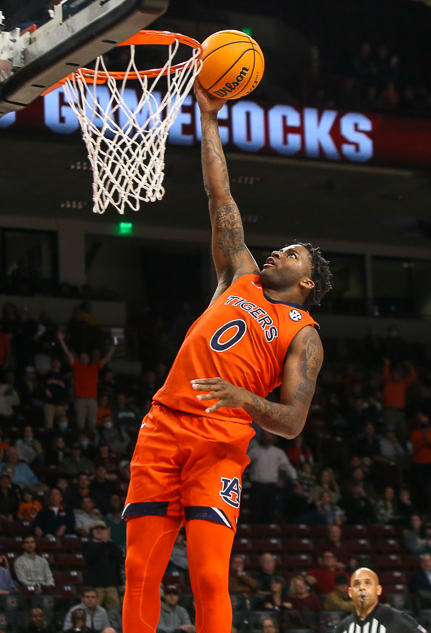
- Johnson with Auburn in 2022

Keila Basket
- Position: Point guard
- League: Estonian-Latvian Basketball League

Personal information
- Born: May 25, 2001 (age 25)
- Listed height: 6 ft 0 in (1.83 m)
- Listed weight: 204 lb (93 kg)

Career information
- High school: Southwest DeKalb (Decatur, Georgia); Hargrave Military Academy (Chatham, Virginia)
- College: Georgia (2020–2021); Auburn (2021–2024); George Mason (2024–2025)
- NBA draft: 2025: undrafted
- Playing career: 2025–present

Career history
- 2025–present: Keila Coolbet

Career highlights
- SEC All-Freshman Team (2021)

Kadarius "K. D." Johnson (born May 25, 2001) is an American basketball player for Keila Coolbet of the Latvian-Estonian Basketball League. He previously played for the George Mason Patriots, Auburn Tigers and the Georgia Bulldogs.

== High school career ==
Johnson played basketball for Southwest DeKalb High School in Decatur, Georgia. As a junior, he averaged 21.9 points, 5.9 rebounds, 5.3 assists and 4.5 steals per game, receiving Georgia Class 5A Player of the Year honors. Johnson played a postgraduate season at Hargrave Military Academy in Chatham, Virginia. He averaged 26.2 points, 7.4 assists, 4.7 rebounds and 3.1 steals per game per game, leading his team to a 37–4 record and the Final Four of the National Prep Tournament. A four-star recruit, he committed to playing college basketball for Georgia in October 2019, despite never having an official visit, over offers from Texas A&M, Tennessee and Ole Miss, among others.

== College career ==
Johnson missed the first 10 games of his freshman season for academic reasons before being cleared to play on January 11, 2021. Two days later, he made his debut, recording 21 points, seven rebounds and four steals in a 95–77 loss to Auburn. On February 13, Johnson posted a season-high 24 points and four steals in a 115–82 loss to Alabama. As a freshman, he averaged 13.5 points, 2.8 rebounds and 1.8 steals per game in 16 games, earning Southeastern Conference (SEC) All-Freshman Team honors. For his sophomore season, Johnson transferred to Auburn.

== Professional career ==
On September 24, 2025, Johnson signed with Keila Coolbet of the Latvian–Estonian Basketball League.

== Career statistics ==
Legend
GP	Games played	GS	Games started	MPG	Minutes per game
FG%	Field goal percentage	3P%	3-point field goal percentage	FT%	Free throw percentage
RPG	Rebounds per game	APG	Assists per game	SPG	Steals per game
BPG	Blocks per game	PPG	Points per game	**Bold**	Career high

=== College ===
Year	Team	GP	GS	MPG	FG%	3P%	FT%	RPG	APG	SPG	BPG	PPG
2020–21	Georgia	16	0	22.5	**.422**	**.387**	.615	2.8	1.2	1.8	**.2**	**13.5**
2021–22	Auburn	34	**31**	**27.8**	.386	.290	.721	**2.9**	1.6	**1.9**	.1	12.3
2022–23	Auburn	33	0	21.9	.381	.333	.694	1.9	1.3	1.1	.0	8.9
2023–24	Auburn	**35**	1	17.7	.378	.271	**.774**	1.8	1.3	1.1	**.2**	7.1
2024–25	George Mason	34	1	21.9	.418	.370	.724	2.7	**2.7**	1.3	.1	7.9
Career		152	33	22.3	.394	.320	.707	2.4	1.7	1.4	.1	9.5
