= Wendell Green Jr. =

American basketball player (born 2002)

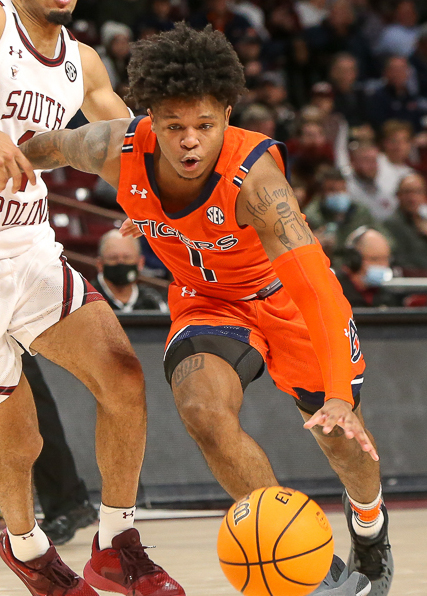
- Green with Auburn in 2022

No. 1 – Ilirija
- Position: Point guard
- League: Slovenian League; ABA League

Personal information
- Born: August 7, 2002 (age 24) Detroit, Michigan, U.S.
- Listed height: 5 ft 11 in (1.80 m)
- Listed weight: 175 lb (79 kg)

Career information
- High school: Detroit Country Day (Beverly Hills, Michigan); La Lumiere (La Porte, Indiana)
- College: Eastern Kentucky (2020–2021); Auburn (2021–2023)
- NBA draft: 2023: undrafted
- Playing career: 2023–present

Career history
- 2024: Novi Pazar
- 2024: Indios de San Francisco
- 2024: Keflavík
- 2024–2025: Bashkimi
- 2025–present: Ilirija

Career highlights
- Icelandic Super Cup (2024); First-team All-OVC (2021); OVC All-Newcomer Team (2021); Second-team All-SEC (2023)

Wendell Jerome Green Jr. (born August 7, 2002) is an American professional basketball player for Ilirija of the Slovenian League and the ABA League. He played college basketball for the Eastern Kentucky Colonels and the Auburn Tigers.

== High school career ==
Green played basketball for Detroit Country Day School in Beverly Hills, Michigan. As a sophomore, he averaged 19.5 points, eight assists and seven rebounds per game. For his junior season, Green transferred to La Lumiere School in La Porte, Indiana. At La Lumiere, he played alongside teammates Isaiah Stewart, Keion Brooks Jr., Jaden Ivey, Jeremy Sochan and Kamari Lands. As a junior, he helped his team reach the title game at GEICO Nationals. Green committed to playing college basketball for Eastern Kentucky over offers from DePaul, Rhode Island and TCU.

== College career ==
On January 2, 2021, Green posted a freshman season-high 30 points and five rebounds for Eastern Kentucky in an 80–75 win against Austin Peay. As a freshman, he averaged 15.8 points, five assists, 3.4 rebounds and 1.6 steals per game, earning First Team All-Ohio Valley Conference (OVC) and All-Newcomer Team honors. He was a five-time OVC Freshman of the Week selection.

For his sophomore season, Green transferred to Auburn.

Green would earn 2nd team All-SEC honors during his junior year. Green would break the Auburn record for most consecutive free throw makes without a miss, hitting 28 straight free throws. Two seasons later, Green’s record was broken by Chad Baker-Mazara. Following his junior season, Green elected to forgo the remainder of his college eligibility and enter the 2023 NBA draft.

== Professional career ==
After going undrafted in the 2023 NBA draft, Green joined the Cleveland Cavaliers for the 2023 NBA Summer League.

On October 28, 2023, Green was selected in the 2023 NBA G League draft by the Maine Celtics, but was waived on November 9.

In January 2024, Green signed with OKK Novi Pazar. In 14 league games, he averaged 20.8 points and 4.3 assists per game. In July, he played for the War Ready in The Basketball Tournament. Following the tournament, he joined Indios de San Francisco de Macorís of the Liga Nacional de Baloncesto.

On 25 July 2024, Green signed with Keflavík of the Icelandic Úrvalsdeild karla for the 2024–2025 season. On 28 September, he won the Icelandic Super Cup after Keflavík defeated reigning national champions Valur 98–88 in the cup final. He was released by Keflavík in November after averaging 23.2 points on 37% shooting in five Úrvalsdeild games.

On 30 December 2024, Green signed for Bashkimi of the Kosovo Basketball Superleague and Liga Unike.

== Career statistics ==
Legend
GP	Games played	GS	Games started	MPG	Minutes per game
FG%	Field goal percentage	3P%	3-point field goal percentage	FT%	Free throw percentage
RPG	Rebounds per game	APG	Assists per game	SPG	Steals per game
BPG	Blocks per game	PPG	Points per game	**Bold**	Career high

=== College ===
Year	Team	GP	GS	MPG	FG%	3P%	FT%	RPG	APG	SPG	BPG	PPG
2020–21	Eastern Kentucky	29	25	**30.5**	**.396**	**.364**	.769	3.4	5.0	1.6	**.1**	**15.8**
2021–22	Auburn	**34**	5	26.4	.365	.317	**.844**	**3.7**	**5.1**	1.5	.0	12.0
2022–23	Auburn	**34**	**34**	28.2	.364	.295	.842	3.2	4.1	**1.7**	.0	13.7
Career		97	64	28.3	.375	.323	.820	3.5	4.7	1.6	.0	13.7

== Personal life ==
Green is the son of Wendell Green Sr. and Rhonda Dalton-Green. Green is a Christian.
