= 2022–23 Auburn Tigers men's basketball team =

American college basketball season

2022–23 Auburn Tigers men's basketball

Cancún Challenge Riviera Division champions

NCAA tournament, Second round
- Conference: Southeastern Conference
- Record: 21–13 (10–8 SEC)
- Head coach: Bruce Pearl (9th season)
- Assistant coaches: Ira Bowman (5th season); Wes Flanigan (5th season); Steven Pearl (6th season)
- Home arena: Neville Arena

2022–23 Southeastern Conference men's basketball standings
	Conf.				Overall
Team	W		L	PCT	W		L	PCT
No. 1 Alabama†	16	–	2	.889	31	–	6	.838
No. 17 Texas A&M	15	–	3	.833	25	–	10	.714
Kentucky	12	–	6	.667	22	–	12	.647
No. 23 Missouri	11	–	7	.611	25	–	10	.714
No. 20 Tennessee	11	–	7	.611	25	–	11	.694
Vanderbilt	11	–	7	.611	22	–	15	.595
Auburn	10	–	8	.556	21	–	13	.618
Florida	9	–	9	.500	16	–	17	.485
Mississippi State	8	–	10	.444	21	–	13	.618
Arkansas	8	–	10	.444	22	–	14	.611
Georgia	6	–	12	.333	16	–	16	.500
South Carolina	4	–	14	.222	11	–	21	.344
Ole Miss	3	–	15	.167	12	–	21	.364
LSU	2	–	16	.111	14	–	19	.424
† 2023 SEC tournament winner Rankings from AP poll

The 2022–23 Auburn Tigers men's basketball team represented Auburn University during the 2022–23 NCAA Division I men's basketball season as a member of the Southeastern Conference. The team's head coach was Bruce Pearl in his ninth season at Auburn. The team played their home games at Neville Arena in Auburn, Alabama. They finished the season 20–11, 10–8 in SEC play to finish in seventh. As the No. 7 seed, they were defeated by No. 10 seed Arkansas in the second round. They received an at-large bid to the NCAA tournament as the No. 9 seed in the Midwest Region, where they defeated Iowa in the First round before falling to Houston in the Second round.

== Previous season ==
The 2021–22 Auburn Tigers men's basketball team finished the 2021–22 season 28–6, 15–3 in SEC play to finish as regular season champions. As the No. 1 seed, they were defeated by No. 8 seed Texas A&M in the quarterfinals. They received an at-large bid to the NCAA tournament as the No. 2 seed in the Midwest Region, where they defeated Jacksonville State in the First round before being upset by Miami in the Second round.

On January 24, 2022, the team was voted first in the AP poll for the first time in program history, in the midst of a nineteen game winning streak.

== Offseason ==
=== Departures ===
Name	Number	Pos.	Height	Weight	Year	Hometown	Reason for departure
Jabari Smith Jr.	10	F	6'10"	220	Freshman	Fayetteville, GA	Declare for 2022 NBA draft; selected 3rd overall by the Houston Rockets.
Walker Kessler	13	C	7'1"	245	Sophomore	Newnan, GA	Declare for 2022 NBA draft; selected 22nd overall by the Memphis Grizzlies.
Preston Cook	14	G	6'4"	205	Senior	Auburn, GA	Graduate transferred from Drury
Ty Cressman	21	F	6'7"	244	Junior	Greensboro, NC	Walk-on; left the team for personal reasons
Michael Whitemore	31	G	5'10"	160	Sophomore	Dunwoody, GA	Walk-on; transferred
Chase Maasdorp	33	G	6'0"	175	RS Junior	Lakewood Ranch, FL	Walk-on; left the team for personal reasons
Devan Cambridge	35	G	6'6"	215	Junior	Nashville, TN	Transferred to Arizona State

=== Incoming transfers ===
Name	Number	Pos.	Height	Weight	Year	Hometown	Previous School
Johni Broome	4	F	6'10"	235	Sophomore	Plant City, FL	Morehead State
Jalen Harper	55	G	6'1"		RS Junior	Mableton, GA	Shelton State CC

=== 2022 recruiting class ===
College recruiting information
Name	Hometown	School	Height	Weight	Commit date
Yohan Traore #3 C	Glendale, AZ	Dream City Christian	6 ft 9 in (2.06 m)	220 lb (100 kg)	Mar 31, 2022
Yohan Traore #3 C	Recruit ratings: Rivals: 247Sports: ESPN: (89)				
Chance Westry #7 PG	Phoenix, AZ	AZ Compass Prep	6 ft 5 in (1.96 m)	215 lb (98 kg)	Oct 31, 2021
Chance Westry #7 PG	Recruit ratings: Rivals: 247Sports: ESPN: (88)				
Tre Donaldson #43 PG	Tallahassee, FL	Florida State University School	6 ft 2 in (1.88 m)	190 lb (86 kg)	Aug 19, 2021
Tre Donaldson #43 PG	Recruit ratings: Rivals: 247Sports: ESPN: (81)				
Overall recruit ranking: Rivals: 40 247Sports: 71 ESPN: 9
Note: In many cases, Scout, Rivals, 247Sports, On3, and ESPN may conflict in their listings of height and weight.; In these cases, the average was taken. ESPN grades are on a 100-point scale.; Sources: "Auburn 2022 Basketball Commitments". Rivals.; "2022 Auburn Tigers Recruiting Class". ESPN.; "2022 Team Ranking". Rivals.

=== 2023 recruiting class ===
College recruiting information (2023)
Name	Hometown	School	Height	Weight	Commit date
Aden Holloway #4 PG	Charlotte, NC	Prolific Prep	6 ft 1 in (1.85 m)	165 lb (75 kg)	Aug 1, 2022
Aden Holloway #4 PG	Recruit ratings: Rivals: 247Sports: ESPN: (90)				
Overall recruit ranking: Rivals: 40 247Sports: 71 ESPN: 9
Note: In many cases, Scout, Rivals, 247Sports, On3, and ESPN may conflict in their listings of height and weight.; In these cases, the average was taken. ESPN grades are on a 100-point scale.; Sources: "Auburn 2023 Basketball Commitments". Rivals.; "2023 Auburn Tigers Recruiting Class". ESPN.; "2023 Team Ranking". Rivals.

== Roster ==
2022–23 Auburn Tigers men's basketball team
Players
Coaches

Pos.	#	Name	Height	Weight	Year	Previous school	Hometown
G	0	K. D. Johnson	6 ft 0 in (1.83 m)	185 lb (84 kg)	Jr	Hargrave Military/Georgia	Atlanta, GA
G	1	Wendell Green Jr.	5 ft 10 in (1.78 m)	175 lb (79 kg)	Jr	La Lumiere School/Eastern Kentucky	Detroit, MI
F	2	Jaylin Williams	6 ft 8 in (2.03 m)	230 lb (104 kg)	Sr	Brantley County	Nahunta, GA
G	3	Tre Donaldson	6 ft 0 in (1.83 m)	190 lb (86 kg)	Fr	Florida State University School	Tallahassee, FL
F	4	Johni Broome	6 ft 10 in (2.08 m)	235 lb (107 kg)	So	Tampa Catholic/Morehead State	Plant City, FL
F	5	Chris Moore	6 ft 6 in (1.98 m)	240 lb (109 kg)	Jr	West Memphis	West Memphis, AR
G	10	Chance Westry	6 ft 6 in (1.98 m)	190 lb (86 kg)	Fr	AZ Compass Prep School (AZ)	Harrisburg, PA
G	12	Zep Jasper	6 ft 1 in (1.85 m)	190 lb (86 kg)	RS Sr	Laney High School/College of Charleston	Augusta, GA
G	14	Presley Patterson (W)	5 ft 11 in (1.8 m)	175 lb (79 kg)	Fr	Knoxville Catholic	Knoxville, TN
G	20	Carter Sobera (W)	6 ft 5 in (1.96 m)	200 lb (91 kg)	Jr	Mountain Brook	Birmingham, AL
F	21	Yohan Traore	6 ft 10 in (2.08 m)	225 lb (102 kg)	Fr	Dream City Christian School (AZ)	Tours, France
G	22	Allen Flanigan	6 ft 6 in (1.98 m)	220 lb (100 kg)	Sr	Parkview Magnet	Little Rock, AR
C	23	Babatunde Akingbola	6 ft 10 in (2.08 m)	245 lb (111 kg)	Sr	McEachern	Ogun, Nigeria
G	24	Lior Berman (W)	6 ft 4 in (1.93 m)	215 lb (98 kg)	Sr	Mountain Brook	Birmingham, AL
G	25	Chandler Leopard (W)	6 ft 3 in (1.91 m)	195 lb (88 kg)	Sr	Athens	Athens, AL
C	42	Haston Alexander (W)	6 ft 10 in (2.08 m)	230 lb (104 kg)	Fr	Covenant Christian School	Tuscumbia, AL
C	44	Dylan Cardwell	6 ft 11 in (2.11 m)	256 lb (116 kg)	Jr	McEachern	Augusta, GA
G	55	Jalen Harper (W)	5 ft 11 in (1.8 m)	175 lb (79 kg)	RS Jr	Pebblebrook/Shelton State CC	Mableton, GA

Head coach

- Bruce Pearl (Boston College)

Assistant coach(es)

- Ira Bowman (Penn)
- Wes Flanigan (Auburn)
- Steven Pearl (Tennessee)

Legend

- (C) Team captain
- (S) Suspended
- (I) Ineligible
- (W) Walk-on
- Injured
- Current redshirt

Roster

== Schedule ==
Date time, TV	Rank^{#}	Opponent^{#}	Result	Record	High points	High rebounds	High assists	Site (attendance) city, state
Exhibition
November 2, 2022*; 7:00 pm	No. 15	Alabama–Huntsville	W 87–69	–	16 – Williams	7 – Donaldson	4 – Flanigan	Neville Arena (7,843); Auburn, AL
Regular season
November 7, 2022*; 7:00 pm, SECN+/ESPN+	No. 15	George Mason	W 70–52	1–0	16 – Green Jr.	9 – Cardwell	4 – Green Jr.	Neville Arena (9,121); Auburn, AL
November 11, 2022*; 7:00 pm, SECN+/ESPN+	No. 15	South Florida	W 67–59	2–0	20 – Green Jr.	8 – Tied	4 – Green Jr.	Neville Arena (9,121); Auburn, AL
November 15, 2022*; 6:00 pm, SECN	No. 13	Winthrop; Cancún Challenge campus site game	W 89–65	3–0	18 – Broome	13 – Broome	5 – Green Jr.	Neville Arena (9,121); Auburn, AL
November 18, 2022*; 7:00 pm, SECN+/ESPN+	No. 13	Texas Southern	W 72–56	4–0	16 – Johnson	8 – Williams	4 – Williams	Neville Arena (9,121); Auburn, AL
November 22, 2022*; 5:00 pm, CBSSN	No. 13	vs. Bradley; Cancún Challenge Riviera semifinal	W 85–64	5–0	14 – Tied	9 – Broome	6 – Green Jr.	Hard Rock Hotel Riviera Maya (951); Cancún, Mexico
November 23, 2022*; 7:30 pm, CBSSN	No. 13	vs. Northwestern; Cancún Challenge Riviera championship	W 43–42	6–0	12 – Johnson	10 – Green Jr.	3 – Green Jr.	Hard Rock Hotel Riviera Maya (1,156); Cancún, Mexico
November 27, 2022*; 2:00 pm, SECN	No. 13	Saint Louis	W 65–60	7–0	22 – Green Jr.	10 – Flanigan	2 – Tied	Neville Arena (9,121); Auburn, AL
December 2, 2022*; 7:00 pm, SECN+/ESPN+	No. 15	Colgate	W 93–66	8–0	16 – Johnson	9 – Broome	4 – Green Jr.	Neville Arena (9,121); Auburn, AL
December 10, 2022*; 4:00 pm, ESPN2	No. 11	vs. Memphis; Holiday Hoopsgiving	L 73–82	8–1	14 – Tied	6 – Broome	5 – Green Jr.	State Farm Arena (7,795); Atlanta, GA
December 14, 2022*; 7:00 pm, SECN+/ESPN+	No. 19	Georgia State	W 72–64	9–1	20 – Williams	8 – Williams	3 – Tied	Neville Arena (9,121); Auburn, AL
December 18, 2022*; 4:30 pm, ESPN	No. 19	at USC	L 71–74	9–2	16 – Broome	8 – Broome	5 – Flanigan	Galen Center (4,517); Los Angeles, CA
December 21, 2022*; 8:00 pm, P12N	No. 23	at Washington	W 84–61	10–2	18 – Tied	8 – Tied	7 – Donaldson	Alaska Airlines Arena (8,502); Seattle, WA
December 28, 2022; 6:00 pm, ESPN2	No. 20	Florida	W 61–58	11–2 (1–0)	14 – Tied	11 – Broome	4 – Broome	Neville Arena (9,121); Auburn, AL
January 4, 2023; 5:30 pm, SECN	No. 22	at Georgia	L 64–76	11–3 (1–1)	22 – Broome	12 – Broome	4 – Williams	Stegeman Coliseum (10,232); Athens, GA
January 7, 2023; 7:30 pm, SECN	No. 22	No. 13 Arkansas	W 72–59	12–3 (2–1)	19 – Green Jr.	10 – Broome	5 – Green Jr.	Neville Arena (9,121); Auburn, AL
January 10, 2023; 8:00 pm, ESPNU	No. 21	at Ole Miss	W 82–73	13–3 (3–1)	23 – Green Jr.	11 – Broome	7 – Green Jr.	SJB Pavilion (5,973); Oxford, MS
January 14, 2023; 7:30 pm, SECN	No. 21	Mississippi State	W 69–63	14–3 (4–1)	21 – Williams	7 – Tied	3 – Tied	Neville Arena (9,121); Auburn, AL
January 18, 2023; 6:00 pm, ESPN2	No. 16	at LSU	W 67–49	15–3 (5–1)	14 – Tied	7 – Tied	4 – Green Jr.	Pete Maravich Assembly Center (9,967); Baton Rouge, LA
January 21, 2023; 2:30 pm, SECN	No. 16	at South Carolina	W 81–66	16–3 (6–1)	27 – Broome	11 – Broome	12 – Green Jr.	Colonial Life Arena (13,048); Columbia, SC
January 25, 2023; 8:00 pm, ESPN2	No. 15	Texas A&M	L 63–79	16–4 (6–2)	16 – Tied	7 – Broome	7 – Williams	Neville Arena (9,121); Auburn, AL
January 28, 2023*; 11:00 am, ESPN	No. 15	at West Virginia; Big 12/SEC Challenge	L 77–80	16–5	18 – Williams	7 – Broome	5 – Tied	WVU Coliseum (14,116); Morgantown, WV
February 1, 2023; 6:00 pm, SECN	No. 25	Georgia	W 94–73	17–5 (7–2)	22 – Flanigan	18 – Broome	6 – Green Jr.	Neville Arena (9,121); Auburn, AL
February 4, 2023; 1:00 pm, ESPN	No. 25	at No. 2 Tennessee	L 43–46	17–6 (7–3)	11 – Broome	9 – Tied	3 – Green Jr.	Thompson–Boling Arena (21,678); Knoxville, TN
February 7, 2023; 6:00 pm, ESPN2		at Texas A&M	L 78–83	17–7 (7–4)	20 – Green Jr.	10 – Broome	6 – Green Jr.	Reed Arena (10,248); College Station, TX
February 11, 2023; 1:00 pm, ESPN		No. 3 Alabama; Rivalry/College GameDay	L 69–77	17–8 (7–5)	24 – Green Jr.	9 – Broome	3 – Johnson	Neville Arena (9,121); Auburn, AL
February 14, 2023; 6:00 pm, ESPN2		Missouri	W 89–56	18–8 (8–5)	20 – Broome	10 – Tied	9 – Green Jr.	Neville Arena (9,121); Auburn, AL
February 18, 2023; 7:30 pm, SECN		at Vanderbilt	L 65–67	18–9 (8–6)	20 – Broome	8 – Green Jr.	2 – Tied	Memorial Gymnasium (14,030); Nashville, TN
February 22, 2023; 8:00 pm, SECN		Ole Miss	W 78–74	19–9 (9–6)	23 – Green Jr.	8 – Broome	5 – Flanigan	Neville Arena (9,121); Auburn, AL
February 25, 2023; 3:00 pm, CBS		at Kentucky	L 54–86	19–10 (9–7)	13 – Williams	5 – Cardwell	2 – Green Jr.	Rupp Arena (20,353); Lexington, KY
March 1, 2023; 6:00 pm, ESPN2		at No. 2 Alabama; Rivalry	L 85–90 ^{OT}	19–11 (9–8)	21 – Johnson	8 – Flanigan	4 – Broome	Coleman Coliseum (13,474); Tuscaloosa, AL
March 4, 2023; 1:00 pm, ESPN		No. 12 Tennessee	W 79–70	20–11 (10–8)	24 – Green Jr.	8 – Williams	7 – Williams	Neville Arena (9,121); Auburn, AL
SEC Tournament
March 9, 2023; 6:00 pm, SECN	(7)	vs. (10) Arkansas; Second round	L 73–76	20–12	20 – Johnson	7 – Broome	4 – Green Jr.	Bridgestone Arena; Nashville, TN
NCAA Tournament
March 16, 2023*; 5:50 pm, TNT	(9 MW)	vs. (8 MW) Iowa; First round	W 83–75	21–12	19 – Broome	12 – Broome	4 – Flanigan	Legacy Arena (15,154); Birmingham, AL
March 18, 2023*; 6:10 pm, TBS	(9 MW)	vs. (1 MW) No. 2 Houston; Second round	L 64–81	21–13	14 – Tied	9 – Flanigan	4 – Green Jr.	Legacy Arena (15,198); Birmingham, AL
*Non-conference game. ^{#}Rankings from AP Poll. (#) Tournament seedings in parentheses. MW=Midwest. All times are in Central Time.

== Statistics ==
Record	AUB	OPP
Scoring	2474	2302
Scoring Average	72.8	67.7
Field goals - Att	875–1991	788–1935
Field goal %	.439	.407
3-point field goals - Att	221–701	192–667
3-point %	.315	.288
Free throws - Att	503–723	534–752
Free throw %	.696	.710
Rebounds	1231	1211
Assists	479	380
Turnovers	414	442
Steals	263	238
Blocked Shots	172	118

=== Team Highs ===
Team Game Highs
Stat	High	Opponent	Date
Points	94	Georgia Bulldogs	February 1, 2023
Field goals made	37	Colgate Raiders	December 2, 2022
Field Goal Attempts	73	Winthrop Eagles	November 15, 2022
3 Points Made	12	Alabama Crimson Tide	March 1, 2023
3 Points Attempted	28	Georgia Bulldogs	January 4, 2023
Free throws made	22	Alabama Crimson Tide; Ole Miss Rebels	February 11, 2023; February 22, 2023
Free Throw Attempts	36	Houston Cougars	March 18, 2023
Rebounds	53	Winthrop Eagles	November 15, 2022
Assists	22	Washington Huskies; Georgia Bulldogs	December 21, 2022; February 1, 2023
Steals	14	George Mason Patriots; Texas Southern Tigers	November 7, 2022; November 18, 2022
Blocked Shots	11	Winthrop Eagles; Saint Louis Billikens; Georgia State Panthers	November 15, 2022; November 27, 2022; December 14, 2022
Turnovers	23	USC Trojans	December 18, 2022
Fouls	29	Alabama Crimson Tide	March 1, 2023

=== Individual Highs ===
Individual Game Highs
Stat	High	Opponent	Date
Points	27 – Johni Broome	South Carolina Gamecocks	January 21, 2023
Field goals made	12 – Johni Broome	South Carolina Gamecocks	January 21, 2023
Field Goal Attempts	19 – Wendell Green Jr.	Alabama Crimson Tide	February 11, 2023
3 Points Made	5 – Jaylin Williams	Mississippi State Bulldogs	January 14, 2023
3 Points Attempted	9 – K. D. Johnson; Wendell Green Jr.	George Mason Patriots; Tennessee Volunteers/Alabama Crimson Tide	November 7, 2022; February 4, 2023/February 11, 2023
Free throws made	11 – Wendell Green Jr.	Georgia State Panthers; Ole Miss Rebels	December 14, 2022; January 10, 2023/February 22, 2023
Free Throw Attempts	16 – Johni Broome	Houston Cougars	March 18, 2023
Rebounds	18 – Johni Broome	Georgia Bulldogs	February 1, 2023
Assists	12 – Wendell Green Jr.	South Carolina Gamecocks	January 21, 2023
Steals	4 – K. D. Johnson; Jaylin Williams; Johni Broome; Tre Donaldson; Wendell Green Jr.	George Mason Patriots; Texas Southern Tigers; Colgate Raiders; USC Trojans; Mississippi State Bulldogs/Tennessee Volunteers	November 7, 2022; November 18, 2022; December 2, 2022; December 18, 2022; January 14, 2023/February 4, 2023
Blocked Shots	8 – Johni Broome	Saint Louis Billikens	November 27, 2022
Turnovers	7 – Allen Flanigan	Mississippi State Bulldogs	January 14, 2023
Fouls	5 – Wendell Green Jr. Tre Donaldson; Zep Jasper; Jaylin Williams; Allen Flanigan; Johni Broome	Memphis Tigers; USC Trojans; Georgia Bulldogs/Tennessee Volunteers; Mississippi State Bulldogs/Alabama Crimson Tide; LSU Tigers/Alabama Crimson Tide; West Virginia Mountaineers/Texas A&M Aggies/Alabama Crimson Tide	December 10, 2022; December 18, 2022; January 4, 2023/March 4, 2023; January 14, 2023/March 1, 2023; January 18, 2023/March 1, 2023; January 28, 2023/February 7, 2023/March 1, 2023

== Rankings ==
Ranking movements Legend: ██ Increase in ranking ██ Decrease in ranking RV = Received votes т = Tied with team above or below
	Week																			
Poll	Pre	1	2	3	4	5	6	7	8	9	10	11	12	13	14	15	16	17	18	Final
AP	15	13	13	15	11	19	23	20	22	21	16	15	25	RV	RV	RV				Not released
Coaches	15	15	16	19	14	18	24	23	20	22	17	16	23т	RV	RV					

== See also ==
- 2022–23 Auburn Tigers women's basketball team
