= Yohan Traoré =

French basketball player (born 2003)

Yohan Traore
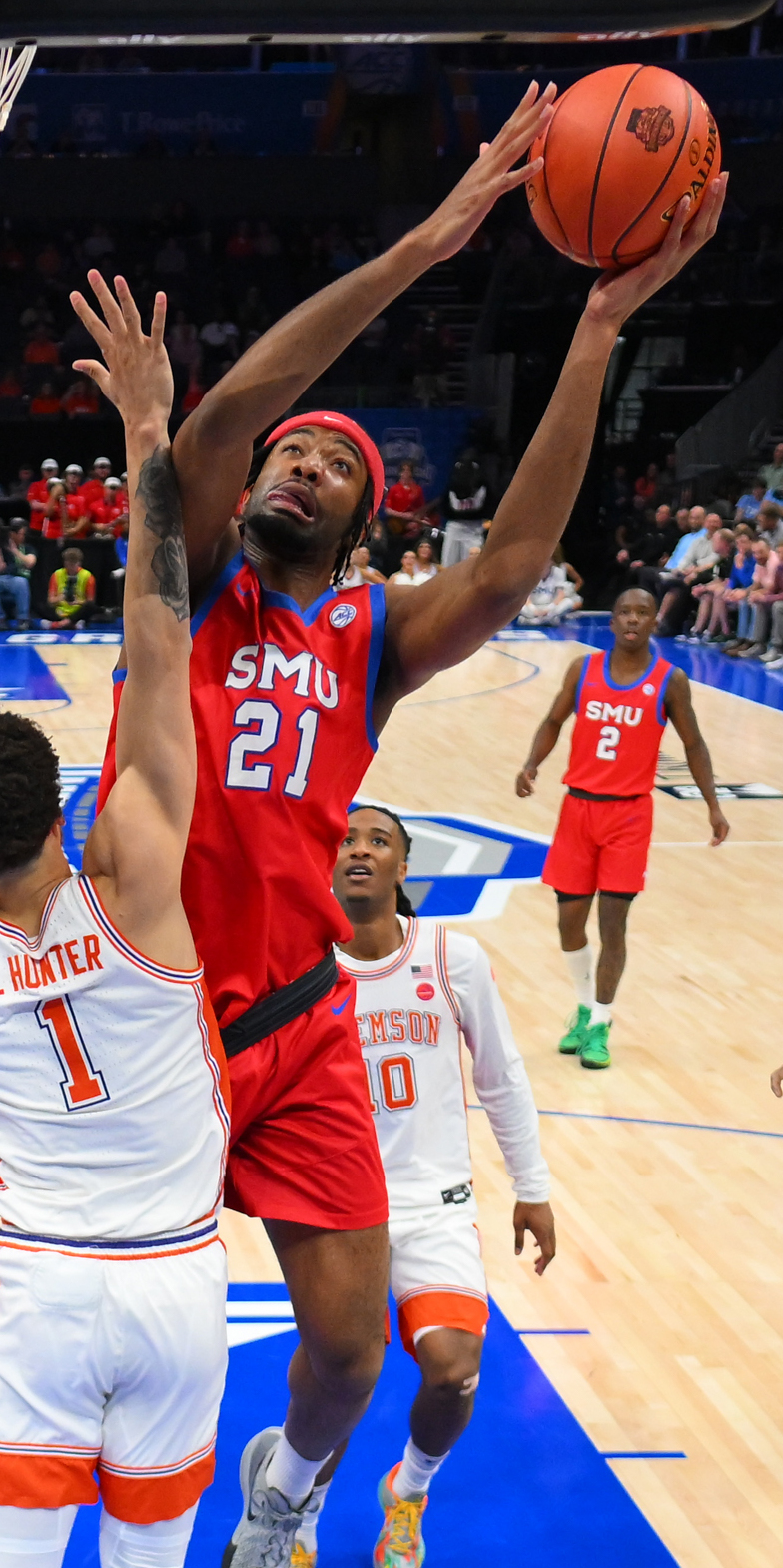

Personal information
- Born: February 15, 2003 (age 23) Tours, France
- Listed height: 6 ft 11 in (2.11 m)
- Listed weight: 235 lb (107 kg)

Career information
- High school: Prolific Prep (Napa, California); Dream City Christian (Glendale, Arizona)
- College: Auburn (2022–2023); UC Santa Barbara (2023–2024); SMU (2024–2025); Butler (2025–2026)
- Position: Power forward / center

Career highlights
- Nike Hoop Summit (2022)

Yohan Toti Traoré (born February 15, 2003) is a French college basketball player in the NCAA transfer portal. He previously played for the SMU Mustangs, UC Santa Barbara Gauchos, Auburn Tigers and Butler Bulldogs.

== Early life and high school career ==
Yohan Toti Traoré was born on February 15, 2003, in Tours, France, to an Ivorian mother, Mah-bana. He is the oldest of five children.

Traore relocated to America at 17 to pursue basketball. He originally starred for Prolific Prep of Napa Christian School in Napa, California. He would then attend Dream City Christian School as a senior. He received an invitation to participate in the Nike Hoop Summit, scoring four points for the World Select Team.

=== Recruiting ===
Traore was considered the top ranked player in Arizona and one of the top players in the class of 2022 by major recruiting sources. On January 30, 2022, Traore committed to play college basketball for LSU. Following the controversy and subsequent firing of head coach Will Wade, Traore reopened his commitment on March 22, 2022. On March 31, 2022, Traore announced his commitment to play college basketball for Auburn over offers from Gonzaga, Kansas, and Houston. He is one of the highest ranked recruits in program history.

College recruiting
| Name | Hometown | School | Height | Weight | Commit date |
|---|---|---|---|---|---|
| Yohan Traore; C | Glendale, AZ | Dream City Christian (AZ) | 6 ft 9 in (2.06 m) | 220 lb (100 kg) | Mar 31, 2022 |
| Yohan Traore; C | Recruit ratings: Rivals: 247Sports: ESPN: (89) | | | | |
Overall recruit ranking: Rivals: 19 247Sports: 26 ESPN: 27
Note: In many cases, Scout, Rivals, 247Sports, On3, and ESPN may conflict in their listings of height and weight.; In these cases, the average was taken. ESPN grades are on a 100-point scale.; Sources: "Auburn 2022 Basketball Commitments". Rivals.; "2022 Auburn Tigers Recruiting Class". ESPN.; "2022 Team Ranking". Rivals.

== College statistics ==
| Year | Team | GP | GS | MPG | FG% | 3P% | FT% | RPG | APG | SPG | BPG | PPG |
|---|---|---|---|---|---|---|---|---|---|---|---|---|
| 2022–23 | Auburn | 25 | 0 | 9.9 | .400 | .192 | .348 | 1.4 | .2 | – | .1 | 2.1 |
| 2023–24 | UC Santa Barbara | 30 | 30 | 28.8 | .583 | .000 | .686 | 5.1 | .4 | .2 | .4 | 14.5 |
| 2024–25 | SMU | 32 | 16 | 15.6 | .504 | .324 | .679 | 3.2 | .4 | .2 | .2 | 6.1 |
| 2025–26 | Butler | 32 | 0 | 19.5 | .547 | .200 | .709 | 3.0 | .8 | .3 | .3 | 8.3 |
| Career | | 119 | 46 | 18.8 | .542 | .232 | .670 | 3.3 | .5 | .2 | .2 | 8.0 |
