= Allen Flanigan =

American basketball player

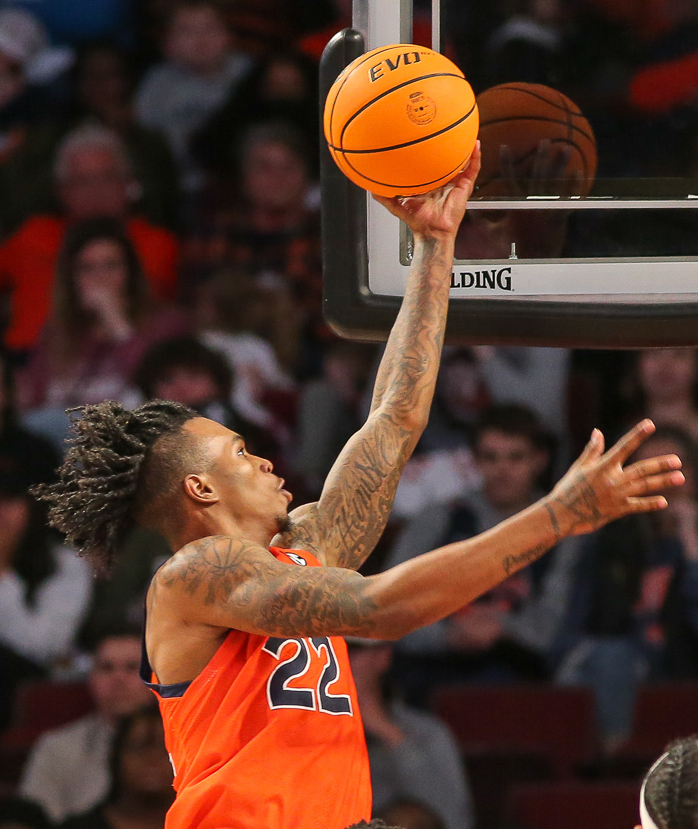
- Flanigan in 2023

Free agent
- Position: Small forward

Personal information
- Born: April 24, 2001 (age 25)
- Listed height: 6 ft 6 in (1.98 m)
- Listed weight: 215 lb (98 kg)

Career information
- High school: Parkview (Little Rock, Arkansas)
- College: Auburn (2019–2023); Ole Miss (2023–2024)
- NBA draft: 2024: undrafted
- Playing career: 2024–present

Allen Flanigan (born April 24, 2001) is an American professional basketball player. He played college basketball player for the Ole Miss Rebels and Auburn Tigers of the Southeastern Conference (SEC).

== High school career ==
Flanigan played basketball for Parkview Arts and Science Magnet High School in Little Rock, Arkansas under the coaching of his grandfather, Al, and won two state championships. He committed to playing college basketball for Auburn, joining his father, Wes, an assistant coach and former player with the program.

== College career ==
As a freshman at Auburn, Flanigan came off the bench and averaged 3.2 points per game. On January 23, 2021, he recorded a sophomore season-high 24 points, six rebounds and four assists in a 109–86 win over South Carolina. As a sophomore, Flanigan averaged 14.3 points, 5.5 rebounds and 2.9 assists per game. On September 7, 2021, it was announced that Flanigan would miss 12 to 14 weeks due to undergoing a surgical procedure on his right Achilles tendon. He averaged 6.3 points, 3.5 rebounds, and 1.3 assists per game as a junior. Flanigan averaged 10.1 points, five rebounds and 1.5 assists as a senior. He transferred to Ole Miss for his postgraduate season. Flanigan averaged 14.8 points, 6.1 rebounds, 2.8 assists and 1.5 steals per game.

== Professional career ==
After going undrafted in the 2024 NBA draft, Flanigan joined the Golden State Warriors for NBA Summer League.

On July 26, 2024, he signed with Stade Rochelais Basket of the Pro A. He got injured in September 2024, needing to be out for three months. On January 15, 2025, he parted ways with the team.

== Career statistics ==
Legend
GP	Games played	GS	Games started	MPG	Minutes per game
FG%	Field goal percentage	3P%	3-point field goal percentage	FT%	Free throw percentage
RPG	Rebounds per game	APG	Assists per game	SPG	Steals per game
BPG	Blocks per game	PPG	Points per game	**Bold**	Career high

=== College ===
Year	Team	GP	GS	MPG	FG%	3P%	FT%	RPG	APG	SPG	BPG	PPG
2019–20	Auburn	31	3	13.8	.394	.143	.459	2.7	.4	.3	.1	3.2
2020–21	Auburn	27	27	30.4	**.455**	**.338**	.776	5.5	**2.9**	.9	**.2**	14.3
2021–22	Auburn	22	20	24.5	.395	.205	.647	3.5	1.3	.6	.1	6.3
2022–23	Auburn	**34**	19	27.0	.442	.333	.758	5.0	1.5	.8	.2	10.1
2023–24	Ole Miss	32	**29**	**30.7**	.434	.273	**.817**	**6.1**	2.8	**1.5**	**.7**	**14.8**
Career		146	98	25.3	.433	.294	.748	4.6	1.8	.8	.3	9.9
