= 2023–24 Ole Miss Rebels men's basketball team =

American college basketball season

2023–24 Ole Miss Rebels men's basketball
- Conference: Southeastern Conference
- Record: 20–12 (7–11 SEC)
- Head coach: Chris Beard (1st season)
- Assistant coaches: Bob Donewald Jr. (1st season); Wes Flanigan (1st season); Al Pinkins (1st, 4th overall season); Brian Burg (1st season); Win Case (6th season)
- Home arena: SJB Pavilion

2023–24 Southeastern Conference men's basketball standings
	Conf.				Overall
Team	W		L	PCT	W		L	PCT
No. 5 Tennessee	14	–	4	.778	27	–	9	.750
No. 20 Kentucky	13	–	5	.722	23	–	10	.697
No. 3т Alabama	13	–	5	.722	25	–	12	.676
No. 18 Auburn †	13	–	5	.722	27	–	8	.771
No. 25 South Carolina	13	–	5	.722	26	–	8	.765
Florida	11	–	7	.611	24	–	12	.667
Texas A&M	9	–	9	.500	21	–	15	.583
LSU	9	–	9	.500	17	–	16	.515
Mississippi State	8	–	10	.444	21	–	14	.600
Ole Miss	7	–	11	.389	20	–	12	.625
Georgia	6	–	12	.333	20	–	17	.541
Arkansas	6	–	12	.333	16	–	17	.485
Vanderbilt	4	–	14	.222	9	–	23	.281
Missouri	0	–	18	.000	8	–	24	.250
† 2024 SEC tournament winner Rankings from AP poll

The 2023–24 Ole Miss Rebels men's basketball team represented the University of Mississippi during the 2023–24 NCAA Division I men's basketball season. The Rebels were led by first-year head coach Chris Beard. The Rebels played their home games at The Sandy and John Black Pavilion at Ole Miss in University, Mississippi, just outside Oxford, as members of the Southeastern Conference. The team posted their first 20-win season in five years but did not participate in any postseason tournaments, failing to qualify for the NCAA Tournament and subsequently declining an invitation to compete in the National Invitation Tournament.

== Previous season ==
The Rebels finished the 2022–23 season 12–21, 3–15 in SEC play to finish in 13th place. They lost in the second round of the SEC tournament to Tennessee after defeating South Carolina in the first round. Head coach Kermit Davis was fired with five games remaining on the schedule after a 74–79 record in five seasons at Ole Miss. Win Case served as interim for the remaining five games.

Former Texas head coach Chris Beard was hired on March 13, 2023. Beard was placed on leave by Texas following his December 12, 2022 arrest for assault against a family member by strangulation after an alleged altercation with his fiancée. He was fired on January 5, 2023. Charges were dropped on February 15 by the district attorney, due to case evidence and the wishes of his fiancée not to prosecute.

== Offseason ==
=== Departures ===
Ole Miss departures
Name	Number	Pos.	Height	Weight	Year	Hometown	Reason for departure	Ref.
Jayveous McKinnis	00	F	6'7"	225	Senior	Brandon, MS	Graduated	
Amaree Abram	1	G	6'4"	190	Freshman	Port Arthur, TX	Transferred to Georgia Tech	
Myles Burns	3	F	6'6"	210	Senior	Houston, TX	Graduated	
James White	5	G	6'5"	190	Sophomore	Conyers, GA	Transferred to UAB	
Theo Akwuba	10	F	6'11"	225	Senior	Montgomery, AL	Graduated	
Malique Ewin	12	F	6'10"	220	Freshman	Lawrenceville, GA	Transferred to South Plains College	
Tye Fagan	14	G	6'3"	198	Senior	Logtown, GA	Graduated	
Robert Allen	21	F	6'8"	230	Senior	Orlando, FL	Transferred to North Texas	
Daeshun Ruffin	24	G	5'9"	160	Sophomore	Jackson, MS	Transferred to Jackson State	
Josh Mballa	33	F	6'7"	220	Senior	Bordeaux, France	Graduated	

=== Incoming transfers ===
Incoming transfers
Name	Number	Pos.	Height	Weight	Year	Hometown	Previous school	Ref.
Brandon Murray	0	G	6'5"	225	Junior	Germantown, MD	Georgetown	
Austin Nunez	1	G	6'2"	170	Sophomore	Garden Ridge, TX	Arizona State	
Jamarion Sharp	3	C	7'5"	235	Senior	Hopkinsville, KY	Western Kentucky	
Jaylen Murray	5	G	5'11"	175	Junior	Bronx, NY	Saint Peter's	
Allen Flanigan	7	G	6'6"	220	Senior	Little Rock, AR	Auburn	
Moussa Cissé	33	F	7'1"	216	Senior	Conakry, Guinea	Oklahoma State	

=== 2023 recruiting class ===
College recruiting
Name	Hometown	School	Height	Weight	Commit date
Rashaud Marshall; C	Blytheville, AR	Blytheville High School	6 ft 9 in (2.06 m)	215 lb (98 kg)	May 1, 2023
Rashaud Marshall; C	Recruit ratings: Rivals: 247Sports: ESPN: (82)				
Cameron Barnes; PF	Duncanville, TX	Duncanville High School	6 ft 10 in (2.08 m)	210 lb (95 kg)	May 1, 2023
Cameron Barnes; PF	Recruit ratings: Rivals: 247Sports: ESPN: (79)				
Jacob Gazzo; PF	McComb, MS	Parklane Academy	6 ft 8 in (2.03 m)	200 lb (91 kg)	Mar 31, 2021
Jacob Gazzo; PF	Recruit ratings: Rivals: ESPN: (77)				
Overall recruit ranking:
Note: In many cases, Scout, Rivals, 247Sports, On3, and ESPN may conflict in their listings of height and weight.; In these cases, the average was taken. ESPN grades are on a 100-point scale.; Sources: "Ole Miss 2023 Basketball Commitments". Rivals.; "2023 Team Ranking". Rivals.

== Roster ==
2023–24 Ole Miss Rebels men's basketball team
Players
Coaches

Pos.	#	Name	Height	Weight	Year	Previous school	Hometown
G	0	Brandon Murray	6 ft 5 in (1.96 m)	225 lb (102 kg)	Jr	IMG Academy; Georgetown	Germantown, MD
G	1	Austin Nunez	6 ft 2 in (1.88 m)	170 lb (77 kg)	So	Wagner HS; Arizona State	Garden Ridge, TX
G	2	TJ Caldwell	6 ft 4 in (1.93 m)	190 lb (86 kg)	So	Faith Family Academy	Dallas, TX
C	3	Jamarion Sharp	7 ft 5 in (2.26 m)	235 lb (107 kg)	Sr	Hopkinsville HS; Western Kentucky	Hopkinsville, KY
F	4	Jaemyn Brakefield	6 ft 8 in (2.03 m)	220 lb (100 kg)	Sr	Huntington Prep School; Duke	Jackson, MS
G	5	Jaylen Murray	5 ft 11 in (1.8 m)	175 lb (79 kg)	Jr	Putnam Science Academy; Saint Peter's	The Bronx, NY
G	7	Allen Flanigan	6 ft 6 in (1.98 m)	220 lb (100 kg)	Sr	Parkview Magnet HS; Auburn	Little Rock, AR
G	11	Matthew Murrell	6 ft 4 in (1.93 m)	200 lb (91 kg)	Sr	IMG Academy	Memphis, TN
G	13	Robert Cowherd	6 ft 5 in (1.96 m)	195 lb (88 kg)	So	Southern California Academy	Grayson, GA
F	23	Cameron Barnes	6 ft 10 in (2.08 m)	210 lb (95 kg)	Fr	Duncanville HS	Duncanville, TX
F	24	Jacob Gazzo	6 ft 8 in (2.03 m)	200 lb (91 kg)	Fr	Parklane Academy	McComb, MS
F	25	Rashaud Marshall	6 ft 9 in (2.06 m)	215 lb (98 kg)	Fr	Blytheville HS	Blytheville, AR
G	30	Cole McGrath (W)	6 ft 3 in (1.91 m)	175 lb (79 kg)	Sr	Booneville HS; Blue Mountain	Corinth, MS
F	33	Moussa Cissé	7 ft 1 in (2.16 m)	216 lb (98 kg)	Sr	Lausanne Collegiate School; Oklahoma State	Conakry, Guinea
G	55	Cam Brent (W)	5 ft 5 in (1.65 m)	130 lb (59 kg)	Fr	Jackson Prep	Jackson, MS

Head coach

- Chris Beard (Texas)

Assistant coach(es)

- Bob Donewald Jr. (Western Michigan)
- Wes Flanigan (Auburn)
- Al Pinkins (NC State)
- Brian Burg (Mount Mercy)
- Win Case (USAO)

Legend

- (C) Team captain
- (S) Suspended
- (I) Ineligible
- (W) Walk-on
- Injured
- Current redshirt

Roster

== Schedule and results ==
Date time, TV	Rank^{#}	Opponent^{#}	Result	Record	High points	High rebounds	High assists	Site (attendance) city, state
Exhibition
October 30, 2023*; 7:00 p.m.		Tusculum	W 85–44		–	–	–	SJB Pavilion; Oxford, MS
Non-conference regular season
November 6, 2023*; 7:00 p.m., SECN+/ESPN+		Alabama State	W 69–59	1–0	16 – Murrell	12 – Flanigan	4 – J. Murray	SJB Pavilion (6,141); Oxford, MS
November 10, 2023*; 7:00 p.m., SECN+/ESPN+		Eastern Washington	W 75–64	2–0	29 – Flanigan	5 – Flanigan	4 – Caldwell	SJB Pavilion (6,665); Oxford, MS
November 14, 2023*; 7:00 p.m., SECN+/ESPN+		Detroit Mercy	W 70–69	3–0	22 – J. Murray	10 – Sharp	7 – J. Murray	SJB Pavilion (6,331); Oxford, MS
November 17, 2023*; 8:00 p.m., SECN+/ESPN+		Sam Houston; Rob Evans Tad Pad game	W 70–67	4–0	23 – Flanigan	7 – Flanigan	4 – J. Murray	Tad Smith Coliseum (4,445); Oxford, MS
November 22, 2023*; 2:30 p.m., ESPN+		at Temple	W 77–76	5–0	26 – Flanigan	8 – Flanigan	7 – Flanigan	Liacouras Center (2,334); Philadelphia, PA
November 28, 2023*; 8:00 p.m., ESPN2		NC State; ACC–SEC Challenge	W 72–52	6–0	25 – Brakefield	10 – Flanigan	4 – J. Murray	SJB Pavilion (7,465); Oxford, MS
December 2, 2023*; 1:00 p.m., ESPN2		Memphis	W 80–77	7–0	22 – J. Murray	6 – Tied	9 – J. Murray	SJB Pavilion (9,416); Oxford, MS
December 5, 2023*; 7:00 p.m., SECN+/ESPN+		Mount St. Mary's	W 77–68	8–0	26 – J. Murray	13 – Brakefield	6 – J. Murray	SJB Pavilion (6,950); Oxford, MS
December 10, 2023*; 3:00 p.m., ESPN+		at UCF	W 70–68	9–0	18 – Flanigan	7 – Tied	4 – Nunez	Addition Financial Arena (6,067); Orlando, FL
December 16, 2023*; 6:30 p.m., SECN		vs. California; Hall of Fame Series San Antonio	W 88–78	10–0	27 – Brakefield	8 – Flanigan	6 – Flanigan	Frost Bank Center (2,279); San Antonio, TX
December 19, 2023*; 6:00 p.m., SECN+/ESPN+	No. 25	Troy	W 74–53	11–0	18 – Murrell	7 – Tied	9 – Flanigan	SJB Pavilion (7,981); Oxford, MS
December 23, 2023*; 1:00 p.m.	No. 25	vs. Southern Miss	W 89–72	12–0	26 – Murrell	11 – Flanigan	5 – Murrell	Mississippi Coast Coliseum; Biloxi, MS
December 31, 2023*; 3:00 p.m., SECN	No. 24	Bryant	W 95–78	13–0	20 – Flanigan	10 – Sharp	4 – Tied	SJB Pavilion (7,934); Oxford, MS
SEC regular season
January 6, 2024; 5:00 p.m., SECN	No. 22	at No. 5 Tennessee	L 64–90	13–1 (0–1)	22 – Brakefield	8 – J. Murray	4 – Flanigan	Thompson–Boling Arena (21,932); Knoxville, TN
January 10, 2024; 8:00 p.m., SECN		Florida	W 103–85	14–1 (1–1)	28 – Brakefield	6 – Cisse	8 – J. Murray	SJB Pavilion (7,570); Oxford, MS
January 13, 2024; 12:00 p.m., SECN		Vanderbilt	W 69–56	15–1 (2–1)	24 – Murrell	8 – Sharp	8 – Flanigan	SJB Pavilion (8,404); Oxford, MS
January 17, 2024; 6:00 p.m., SECN	No. 22	at LSU	L 80–89	15–2 (2–2)	23 – J. Murray	9 – Brakefield	3 – Brakefield	Pete Maravich Assembly Center (8,777); Baton Rouge, LA
January 20, 2024; 7:30 p.m., SECN	No. 22	at No. 13 Auburn	L 59–82	15–3 (2–3)	10 – Flanigan	8 – Sharp	3 – J. Murray	Neville Arena (9,121); Auburn, AL
January 24, 2024; 8:00 p.m., ESPNU		Arkansas	W 77–51	16–3 (3–3)	21 – J. Murray	11 – Flanigan	3 – J. Murray	SJB Pavilion (8,207); Oxford, MS
January 27, 2024; 7:30 p.m., SECN		at Texas A&M	W 71–68	17–3 (4–3)	16 – J. Murray	8 – B. Murray	5 – J. Murray	Reed Arena (12,610); College Station, TX
January 30, 2024; 7:30 p.m., SECN		Mississippi State	W 86–82	18–3 (5–3)	21 – J. Murray	5 – Cisse	11 – J. Murray	SJB Pavilion (10,630); Oxford, MS
February 3, 2024; 5:00 p.m., SECN		No. 16 Auburn	L 77–91	18–4 (5–4)	20 – Flanigan	6 – B. Murray	6 – J. Murray	SJB Pavilion (9,631); Oxford, MS
February 6, 2024; 5:30 p.m., SECN		at No. 15 South Carolina	L 65–68	18–5 (5–5)	26 – Flanigan	9 – Murrell	5 – B. Murray	Colonial Life Arena (18,000); Columbia, SC
February 13, 2024; 8:00 p.m., ESPN		at No. 22 Kentucky	L 63–75	18–6 (5–6)	16 – Tied	6 – Murrell	6 – Flanigan	Rupp Arena (20,064); Lexington, KY
February 17, 2024; 7:30 p.m., SECN		Missouri	W 79–76	19–6 (6–6)	26 – Murrell	10 – Flanigan	5 – Brakefield	SJB Pavilion (8,598); Oxford, MS
February 21, 2024; 8:00 p.m., ESPN2		at Mississippi State	L 71–83	19–7 (6–7)	23 – Murrell	10 – Sharp	5 – J. Murray	Humphrey Coliseum (9,381); Starkville, MS
February 24, 2024; 2:30 p.m., SECN		No. 20 South Carolina	L 59–72	19–8 (6–8)	13 – Cisse	7 – Brakefield	6 – J. Murray	SJB Pavilion (8,486); Oxford, MS
February 28, 2024; 8:00 p.m., ESPN2		No. 14 Alabama	L 88–103	19–9 (6–9)	28 – Flanigan	6 – Flanigan	7 – J. Murray	SJB Pavilion (7,722); Oxford, MS
March 2, 2024; 7:30 p.m., SECN		at Missouri	W 84–78	20–9 (7–9)	21 – Murrell	7 – Sharp	3 – Murrell	Mizzou Arena (11,021); Columbia, MO
March 5, 2024; 6:00 p.m., SECN		at Georgia	L 66–69	20–10 (7–10)	19 – J. Murray	6 – J. Murray	3 – J. Murray	Stegeman Coliseum (6,219); Athens, GA
March 9, 2024; 1:00 p.m., CBS		Texas A&M	L 60–86	20–11 (7–11)	21 – J. Murray	4 – Brakefield	3 – J. Murray	SJB Pavilion (7,819); Oxford, MS
SEC tournament
March 14, 2024; 6:00 p.m., SECN	(10)	vs. (7) Texas A&M; Second round	L 71–80	20–12	23 – Brakefield	7 – Tied	5 – Tied	Bridgestone Arena (13,771); Nashville, TN
*Non-conference game. ^{#}Rankings from AP Poll. (#) Tournament seedings in parentheses. All times are in Central Time.

== Rankings ==
Ranking movements Legend: ██ Increase in ranking ██ Decrease in ranking — = Not ranked RV = Received votes т = Tied with team above or below
	Week																				
Poll	Pre	1	2	3	4	5	6	7	8	9	10	11	12	13	14	15	16	17	18	19	Final
AP	—	—	—	—	RV	RV	25	24	22	RV	22	RV	RV	RV	RV	—	—	—	—	—	
Coaches	—	—	—	—	RV	25	25	22	19	23т	21	RV	RV	RV	—	—	—	—	—	—	

== See also ==
- 2023–24 Ole Miss Rebels women's basketball team
