= Blue Cain =

American basketball player (born 2004)

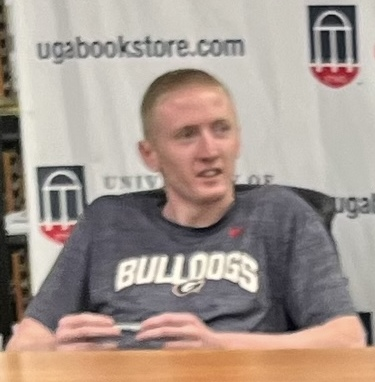
- Cain in 2024

No. 0 – Georgia Bulldogs
- Position: Shooting guard
- League: Southeastern Conference

Personal information
- Born: September 25, 2004 (age 22) Knoxville, Tennessee, U.S.
- Listed height: 6 ft 5 in (1.96 m)
- Listed weight: 195 lb (88 kg)

Career information
- High school: Knoxville Catholic (Knoxville, Tennessee); IMG Academy (Bradenton, Florida)
- College: Georgia (2023–present)

Christopher Blue Cain (born September 25, 2004) is an American college basketball player for the Georgia Bulldogs of the Southeastern Conference (SEC).

== Early life and high school ==
Christopher Blue Cain was born on September 25, 2004. Growing up, his hometown was Knoxville, Tennessee, where he first attended Knoxville Catholic High School. At Knoxville Catholic, Cain played basketball from his freshman to his junior year.

As a freshman, Cain averaged 7.6 points, 3.0 rebounds, 2.9 assists, and 1.8 steals, which helped Knoxville Catholic obtain a 25–4 record and win the Tennessee Division II-AA state championship. Cain's statistics in all four categories increased as a sophomore, with him averaging 15.7 points, 5.4 rebounds, 3.5 assists, and 2.0 steals, although Knoxville Catholic posted a 21–4 record and was eliminated in the semifinals of the state tournament. In his junior year, Cain averaged the most points he would in a year at Knoxville Catholic with 19.7 and led them to a career-best 28–4 record, finishing as the runner-up in the state tournament. In total, Cain compiled 1213 points, 400 rebounds, 253 assists, and 191 steals and led Knoxville Catholic High School to a 74–12 record over three years.

Before his senior year, Cain transferred to play basketball at IMG Academy in Bradenton, Florida. In his lone year at IMG Academy, Cain averaged 12.9 points, 3.6 rebounds, 2.3 assists, and 1.5 steals. In the quarterfinals of the GEICO National Tournament, Cain hit a spinning half-court buzzer-beater to win the game over Prolific Prep. IMG Academy finished with an 18–8 record and made it to the semifinals of the GEICO National Tournament, and was also ranked number 9 in ESPN's SCNext national boys’ basketball rankings.

=== Recruiting ===
In high school, Cain was rated as a four-star recruit. He was ranked No. 53 by ESPN, No. 69 by 247Sports Composite and No. 94 by Rivals. Cain originally chose to sign with Georgia Tech under coach Josh Pastner. However, Pastner was fired before the 2023–24 season and replaced by Damon Stoudamire, causing Cain to de-commit from Georgia Tech. Instead, Cain signed with in-state rival Georgia under coach Mike White over teams such as South Carolina, Syracuse, Tennessee, Penn State, and Virginia. Cain cited his relationship with the coaching staff at Georgia as the primary factor for committing there, saying, "It just felt like home."

College recruiting
Name	Hometown	School	Height	Weight	Commit date
Blue Cain #10 SG	Knoxville, TN	IMG Academy	6 ft 5 in (1.96 m)	194 lb (88 kg)	May 3, 2023
Blue Cain #10 SG	Recruit ratings: Rivals: 247Sports: ESPN: (85)				
Overall recruit ranking: Rivals: 94 247Sports: 69 ESPN: 53
Note: In many cases, Scout, Rivals, 247Sports, On3, and ESPN may conflict in their listings of height and weight.; In these cases, the average was taken. ESPN grades are on a 100-point scale.; Sources: "Georgia 2023 Basketball Commitments". Rivals.; "2023 Georgia Bulldogs Recruiting Class". ESPN.; "2023 Team Ranking". Rivals.

== College career ==
Cain came into Georgia as the highest-rated freshman recruit for the Bulldogs since Anthony Edwards during the 2019–20 season. In his college debut, Cain scored 12 points with 2 rebounds and 3 assists against Oregon. As a freshman, Cain recorded games with 18 points against Miami and Alabama A&M. On March 13, Cain scored a career-high 19 points in a win against Missouri in the first round of the 2024 SEC men's basketball tournament. Cain started 9 out of his 37 games played, averaging 7.4 points, 2.5 rebounds, and 0.8 assists.

== Personal life ==
Cain is the son of Chris and Myriah Cain. Chris played golf at Duke, from where he decided to give his son the middle name Blue after Duke's blue colors. Myriah played women's basketball at George Washington and is in the school's Athletic Hall of Fame. Cain's sister Sophie played volleyball for Appalachian State.

== Career statistics ==
Legend
GP	Games played	GS	Games started	MPG	Minutes per game
FG%	Field goal percentage	3P%	3-point field goal percentage	FT%	Free throw percentage
RPG	Rebounds per game	APG	Assists per game	SPG	Steals per game
BPG	Blocks per game	PPG	Points per game	**Bold**	Career high

=== College ===
Year	Team	GP	GS	MPG	FG%	3P%	FT%	RPG	APG	SPG	BPG	PPG
2023–24	Georgia	**37**	9	20.8	.404	**.350**	.667	2.5	.8	.8	**.2**	7.4
2024–25	Georgia	33	**33**	27.0	.415	.341	.841	4.2	1.5	**1.4**	.1	9.6
2025–26	Georgia	33	**33**	**27.8**	**.468**	.300	**.907**	**5.1**	**2.6**	**1.4**	**.2**	**13.1**
Career		103	75	25.0	.432	.329	.846	3.9	1.6	1.2	.1	9.9
