= Noah Thomasson =

American basketball player (born 2001)

No. 2 – Hamburg Towers
- Position: Point guard
- League: Basketball Bundesliga

Personal information
- Born: June 4, 2001 (age 25) Houston, Texas, U.S.
- Listed height: 6 ft 4 in (1.93 m)
- Listed weight: 210 lb (95 kg)

Career information
- High school: George Ranch (Fort Bend County, Texas)
- College: Houston Christian (2019–2020); Butler CC (2020–2021); Niagara (2021–2023); Georgia (2023–2024)
- NBA draft: 2024: undrafted
- Playing career: 2024–present

Career history
- 2024–2025: Mornar Bar
- 2025–2026: Twarde Pierniki Toruń
- 2026–present: Hamburg Towers

Career highlights
- First-team All-MAAC (2023)

Noah Micah Thomasson (born June 4, 2001) is an American professional basketball player for the Hamburg Towers of the German Basketball Bundesliga (BBL). He played college basketball for the Houston Christian Huskies, Butler Grizzlies, Niagara Purple Eagles, and Georgia Bulldogs.

== Early life and high school ==
Thomasson was born on June 4, 2001, in Houston, Texas. He attended George Ranch High School in Richmond, Texas, inside the Greater Houston metropolitan area, and played basketball there.

Thomasson began to start for George Ranch in his junior year. That year, Thomasson averaged 10.2 points, 4.6 rebounds, and 3.1 assists. Thomasson's production increased his senior year, scoring 20 points or more in half the games he played in, helping George Ranch go 26–7 and reach the Elite Eight round of the Texas 6A state tournament. At the end of the season, Thomasson averaged 19.9 points, 4.7 rebounds, and 3.6 assists and was named the most valuable player in his Texas 6A district and all-state for Texas 6A. In total, Thomasson compiled 976 points, 306 rebounds, and 219 assists for George Ranch.

== College career ==
=== Houston Christian ===
==== 2019–20 season ====
Thomasson first committed to Houston Christian to play basketball. Thomasson made his college debut against Tulsa, but only played 3 minutes and did not record any statistics. On January 5, Thomasson scored the most points he would while at Houston Christian with 17 in a loss to Northwestern State. Overall, Thomasson averaged 4.0 points, 1.1 rebounds, and 0.4 assists in his lone season at Houston Christian.

=== Butler Community College ===
==== 2020–21 season ====
Thomasson transferred to play basketball for Butler Community College before the beginning of the 2020–21 season. While at Butler, Thomasson's production increased, averaging 15.0 points, 4.3 rebounds, and 4.7 assists at the end of the season. Additionally, he was named second-team All-KJCCC.

=== Niagara ===
==== 2021–22 season ====
After his lone season at Butler, Thomasson again transferred to play basketball at Niagara. In his debut for Niagara, Thomasson scored 11 points with 1 rebound against Xavier. On January 9, Thomasson recorded his first 20-point game, scoring 21 in a win over Quinnipiac. Thomasson set a new career high in points on March 5 with 27 in a win over Marist. Overall, Thomasson averaged 10.8 points, 2.8 rebounds, and 3.4 assists, with his average in assists being the highest on the team that season.

==== 2022–23 season ====
Thomasson was named a starter before the beginning of the season for Niagara. On November 11, Thomasson set a new career-high in points with 29 in a win over Central Arkansas. Thomasson was named MAAC player of the week after that game. Additionally, following that game, Thomasson would only score in single-digits once for the rest of the season, scoring above 20 points in 16 of those remaining games. On March 4, Thomasson recorded his first 30-point game, scoring 35 points in a loss against Canisius. At the end of the season, Thomasson averaged 19.5 points, 3.8 rebounds, and 3.5 assists. Thomasson was also unanimously named first-team All-MAAC.

=== Georgia ===
==== 2023–24 season ====
Following two years at Niagara, Thomasson opted to transfer to Georgia to play basketball there. In his debut for Georgia, Thomasson scored 6 points with 2 rebounds and 3 assists in a loss against Oregon. Thomasson fared better the next game, scoring 21 points in a win against Wake Forest. On November 24, Thomasson scored 24 points in a win against Winthrop. On February 7, Thomasson scored 20 points in a loss against Mississippi State. Thomasson scored a season-high 26 points on February 17 in a loss against Florida. On March 26, Thomasson scored 21 points in a win against Ohio State in the quarterfinals of the 2024 NIT. Thomasson started all 37 of his games played and averaged a team-high 13.1 points along with 2.8 rebounds and 1.6 assists.

== Professional career ==
On August 8, 2024, he signed with Yukatel Merkezefendi of the Basketbol Süper Ligi (BSL). On October 31, 2024, he signed with KK Mornar Bar that competes in the ABA league. Thomasson averaged 10.0 points, 2.0 rebounds, and 3.6 assists in 23 games.

On August 6, 2025, he signed with Twarde Pierniki Toruń of the Polish Basketball League (PLK).

== Personal life ==
Thomasson is the son of Leon Thomasson and Tracye Sweet. Leon played cornerback for the Atlanta Falcons.

== Career statistics ==
Legend
GP	Games played	GS	Games started	MPG	Minutes per game
FG%	Field goal percentage	3P%	3-point field goal percentage	FT%	Free throw percentage
RPG	Rebounds per game	APG	Assists per game	SPG	Steals per game
BPG	Blocks per game	PPG	Points per game	**Bold**	Career high

=== College ===
Year	Team	GP	GS	MPG	FG%	3P%	FT%	RPG	APG	SPG	BPG	PPG
2019–20	Houston Christian	24	0	10.2	**.507**	**.438**	.778	1.1	.4	.4	.0	4.0
2020–21	Butler CC	23	23	31.9	.487	.320	**.795**	**4.3**	**4.7**	**.7**	**.4**	15.0
2021–22	Niagara	30	29	33.1	.454	.361	.683	2.8	3.4	.2	**.5**	10.8
2022–23	Niagara	31	31	**36.4**	.481	.386	.667	3.8	3.5	**.7**	.4	**19.5**
2023–24	Georgia	**37**	**37**	28.4	.409	.345	.598	2.8	1.6	**.7**	.1	13.1
Career		145	120	30.0	.470	.342	.728	3.5	3.5	.7	.3	13.7
