= 2023–24 LSU Tigers men's basketball team =

American college basketball season

2023–24 LSU Tigers men's basketball

NIT, First Round
- Conference: Southeastern Conference
- Record: 17–16 (9–9 SEC)
- Head coach: Matt McMahon (2nd season)
- Assistant coaches: Casey Long; Ronnie Hamilton; Tim Kaine; Ronrico White
- Home arena: Pete Maravich Assembly Center

2023–24 Southeastern Conference men's basketball standings
	Conf.				Overall
Team	W		L	PCT	W		L	PCT
No. 5 Tennessee	14	–	4	.778	27	–	9	.750
No. 20 Kentucky	13	–	5	.722	23	–	10	.697
No. 3т Alabama	13	–	5	.722	25	–	12	.676
No. 18 Auburn †	13	–	5	.722	27	–	8	.771
No. 25 South Carolina	13	–	5	.722	26	–	8	.765
Florida	11	–	7	.611	24	–	12	.667
Texas A&M	9	–	9	.500	21	–	15	.583
LSU	9	–	9	.500	17	–	16	.515
Mississippi State	8	–	10	.444	21	–	14	.600
Ole Miss	7	–	11	.389	20	–	12	.625
Georgia	6	–	12	.333	20	–	17	.541
Arkansas	6	–	12	.333	16	–	17	.485
Vanderbilt	4	–	14	.222	9	–	23	.281
Missouri	0	–	18	.000	8	–	24	.250
† 2024 SEC tournament winner Rankings from AP poll

The 2023–24 LSU Tigers men's basketball team represented Louisiana State University during the 2023–24 NCAA Division I men's basketball season. The team's head coach was Matt McMahon, in his second season at LSU. The Tigers played their home games at Pete Maravich Assembly Center in Baton Rouge, Louisiana as a member of the Southeastern Conference.

== Previous season ==
The Tigers finished the season 13–18, 2–16 in SEC Play to finish in last place, despite starting the season with an impressive 12–1 run. As the 14th seed in the SEC tournament, the Tigers defeated Georgia in the first round before falling to Vanderbilt in the second round. LSU did not participate in any postseason play.

== Offseason ==
=== Departures ===
Name	Number	Pos.	Height	Weight	Year	Hometown	Reason for departure
Cam Hayes	1	G	6'3"	180	Junior	Greensboro, NC	Transferred to East Carolina
Corneilous Williams	2	F	6'9"	210	Freshman	Meridian, MS	Transferred to Western Carolina
Justice Hill	3	G	6'0"	175	Junior	Little Rock, AR	Transferred to Loyola Marymount
Kendal Coleman	4	C	6'8"	230	Sophomore	Shreveport, LA	Transferred to California Baptist
Brandon Egemo	10	G	6'1"	175	Junior	Los Angeles, CA	Walk-on; TBD
Justice Williams	11	G	6'4"	175	Sophomore	Philadelphia, PA	Transferred to Robert Morris
KJ Williams	12	F	6'10"	250	Senior	Cleveland, MS	Graduated/went undrafted in 2023 NBA draft; signed by the Oklahoma City Thunder
Austin Montgomery	21	G	6'4"	180	Freshman	New Orleans, LA	Walk-on; transferred
Parker Edwards	30	G	6'2"	220	RS Senior	Covington, LA	Walk-on; graduated
Shawn Phillips	34	C	7'0"	245	Freshman	Dayton, OH	Transferred to Arizona State
Adam Miller	44	G	6'3"	190	RS Sophomore	Peoria, IL	Transferred to Arizona State

=== Incoming transfers ===
Name	Number	Pos.	Height	Weight	Year	Hometown	Previous School
Carlos Stewart	1	G	6'1"	185	Junior	Baton Rouge, LA	Santa Clara
Jalen Cook	3	G	6'0"	205	Junior	Walker, LA	Tulane
Jordan Wright	4	G/F	6'6"	220	GS Senior	Baton Rouge, LA	Vanderbilt
Daimion Collins	10	F	6'9"	210	Junior	Atlanta, TX	Kentucky
Hunter Dean	12	F	6'10"	235	GS Senior	Mandeville, LA	George Washington
Trace Young	13	G	6'0"	180	RS Junior	Austin, TX	Walk-on; Colorado State
Will Baker	32	C	7'0"	245	RS Senior	Austin, TX	Nevada

=== 2023 Recruiting class ===
College recruiting information
Name	Hometown	School	Height	Weight	Commit date
Corey Chest #27 PF	New Orleans, LA	Link Academy	6 ft 8 in (2.03 m)	210 lb (95 kg)	Aug 16, 2022
Corey Chest #27 PF	Recruit ratings: Scout: Rivals: 247Sports: ESPN: (82)				
Mike Williams III #38 PG	Cumberland, MD	Bishop Walsh High School	6 ft 3 in (1.91 m)	195 lb (88 kg)	Nov 6, 2022
Mike Williams III #38 PG	Recruit ratings: Scout: Rivals: 247Sports: ESPN: (80)				
Overall recruit ranking:
Note: In many cases, Scout, Rivals, 247Sports, On3, and ESPN may conflict in their listings of height and weight.; In these cases, the average was taken. ESPN grades are on a 100-point scale.; Sources: "LSU 2023 Basketball Commitments". Rivals.; "2023 LSU Basketball Commits". Scout.; "ESPN". ESPN.; "Scout.com Team Recruiting Rankings". Scout.; "2023 Team Ranking". Rivals.

== Roster ==
2023–24 LSU Tigers men's basketball team
Players
Coaches

Pos.	#	Name	Height	Weight	Year	Previous school	Hometown
G	0	Trae Hannibal	6 ft 2 in (1.88 m)	221 lb (100 kg)	Sr	Murray State	Elliott, SC
G	1	Carlos Stewart	6 ft 1 in (1.85 m)	193 lb (88 kg)	Jr	Santa Clara	Baton Rouge, LA
G	2	Mike Williams III	6 ft 3 in (1.91 m)	181 lb (82 kg)	Fr	Bishop Walsh HS	Baltimore, MD
G	3	Jalen Cook	6 ft 0 in (1.83 m)	194 lb (88 kg)	Jr	Tulane	Walker, LA
G	6	Jordan Wright	6 ft 6 in (1.98 m)	230 lb (104 kg)	GS	Vanderbilt	Baton Rouge, LA
F	5	Mwani Wilkinson	6 ft 5 in (1.96 m)	205 lb (93 kg)	Jr	Bishop Gorman HS	Las Vegas, NV
F	10	Daimion Collins	6 ft 9 in (2.06 m)	191 lb (87 kg)	Jr	Kentucky	Atlanta, TX
F	11	Corey Chest	6 ft 8 in (2.03 m)	210 lb (95 kg)	Fr	Link Academy (MO)	New Orleans, LA
F	12	Hunter Dean	6 ft 10 in (2.08 m)	250 lb (113 kg)	GS	George Washington	Mandeville, LA
F	13	Jalen Reed	6 ft 10 in (2.08 m)	230 lb (104 kg)	Fr	Southern California Academy	Jackson, MS
G	14	Trace Young (W)	6 ft 3 in (1.91 m)	181 lb (82 kg)	RS Jr	Colorado State	Austin, TX
F	15	Tyrell Ward	6 ft 6 in (1.98 m)	185 lb (84 kg)	Fr	DeMatha Catholic HS	Washington, D.C.
F	20	Derek Fountain	6 ft 9 in (2.06 m)	225 lb (102 kg)	Jr	Mississippi State	Holly Springs, MS
F	25	Adam Benhayoune (W)	6 ft 5 in (1.96 m)	225 lb (102 kg)	So	Sandra Day O'Connor HS	Helotes, TX
F	9	Will Baker	7 ft 0 in (2.13 m)	245 lb (111 kg)	RS Sr	Nevada	Austin, TX

Head coach

- Matt McMahon (Appalachian State)

Assistant coach(es)

- Casey Long (Chattanooga)
- Ronnie Hamilton (UNC Pembroke)

Legend

- (C) Team captain
- (S) Suspended
- (I) Ineligible
- (W) Walk-on
- Injured
- Current redshirt

Roster

== Schedule and results ==
Date time, TV	Rank^{#}	Opponent^{#}	Result	Record	High points	High rebounds	High assists	Site (attendance) city, state
Exhibition
October 30, 2023*; 7:00 p.m., SECN+/ESPN+		Louisiana Christian	W 132–44	–	22 – Wright	9 – Chest	8 – Stewart	Pete Maravich Assembly Center (1,092); Baton Rouge, LA
Non-conference regular season
November 6, 2023*; 7:00 p.m., SECN+/ESPN+		Mississippi Valley State	W 106–60	1–0	29 – Baker	6 – Tied	5 – Hannibal	Pete Maravich Assembly Center (7,922); Baton Rouge, LA
November 10, 2023*; 7:00 p.m., SECN+/ESPN+		Nicholls	L 66–68	1–1	14 – Reed	8 – Reed	3 – Hannibal	Pete Maravich Assembly Center (7,265); Baton Rouge, LA
November 16, 2023*; 3:00 p.m., ESPN2		vs. Dayton; Charleston Classic quarterfinals	L 67–70	1–2	16 – Reed	8 – Baker	3 – Wrights	TD Arena (3,879); Charleston, SC
November 17, 2023*; 10:30 a.m., ESPNU		vs. North Texas; Charleston Classic consolation 2nd round	W 66–62	2–2	16 – Baker	6 – Tied	3 – Williams III	TD Arena (–); Charleston, SC
November 19, 2023*; 2:00 p.m., ESPN2		vs. Wake Forest; Charleston Classic 5th Place Game	W 86–80 ^{OT}	3–2	23 – Baker	9 – Wright	3 – Ward	TD Arena (2,753); Charleston, SC
November 24, 2023*; 7:00 p.m., SECN+/ESPN+		North Florida	W 75–63	4–2	18 – Baker	9 – Reed	5 – Reed	Pete Maravich Assembly Center (7,940); Baton Rouge, LA
November 28, 2023*; 6:00 p.m., ESPN2		at Syracuse; ACC–SEC Challenge	L 57–80	4–3	15 – Wright	11 – Reed	3 – Hannibal	JMA Wireless Dome (19,602); Syracuse, NY
December 1, 2023*; 7:00 p.m., SECN+/ESPN+		Southeastern Louisiana	W 73–66	5–3	18 – Baker	7 – Baker	4 – Williams III	Pete Maravich Assembly Center (7,365); Baton Rouge, LA
December 9, 2023*; 12:30 p.m., SECN		Kansas State	L 60–75	5–4	19 – Wright	6 – Fountain	3 – Tied	Pete Maravich Assembly Center (7,413); Baton Rouge, LA
December 13, 2023*; 7:00 p.m., SECN+/ESPN+		Alabama State	W 74–56	6–4	15 – Williams III	7 – Reed	6 – Wright	Pete Maravich Assembly Center (7,104); Baton Rouge, LA
December 16, 2023*; 11:00 a.m., ESPN2		vs. No. 19 Texas; The Halal Guys Showcase	L 85–96	6–5	33 – Wright	5 – Dean	6 – Cook	Toyota Center (12,152); Houston, TX
December 21, 2023*; 8:00 p.m., SECN		Lamar	W 87–66	7–5	17 – Cook	8 – Baker	5 – Cook	Pete Maravich Assembly Center (7,388); Baton Rouge, LA
December 29, 2023*; 7:00 p.m., SECN+/ESPN+		Northwestern State	W 96–55	8–5	20 – Williams III	10 – Tied	8 – Hannibal	Pete Maravich Assembly Center (8,256); Baton Rouge, LA
SEC regular season
January 6, 2024; 7:30 p.m., SECN		at Texas A&M	W 68–53	9–5 (1–0)	20 – Wright	10 – Wright	3 – Cook	Reed Arena (10,525); College Station, TX
January 9, 2024; 8:00 p.m., SECN		Vanderbilt	W 77–69	10–5 (2–0)	28 – Cook	8 – Williams III	3 – Hannibal	Pete Maravich Assembly Center (7,218); Baton Rouge, LA
January 13, 2024; 5:00 p.m., SECN		at No. 16 Auburn	L 78–93	10–6 (2–1)	18 – Tied	10 – Baker	3 – Tied	Neville Arena (9,121); Auburn, AL
January 17, 2024; 6:00 p.m., SECN		No. 22 Ole Miss	W 89–80	11–6 (3–1)	27 – Wright	8 – Tied	5 – Wright	Pete Maravich Assembly Center (8,777); Baton Rouge, LA
January 20, 2024; 3:00 p.m., ESPNU		Texas A&M	L 69–73	11–7 (3–2)	15 – Wright	10 – Wright	6 – Wright	Pete Maravich Assembly Center (9,085); Baton Rouge, LA
January 24, 2024; 5:30 p.m., SECN		at Georgia	L 66–68	11–8 (3–3)	21 – Cook	6 – Baker	3 – Cook	Stegeman Coliseum (9,243); Athens, GA
January 27, 2024; 7:00 p.m., ESPN		at Alabama	L 88–109	11–9 (3–4)	16 – Williams III	6 – Fountain	5 – Wright	Coleman Coliseum (13,474); Tuscaloosa, AL
February 3, 2024; 11:00 a.m., ESPN2		Arkansas	W 95–74	12–9 (4–4)	25 – Baker	7 – Reed	6 – Wright	Pete Maravich Assembly Center (7,880); Baton Rouge, LA
February 7, 2024; 6:00 p.m., SECN		at No. 6 Tennessee	L 68–88	12–10 (4–5)	16 – Baker	11 – Hannibal	4 – Hannibal	Thompson–Boling Arena (21,678); Knoxville, TN
February 10, 2024; 11:00 a.m., ESPN		No. 16 Alabama	L 92–109	12–11 (4–6)	24 – Baker	8 – Cook	6 – Hannibal	Pete Maravich Assembly Center (7,755); Baton Rouge, LA
February 13, 2024; 7:00 p.m., SECN		at Florida	L 80–82	12–12 (4–7)	16 – Tied	6 – Fountain	4 – Hannibal	O'Connell Center (9,007); Gainesville, FL
February 17, 2024; 2:30 p.m., SECN		at No. 11 South Carolina	W 64–63	13–12 (5–7)	16 – Ward	12 – Hannibal	3 – Wright	Colonial Life Arena (16,570); Columbia, SC
February 21, 2024; 8:00 p.m., ESPN		No. 17 Kentucky	W 75–74	14–12 (6–7)	17 – Ward	8 – Hannibal	7 – Hannibal	Pete Maravich Assembly Center (9,493); Baton Rouge, LA
February 24, 2024; 7:30 p.m., SECN		Mississippi State	L 67–87	14–13 (6–8)	22 – Hannibal	6 – Hannibal	2 – Hannibal	Pete Maravich Assembly Center (9,463); Baton Rouge, LA
February 27, 2024; 6:00 p.m., SECN		Georgia	W 67–66	15–13 (7–8)	17 – Wright	8 – Williams III	8 – Hannibal	Pete Maravich Assembly Center (7,621); Baton Rouge, LA
March 2, 2024; 2:30 p.m., SECN		at Vanderbilt	W 75–61	16–13 (8–8)	15 – Wright	7 – Tied	6 – Hannibal	Memorial Gymnasium (6,696); Nashville, TN
March 6, 2024; 6:00 p.m., SECN		at Arkansas	L 83–94	16–14 (8–9)	24 – Wright	10 – Hannibal	4 – Wright	Bud Walton Arena (19,200); Fayetteville, AR
March 9, 2024; 7:30 p.m., SECN		Missouri	W 84–80	17–14 (9–9)	23 – Hannibal	10 – Baker	5 – Hannibal	Pete Maravich Assembly Center (8,547); Baton Rouge, LA
SEC Tournament
March 14, 2024; 12:00 p.m., SECN	(8)	vs. (9) Mississippi State; Second Round	L 60–70	17–15	18 – Hannibal	8 – Wright	4 – Williams III	Bridgestone Arena (11,638); Nashville, TN
NIT
March 19, 2024; 6:00 p.m., SECN	(4)	North Texas; First Round - Seton Hall Bracket	L 77–84	17–16	25 – Wright	9 – Hannibal	4 – Tied	Pete Maravich Assembly Center (2,210); Baton Rouge, LA
*Non-conference game. ^{#}Rankings from AP Poll. (#) Tournament seedings in parentheses. All times are in Central Time.

Schedule Source

== Rankings ==
Ranking movements
	Week																			
Poll	Pre	1	2	3	4	5	6	7	8	9	10	11	12	13	14	15	16	17	18	Final
AP																				
Coaches																				

== See also ==
- 2023–24 LSU Tigers women's basketball team
