= 2023–24 Vanderbilt Commodores men's basketball team =

American college basketball season

2023–24 Vanderbilt Commodores men's basketball
- Conference: Southeastern Conference
- Record: 9–23 (4–14 SEC)
- Head coach: Jerry Stackhouse (5th season)
- Assistant coaches: Andy Fox; Anthony Wilkins; James Strong
- Home arena: Memorial Gymnasium

2023–24 Southeastern Conference men's basketball standings
	Conf.				Overall
Team	W		L	PCT	W		L	PCT
No. 5 Tennessee	14	–	4	.778	27	–	9	.750
No. 20 Kentucky	13	–	5	.722	23	–	10	.697
No. 3т Alabama	13	–	5	.722	25	–	12	.676
No. 18 Auburn †	13	–	5	.722	27	–	8	.771
No. 25 South Carolina	13	–	5	.722	26	–	8	.765
Florida	11	–	7	.611	24	–	12	.667
Texas A&M	9	–	9	.500	21	–	15	.583
LSU	9	–	9	.500	17	–	16	.515
Mississippi State	8	–	10	.444	21	–	14	.600
Ole Miss	7	–	11	.389	20	–	12	.625
Georgia	6	–	12	.333	20	–	17	.541
Arkansas	6	–	12	.333	16	–	17	.485
Vanderbilt	4	–	14	.222	9	–	23	.281
Missouri	0	–	18	.000	8	–	24	.250
† 2024 SEC tournament winner Rankings from AP poll

The 2023–24 Vanderbilt Commodores men's basketball team represented Vanderbilt University during the 2023–24 NCAA Division I men's basketball season. The team was led by fifth-year head coach Jerry Stackhouse, and played their home games at Memorial Gymnasium in Nashville, Tennessee as a member of the Southeastern Conference. They finished the season 9–23, 4–14 in SEC play, to finish in 13th place. They lost in the first round of the SEC tournament to Arkansas.

On March 14, 2024, the school fired head Jerry Stackhouse after five seasons. On March 25, the school named James Madison head coach Mark Byington the team's new head coach.

== Previous season ==
The Commodores finished the 2022–23 season 22–15, 11–7 in SEC play, to finish in a three-way tie for fourth place. They defeated LSU and Kentucky to advance to the semifinals of the SEC tournament where they were defeated by Texas A&M. They received an at-large bid to the National Invitation Tournament where they defeated Yale and Michigan to advance to the quarterfinals before losing to UAB.

== Offseason ==
=== Departures ===
Name	Number	Pos.	Height	Weight	Year	Hometown	Reason for departure
Noah Shelby	2	G	6'3"	180	Freshman	McKinney, TX	Transferred to Rice
Jordan Wright	4	G/F	6'6"	220	Senior	Baton Rouge, LA	Graduated; transferred to LSU
Myles Stute	10	F	6'7"	215	Junior	Washington, D.C.	Transferred to South Carolina
Adrian Samuels	11	G	6'5"	170	Freshman	Nashville, TN	Walk-on; transferred to American
Trey Thomas	12	G	6'0"	160	Junior	Durham, ON	Transferred to Bowling Green
Emmanuel Ansong	20	G	6'4"	195	Senior	Bordentown, NJ	Graduated
Liam Robbins	21	C	7'0"	250	GS Senior	Davenport, IA	Graduated
Malik Dia	23	F	6'9"	240	Freshman	Murfreesboro, TN	Transferred to Belmont
Quentin Millora-Brown	42	F	6'10"	245	RS Senior	Lorton, VA	Graduated; transferred to The Citadel

=== Incoming transfers ===
Name	Number	Pos.	Height	Weight	Year	Hometown	Previous school
Ven-Allen Lubin	2	F	6'8"	226	Sophomore	Orlando, FL	Notre Dame
Jordan Williams	10	G	6'3"	215	Sophomore	Houston, TX	Texas A&M
Evan Taylor	12	G	6'6"	205	GS Senior	Glen Ellyn, IL	Lehigh
Tasos Kamateros	21	F	6'8"	240	Senior	Athens, Greece	South Dakota

=== Recruiting classes ===
==== 2023 recruiting class ====
College recruiting
Name	Hometown	School	Height	Weight	Commit date
Malik Presley #24 SF	San Marcos, TX	San Marcos High School	6 ft 6 in (1.98 m)	195 lb (88 kg)	Apr 21, 2023
Malik Presley #24 SF	Recruit ratings: Rivals: 247Sports: ESPN: (82)				
Isaiah West #31 PG	Nashville, TN	Goodpasture Christian High School	6 ft 2 in (1.88 m)	185 lb (84 kg)	Jun 29, 2022
Isaiah West #31 PG	Recruit ratings: Rivals: 247Sports: ESPN: (82)				
Carter Lang #38 C	Charlottesville, VA	St. Anne's-Belfield School	6 ft 8 in (2.03 m)	245 lb (111 kg)	Sep 12, 2022
Carter Lang #38 C	Recruit ratings: Rivals: 247Sports: ESPN: (80)				
Jason Rivera-Torres #41 SF	New Rochelle, NY	Iona College Prep	6 ft 6 in (1.98 m)	170 lb (77 kg)	Apr 14, 2023
Jason Rivera-Torres #41 SF	Recruit ratings: Rivals: 247Sports: ESPN: (80)				
JaQualon Roberts #35 PF	Bloomington, IN	Bloomington North High School	6 ft 6 in (1.98 m)	205 lb (93 kg)	Aug 4, 2022
JaQualon Roberts #35 PF	Recruit ratings: Rivals: 247Sports: ESPN: (79)				
Overall recruit ranking:
Note: In many cases, Scout, Rivals, 247Sports, On3, and ESPN may conflict in their listings of height and weight.; In these cases, the average was taken. ESPN grades are on a 100-point scale.; Sources: "Vanderbilt 2023 Basketball Commitments". Rivals.; "ESPN". ESPN.; "2023 Team Ranking". Rivals.

==== 2024 recruiting class ====
College recruiting (2024)
Name	Hometown	School	Height	Weight	Commit date
Karris Bilal; SG	Atlanta, GA	Riverwood High School	6 ft 2 in (1.88 m)	180 lb (82 kg)	Oct 1, 2022
Karris Bilal; SG	Recruit ratings: Rivals: 247Sports: ESPN: (NR)				
Tyler Tanner; PG	Brentwood, TN	Brentwood Academy	6 ft 0 in (1.83 m)	150 lb (68 kg)	Jul 14, 2023
Tyler Tanner; PG	Recruit ratings: Rivals: 247Sports: ESPN: (NR)				
Overall recruit ranking:
Note: In many cases, Scout, Rivals, 247Sports, On3, and ESPN may conflict in their listings of height and weight.; In these cases, the average was taken. ESPN grades are on a 100-point scale.; Sources: "Vanderbilt 2024 Basketball Commitments". Rivals.; "ESPN". ESPN.; "2024 Team Ranking". Rivals.

== Preseason polls ==
SEC Basketball Media poll
Predicted finish	Team)
1	Tennessee
2	Texas A&M
3	Arkansas
4	Kentucky
5	Alabama
6	Auburn
7	Mississippi State
8	Florida
9	Missouri
10	Mississippi
11	Vanderbilt
12	Georgia
13	Louisiana State
14	South Carolina

== Roster ==
2023–24 Vanderbilt Commodores men's basketball team
Players
Coaches

Pos.	#	Name	Height	Weight	Year	Previous school	Hometown
G	0	Tyrin Lawrence	6 ft 4 in (1.93 m)	200 lb (91 kg)	Sr	Morgan County HS	Monticello, GA
F	1	Colin Smith	6 ft 8 in (2.03 m)	215 lb (98 kg)	So	Compass Prep (AZ)	Dallas, TX
F	2	Ven-Allen Lubin	6 ft 8 in (2.03 m)	225 lb (102 kg)	So	Notre Dame	Orlando, FL
G	3	Paul Lewis	6 ft 2 in (1.88 m)	170 lb (77 kg)	So	Bishop O'Connell HS	Woodbridge, VA
G	4	Isaiah West	6 ft 2 in (1.88 m)	190 lb (86 kg)	Fr	Goodpasture Christian School	Springfield, TN
G	5	Ezra Manjon	6 ft 0 in (1.83 m)	170 lb (77 kg)	GS	UC Davis	Antioch, CA
G	10	Jordan Williams (W)	6 ft 3 in (1.91 m)	205 lb (93 kg)	RS Fr	Texas A&M	Houston, TX
G	12	Evan Taylor	6 ft 6 in (1.98 m)	205 lb (93 kg)	GS	Lehigh	Glen Ellyn, IL
G/F	13	Malik Presley	6 ft 6 in (1.98 m)	185 lb (84 kg)	Fr	San Marcos HS	San Marcos, TX
G	15	Coleson Messer (W)	6 ft 4 in (1.93 m)	205 lb (93 kg)	Fr	Highland Park HS	Dallas, TX
F	21	Tasos Kamateros	6 ft 8 in (2.03 m)	240 lb (109 kg)	Sr	South Dakota	Athens, Greece
G	22	Graham Calton (W)	6 ft 6 in (1.98 m)	205 lb (93 kg)	Jr	Charlotte Latin School	Charlotte, NC
G/F	23	Jason Rivera-Torres	6 ft 7 in (2.01 m)	190 lb (86 kg)	Fr	John Marshall HS (VA)	The Bronx, NY
F	24	JaQualon Roberts	6 ft 8 in (2.03 m)	210 lb (95 kg)	Fr	Bloomington HS	Bloomington, IN
G	25	Miles Keeffe (W)	6 ft 5 in (1.96 m)	185 lb (84 kg)	So	Southern California Academy	Novato, CA
F	34	Lee Dort	6 ft 10 in (2.08 m)	255 lb (116 kg)	So	Greenhill School	McKinney, TX
F	35	Carter Lang	6 ft 9 in (2.06 m)	245 lb (111 kg)	Fr	St. Anne's-Belfield School	Charlottesville, VA

Head coach

- Jerry Stackhouse (North Carolina)

Assistant coach(es)

- Andy Fox (Tennessee)
- Anthony Wilkins (Kent State)
- James Strong (Vanderbilt)

Legend

- (C) Team captain
- (S) Suspended
- (I) Ineligible
- (W) Walk-on
- Injured
- Current redshirt

Roster
Last update: March 16, 2024

== Schedule and results ==
Date time, TV	Rank^{#}	Opponent^{#}	Result	Record	High points	High rebounds	High assists	Site (attendance) city, state
Non-conference regular season
November 7, 2023*; 7:00 p.m., SECN+/ESPN+		Presbyterian	L 62–68	0–1	19 – Manjon	11 – Lang	3 – Lewis	Memorial Gymnasium (5,506); Nashville, TN
November 10, 2023*; 6:00 p.m., SECN+/ESPN+		USC Upstate	W 74–67	1–1	21 – Kamateros	9 – Smith	7 – Manjon	Memorial Gymnasium (5,346); Nashville, TN
November 14, 2023*; 7:00 p.m., SECN+/ESPN+		UNC Greensboro	W 74–70	2–1	24 – Manjon	11 – Smith	4 – Manjon	Memorial Gymnasium (5,175); Nashville, TN
November 17, 2023*; 6:00 p.m., SECN+/ESPN+		Central Arkansas	W 75–71	3–1	16 – Manjon	11 – Smith	4 – Manjon	Memorial Gymnasium (5,247); Nashville, TN
November 23, 2023*; 9:00 p.m., ESPN2		vs. NC State; Vegas Showdown semifinals	L 78–84	3–2	21 – Lawrence	8 – Lubin	3 – Lewis	Michelob Ultra Arena (–); Paradise, NV
November 24, 2023*; 7:00 p.m., ESPN2		vs. Arizona State; Vegas Showdown 3rd-place game	L 67–82	3–3	25 – Taylor	6 – tied	5 – Lawrence	Michelob Ultra Arena (–); Paradise, NV
November 29, 2023*; 8:15 p.m., SECN		Boston College; ACC–SEC Challenge	L 62–80	3–4	16 – Manjon	6 – Lubin	3 – West	Memorial Gymnasium (5,516); Nashville, TN
December 2, 2023*; 4:00 p.m., SECN+/ESPN+		Alabama A&M	W 78–59	4–4	19 – Lawrence	10 – Lubin	7 – Manjon	Memorial Gymnasium (5,468); Nashville, TN
December 6, 2023*; 7:00 p.m., SECN+/ESPN+		San Francisco	L 60–73	4–5	15 – Lubin	4 – Taylor	3 – Lawrence	Memorial Gymnasium (5,210); Nashville, TN
December 16, 2023*; 6:30 p.m., ESPN+		vs. Texas Tech; USLBM Coast to Coast Challenge	L 54–76	4–6	15 – Lubin	5 – Presley	5 – Manjon	Dickies Arena (7,219); Fort Worth, TX
December 19, 2023*; 6:00 p.m., SECN		Western Carolina	L 62–63	4–7	18 – Manjon	8 – tied	2 – tied	Memorial Gymnasium (5,146); Nashville, TN
December 23, 2023*; 3:00 p.m., CBS		at No. 23 Memphis	L 75–77	4–8	22 – Manjon	6 – tied	4 – tied	FedExForum (13,260); Memphis, TN
December 30, 2023*; 4:00 p.m., SECN+/ESPN+		Dartmouth	W 69–53	5–8	23 – Manjon	8 – Lawrence	5 – Manjon	Memorial Gymnasium (5,773); Nashville, TN
SEC regular season
January 6, 2024; 2:30 p.m., SECN		Alabama	L 75–78	5–9 (0–1)	20 – tied	6 – tied	2 – tied	Memorial Gymnasium (8,703); Nashville, TN
January 9, 2024; 8:00 p.m., SECN		at LSU	L 69–77	5–10 (0–2)	19 – Manjon	6 – tied	3 – Manjon	Pete Maravich Assembly Center (7,218); Baton Rouge, LA
January 13, 2024; 12:00 p.m., SECN		at Ole Miss	L 56–69	5–11 (0–3)	14 – Lawrence	6 – Lawrence	2 – tied	SJB Pavilion (8,404); Oxford, MS
January 17, 2024; 8:00 p.m., SECN		No. 13 Auburn	L 65–80	5–12 (0–4)	15 – Lawrence	6 – Lubin	2 – Lawrence	Memorial Gymnasium (7,099); Nashville, TN
January 20, 2024; 2:30 p.m., SECN		at Mississippi State	L 55–68	5–13 (0–5)	16 – Lawrence	8 – Lubin	5 – Manjon	Humphrey Coliseum (9,172); Starkville, MS
January 27, 2024; 5:00 p.m., SECN		No. 5 Tennessee; Rivalry	L 62–75	5–14 (0–6)	21 – Lawrence	8 – Lawrence	3 – tied	Memorial Gymnasium (13,852); Nashville, TN
January 31, 2024; 8:00 p.m., ESPN2		at No. 16 Auburn	L 54–81	5–15 (0–7)	17 – Lubin	12 – Lubin	4 – Manjon	Neville Arena (9,121); Auburn, AL
February 3, 2024; 2:30 p.m., SECN		Missouri	W 68–61	6–15 (1–7)	17 – Manjon	11 – Taylor	4 – Manjon	Memorial Gymnasium (6,905); Nashville, TN
February 6, 2024; 7:30 p.m., SECN		No. 17 Kentucky	L 77–109	6–16 (1–8)	20 – Taylor	5 – tied	9 – Manjon	Memorial Gymnasium (11,678); Nashville, TN
February 10, 2024; 12:00 p.m., SECN		at No. 15 South Carolina	L 60–75	6–17 (1–9)	15 – Lawrence	4 – tied	3 – Manjon	Colonial Life Arena (14,310); Columbia, SC
February 13, 2024; 6:00 p.m., ESPNU		Texas A&M	W 74–73	7–17 (2–9)	25 – Lubin	5 – Lubin	4 – Manjon	Memorial Gymnasium (6,564); Nashville, TN
February 17, 2024; 5:00 p.m., SECN		at No. 8 Tennessee; Rivalry	L 53–88	7–18 (2–10)	10 – Lubin	9 – Lang	3 – Manjon	Thompson–Boling Arena (21,678); Knoxville, TN
February 21, 2024; 7:30 p.m., SECN		Georgia	L 64–76	7–19 (2–11)	18 – Lewis	8 – Lubin	6 – Manjon	Memorial Gymnasium (5,821); Nashville, TN
February 24, 2024; 12:00 p.m., SECN		at No. 24 Florida	L 64–77	7–20 (2–12)	15 – Lubin	7 – Lubin	3 – Manjon	O'Connell Center (10,358); Gainesville, FL
February 27, 2024; 8:00 p.m., SECN		at Arkansas	W 85–82	8–20 (3–12)	22 – Manjon	12 – Lubin	3 – Manjon	Bud Walton Arena (19,200); Fayetteville, AR
March 2, 2024; 2:30 p.m., SECN		LSU	L 61–75	8–21 (3–13)	21 – Lawrence	4 – tied	2 – tied	Memorial Gymnasium (6,696); Nashville, TN
March 6, 2024; 8:00 p.m., SECN		at No. 15 Kentucky	L 77–93	8–22 (3–14)	23 – Lawrence	9 – Lawrence	7 – Manjon	Rupp Arena (20,322); Lexington, KY
March 9, 2024; 3:30 p.m., SECN		Florida	W 79–78	9–22 (4–14)	25 – Lubin	11 – Lubin	5 – Manjon	Memorial Gymnasium (6,442); Nashville, TN
SEC tournament
March 13, 2024; 6:00 p.m., SECN	(13)	vs. (12) Arkansas; First round	L 85–90 ^{OT}	9–23	29 – Manjon	10 – Lubin	6 – Manjon	Bridgestone Arena (16,539); Nashville, TN
*Non-conference game. ^{#}Rankings from AP poll. (#) Tournament seedings in parentheses. All times are in Central Time.

== See also ==
- 2023–24 Vanderbilt Commodores women's basketball team
