= 2023–24 Texas A&M Aggies men's basketball team =

American college basketball season

2023–24 Texas A&M Aggies men's basketball

NCAA tournament, Second Round
- Conference: Southeastern Conference
- Record: 21–15 (9–9 SEC)
- Head coach: Buzz Williams (5th season)
- Associate head coach: Devin Johnson
- Assistant coaches: Steve Roccaforte; Lyle Wolf
- Home arena: Reed Arena

2023–24 Southeastern Conference men's basketball standings
	Conf.				Overall
Team	W		L	PCT	W		L	PCT
No. 5 Tennessee	14	–	4	.778	27	–	9	.750
No. 20 Kentucky	13	–	5	.722	23	–	10	.697
No. 3т Alabama	13	–	5	.722	25	–	12	.676
No. 18 Auburn †	13	–	5	.722	27	–	8	.771
No. 25 South Carolina	13	–	5	.722	26	–	8	.765
Florida	11	–	7	.611	24	–	12	.667
Texas A&M	9	–	9	.500	21	–	15	.583
LSU	9	–	9	.500	17	–	16	.515
Mississippi State	8	–	10	.444	21	–	14	.600
Ole Miss	7	–	11	.389	20	–	12	.625
Georgia	6	–	12	.333	20	–	17	.541
Arkansas	6	–	12	.333	16	–	17	.485
Vanderbilt	4	–	14	.222	9	–	23	.281
Missouri	0	–	18	.000	8	–	24	.250
† 2024 SEC tournament winner Rankings from AP poll

The 2023–24 Texas A&M Aggies men's basketball team represented Texas A&M University during the 2023–24 NCAA Division I men's basketball season. The team were led by fifth-year head coach Buzz Williams and played their home games at Reed Arena in College Station, Texas as a member of the Southeastern Conference.

== Previous season ==
The Aggies finished the 2022–23 season 25–10, 15–3 in SEC play to finish in second place. As the No. 2 seed in the SEC tournament, they defeated Arkansas and Vanderbilt to advance to the championship game, where they lost to Alabama. The Aggies received an at-large bid to the NCAA Tournament as a No. 7 seed, where they were defeated in the first round by Penn State.

== Offseason ==
=== Departures ===
Name	Number	Pos.	Height	Weight	Year	Hometown	Reason for departure
Dexter Dennis	0	G	6'5"	210	GS senior	Baker, LA	Graduated
Khalen Robinson	1	G	6'0"	180	Junior	Little Rock, AR	Transferred to Little Rock
Erik Pratt	3	G	6'5"	185	Junior	Lake Worth, FL	Transferred to Milwaukee
Jordan Williams	5	G	6'3"	215	Freshman	Houston, TX	Transferred to Vanderbilt
Ethan Henderson	10	F	6'8"	193	RS senior	Little Rock, AR	Graduated
Andre Gordon	20	G	6'2"	185	Senior	Sidney, OH	Graduate transferred
Davin Watkins	22	G	6'1"	193	Sophomore	Nolensville, TN	Walk-on; didn't return
Javonte Brown	31	F	7'0"	255	RS sophomore	Toronto, ON	Transferred to Western Michigan
Ashton Smith	32	F	6'9"	270	RS freshman	Spring, TX	Transferred to Oral Roberts

=== Incoming transfers ===
Name	Number	Pos.	Height	Weight	Year	Hometown	Previous school
Jace Carter	0	G	6'5"	210	Junior	Titusville, FL	UIC
Eli Lawrence	5	G	6'5"	185	Senior	Atlanta, GA	Middle Tennessee
Wildens Leveque	10	F/C	6'10"	255	GS senior	Brockton, MA	UMass

=== Recruiting classes ===
==== 2023 recruiting class ====
College recruiting
Name	Hometown	School	Height	Weight	Commit date
Brandon White #41 C	Charlotte, NC	Donda Academy	6 ft 10 in (2.08 m)	230 lb (100 kg)	Apr 22, 2023
Brandon White #41 C	Recruit ratings: Rivals: 247Sports: ESPN: (81)				
Tyler Ringgold #61 PF	Baton Rouge, LA	Legacy Early College High School	6 ft 8 in (2.03 m)	210 lb (95 kg)	Jul 15, 2023
Tyler Ringgold #61 PF	Recruit ratings: Rivals: 247Sports: ESPN: (78)				
Bryce Lindsay; SG	Baltimore, MD	St. Frances Academy	6 ft 3 in (1.91 m)	160 lb (73 kg)	Nov 9, 2022
Bryce Lindsay; SG	Recruit ratings: Rivals: 247Sports: ESPN: (NR)				
Overall recruit ranking:
Note: In many cases, Scout, Rivals, 247Sports, On3, and ESPN may conflict in their listings of height and weight.; In these cases, the average was taken. ESPN grades are on a 100-point scale.; Sources: "Texas A&M 2023 Basketball Commitments". Rivals.; "2023 Team Ranking". Rivals.

==== 2024 recruiting class ====
College recruiting (2024)
Name	Hometown	School	Height	Weight	Commit date
George Turkson #28 PF	Lawrence, MA	Bradford Christian School	6 ft 8 in (2.03 m)	210 lb (95 kg)	May 10, 2023
George Turkson #28 PF	Recruit ratings: Rivals: 247Sports: ESPN: (81)				
Rob Dockery #38 SF	Washington, DC	Woodrow Wilson High School	6 ft 6 in (1.98 m)	195 lb (88 kg)	Dec 25, 2022
Rob Dockery #38 SF	Recruit ratings: Rivals: 247Sports: ESPN: (81)				
Andre Mills #64 SG	Chestnut Hill, MA	Brimmer & May	6 ft 4 in (1.93 m)	180 lb (82 kg)	Apr 11, 2023
Andre Mills #64 SG	Recruit ratings: Rivals: 247Sports: ESPN: (78)				
Overall recruit ranking:
Note: In many cases, Scout, Rivals, 247Sports, On3, and ESPN may conflict in their listings of height and weight.; In these cases, the average was taken. ESPN grades are on a 100-point scale.; Sources: "Texas A&M 2024 Basketball Commitments". Rivals.; "2024 Team Ranking". Rivals.

== Roster ==
2023–24 Texas A&M Aggies men's basketball team
Players
Coaches

Pos.	#	Name	Height	Weight	Year	Previous school	Hometown
G	0	Jace Carter	6 ft 6 in (1.98 m)	220 lb (100 kg)	Jr	UIC	Titusville, Florida
G	2	Hayden Hefner	6 ft 6 in (1.98 m)	185 lb (84 kg)	Sr	Nederland High School	Nederland, Texas
G	3	Bryce Lindsay	6 ft 3 in (1.91 m)	190 lb (86 kg)	Fr	Saint Frances Academy	Baltimore, Maryland
G	4	Wade Taylor IV	6 ft 0 in (1.83 m)	175 lb (79 kg)	Jr	Lancaster High School	Lancaster, Texas
G	5	Eli Lawrence	6 ft 5 in (1.96 m)	190 lb (86 kg)	Sr	Middle Tennessee	Atlanta, Georgia
F/C	10	Wildens Leveque	6 ft 10 in (2.08 m)	250 lb (113 kg)	GS	UMass	Brockton, Massachusetts
F	11	Andersson Garcia	6 ft 8 in (2.03 m)	215 lb (98 kg)	Jr	Mississippi State	Moca, Dominican Republic
F	13	Solomon Washington	6 ft 7 in (2.01 m)	220 lb (100 kg)	So	Carver High School	New Orleans, Louisiana
F	15	Henry Coleman III	6 ft 8 in (2.03 m)	245 lb (111 kg)	Sr	Duke	Richmond, Virginia
F	21	Tyler Ringgold	6 ft 8 in (2.03 m)	220 lb (100 kg)	Fr	Southern University Lab School	Baton Rouge, Louisiana
G	23	Tyrece Radford	6 ft 2 in (1.88 m)	190 lb (86 kg)	GS	Virginia Tech	Baton Rouge, Louisiana
G	24	Jaelyn Lee (W)	6 ft 6 in (1.98 m)	200 lb (91 kg)	RS Fr	Paris High School	Paris, Texas
C	32	Brandon White	6 ft 10 in (2.08 m)	245 lb (111 kg)	Fr	Donda Academy	Spencer, North Carolina
F	34	Julius Marble II	6 ft 9 in (2.06 m)	235 lb (107 kg)	Sr	Michigan State	Dallas, Texas
G	35	Manny Obaseki	6 ft 4 in (1.93 m)	195 lb (88 kg)	Jr	John Paul II High School	Allen, Texas

Head coach

- Buzz Williams (Oklahoma City)

Assistant coach(es)

- Devin Johnson (LSU New Orleans)
- Steve Roccaforte (Lamar)
- Lyle Wolf (Transylvania)

Legend

- (C) Team captain
- (S) Suspended
- (I) Ineligible
- (W) Walk-on
- Injured
- Current redshirt

Roster

== Schedule and results ==
Date time, TV	Rank^{#}	Opponent^{#}	Result	Record	High points	High rebounds	High assists	Site (attendance) city, state
Exhibition
October 21, 2023*; 1:00 p.m.	No. 15	vs. No. 20 Baylor; Secret Scrimmage	W 78–73	–	20 – Tied	5 – Garcia	3 – Tied	Reed Arena (–); College Station, TX
October 29, 2023*; 4:30 p.m.	No. 15	vs. Texas Tech; Compete 4 Cause Classic	L 84–89	–	25 – Taylor IV	9 – Garcia	3 – Radford	The Super Pit (–); Denton, TX
Non-conference regular season
November 6, 2023*; 7:00 p.m., SECN+/ESPN+	No. 15	Texas A&M–Commerce	W 78–46	1–0	19 – Hefner	8 – Coleman III	6 – Taylor IV	Reed Arena (8,802); College Station, TX
November 10, 2023*; 6:00 p.m., Peacock	No. 15	at Ohio State	W 73–66	2–0	21 – Tied	13 – Garcia	4 – Taylor IV	Value City Arena (12,704); Columbus, OH
November 14, 2023*; 7:00 p.m., ESPN+	No. 13	at SMU	W 79–66	3–0	21 – Radford	15 – Coleman III	5 – Taylor IV	Moody Coliseum (6,852); Dallas, TX
November 17, 2023*; 7:00 p.m., SECN+/ESPN+	No. 13	Oral Roberts	W 74–66	4–0	19 – Coleman III	10 – Coleman III	4 – Tied	Reed Arena (10,689); College Station, TX
November 23, 2023*; 11:00 a.m., ESPN2	No. 12	vs. Penn State; ESPN Events Invitational quarterfinals	W 89–77	5–0	24 – Coleman III	6 – Tied	4 – Garcia	State Farm Field House (–); Bay Lake, FL
November 24, 2023*; 10:00 a.m., ESPN2	No. 12	vs. No. 19 Florida Atlantic; ESPN Events Invitational semifinals	L 89–96	5–1	35 – Taylor IV	13 – Garcia	5 – Taylor IV	State Farm Field House (–); Bay Lake, FL
November 26, 2023*; 5:30 p.m., ESPN2	No. 12	vs. Iowa State; ESPN Events Invitational 3rd place game	W 73–69	6–1	18 – Washington	8 – Carter	4 – Taylor IV	State Farm Field House (1,964); Bay Lake, FL
November 29, 2023*; 6:15 p.m., ESPN2	No. 14	at Virginia; ACC–SEC Challenge	L 47–59	6–2	16 – Coleman III	14 – Coleman III	4 – Taylor IV	John Paul Jones Arena (14,061); Charlottesville, VA
December 6, 2023*; 8:00 p.m., SECN	No. 21	DePaul	W 89–64	7–2	14 – Carter	9 – Coleman III	6 – Taylor IV	Reed Arena (8,310); College Station, TX
December 10, 2023*; 3:00 p.m., ESPN2	No. 21	Memphis	L 75–81	7–3	21 – Obaseki	14 – Garcia	8 – Taylor IV	Reed Arena (9,565); College Station, TX
December 16, 2023*; 1:30 p.m., ESPN2		vs. No. 4 Houston; The Halal Guys Showcase	L 66–70	7–4	34 – Taylor IV	12 – Coleman III	4 – Taylor IV	Toyota Center (12,152); Houston, TX
December 22, 2023*; 7:00 p.m., SECN		Houston Christian	W 79–52	8–4	24 – Hefner	19 – Garcia	5 – Washington	Reed Arena (5,475); College Station, TX
December 30, 2023*; 8:00 p.m., SECN		Prairie View A&M	W 79–54	9–4	20 – Coleman III	13 – Coleman III	4 – Taylor IV	Reed Arena (8,610); College Station, TX
SEC regular season
January 6, 2024; 7:30 p.m., SECN		LSU	L 53–68	9–5 (0–1)	23 – Taylor IV	7 – Carter	3 – Hefner	Reed Arena (10,525); College Station, TX
January 9, 2024; 8:00 p.m., ESPN2		at No. 16 Auburn	L 55–66	9–6 (0–2)	17 – Coleman III	13 – Garcia	3 – Radford	Neville Arena (9,121); Auburn, AL
January 13, 2024; 2:00 p.m., ESPN		No. 6 Kentucky	W 97–92 ^{OT}	10–6 (1–2)	31 – Taylor IV	9 – Radford	5 – Taylor IV	Reed Arena (9,540); College Station, TX
January 16, 2024; 8:00 p.m., SECN		at Arkansas	L 77–78	10–7 (1–3)	41 – Taylor IV	12 – Garcia	2 – Radford	Bud Walton Arena (19,200); Fayetteville, AR
January 20, 2024; 3:00 p.m., ESPNU		at LSU	W 73–69	11–7 (2–3)	19 – Taylor IV	10 – Garcia	4 – Tied	Pete Maravich Assembly Center (9,085); Baton Rouge, LA
January 23, 2024; 8:00 p.m., SECN		Missouri	W 63–57	12–7 (3–3)	19 – Taylor IV	8 – Washington	3 – Taylor IV	Reed Arena (9,623); College Station, TX
January 27, 2024; 7:30 p.m., SECN		Ole Miss	L 68–71	12–8 (3–4)	30 – Taylor IV	12 – Carter	3 – Tied	Reed Arena (12,610); College Station, TX
February 3, 2024; 3:00 p.m., ESPN2		Florida	W 67–66	13–8 (4–4)	26 – Radford	6 – Tied	3 – Washington	Reed Arena (11,793); College Station, TX
February 7, 2024; 8:00 p.m., ESPN2		at Missouri	W 79–60	14–8 (5–4)	22 – Radford	16 – Garcia	5 – Garcia	Mizzou Arena (9,814); Columbia, MO
February 10, 2024; 7:00 p.m., ESPN		No. 6 Tennessee	W 85–69	15–8 (6–4)	27 – Radford	17 – Garcia	7 – Taylor IV	Reed Arena (12,995); College Station, TX
February 13, 2024; 6:00 p.m., ESPNU		at Vanderbilt	L 73–74	15–9 (6–5)	18 – Taylor IV	6 – Garcia	4 – Radford	Memorial Gymnasium (6,564); Nashville, TN
February 17, 2024; 11:00 a.m., ESPN		at No. 15 Alabama	L 75–100	15–10 (6–6)	22 – Radford	12 – Garcia	3 – Taylor IV	Coleman Coliseum (13,474); Tuscaloosa, AL
February 20, 2024; 6:00 p.m., ESPN		Arkansas	L 71–78	15–11 (6–7)	14 – Carter	15 – Garcia	9 – Taylor IV	Reed Arena (8,789); College Station, TX
February 24, 2024; 7:00 p.m., ESPN		at No. 5 Tennessee	L 51–86	15–12 (6–8)	11 – Tied	8 – Tied	5 – Taylor IV	Thompson–Boling Arena (22,322); Knoxville, TN
February 28, 2024; 7:30 p.m., SECN		No. 18 South Carolina	L 68–70	15–13 (6–9)	19 – Radford	12 – Garcia	4 – Taylor IV	Reed Arena (9,255); College Station, TX
March 2, 2024; 5:00 p.m., SECN		at Georgia	W 70–56	16–13 (7–9)	20 – Radford	10 – Tied	4 – Tied	Stegeman Coliseum (8,165); Athens, GA
March 6, 2024; 8:00 p.m., ESPNU		Mississippi State	W 75–69	17–13 (8–9)	17 – Obaseki	9 – Washington	6 – Taylor IV	Reed Arena (8,163); College Station, TX
March 9, 2024; 1:00 p.m., CBS		at Ole Miss	W 86–60	18–13 (9–9)	25 – Obaseki	13 – Garcia	7 – Taylor IV	SJB Pavilion (7,819); Oxford, MS
SEC tournament
March 14, 2024; 6:00 p.m., SECN	(7)	vs. (10) Ole Miss; Second Round	W 80–71	19–13	20 – Taylor IV	14 – Garcia	4 – Taylor IV	Bridgestone Arena (13,771); Nashville, TN
March 15, 2024; 6:00 p.m., SECN	(7)	vs. (2) No. 9 Kentucky; Quarterfinals	W 97–87	20–13	32 – Taylor IV	7 – Tied	6 – Radford	Bridgestone Arena (−); Nashville, TN
March 16, 2024; 2:30 p.m., ESPN	(7)	vs. (6) Florida; Semifinals	L 90–95	20–14	30 – Taylor IV	9 – Washington	4 – Taylor IV	Bridgestone Arena (16,499); Nashville, TN
NCAA tournament
March 22, 2024*; 5:50 p.m., CBS	(9 S)	vs. (8 S) Nebraska; First Round	W 98–83	21–14	25 – Taylor IV	10 – Radford	5 – Tied	FedExForum; Memphis, TN
March 24, 2024*; 7:40 p.m., TNT	(9 S)	vs. (1 S) No. 2 Houston; Second Round	L 95–100 ^{OT}	21–15	27 – Radford	15 – Radford	6 – Radford	FedExForum (13,506); Memphis, TN
*Non-conference game. ^{#}Rankings from AP Poll. (#) Tournament seedings in parentheses. S=South region. All times are in Central Time.

== See also ==
- 2023–24 Texas A&M Aggies women's basketball team
