= 2023–24 Georgia Bulldogs basketball team =

American college basketball season

2023–24 Georgia Bulldogs basketball

NIT, Semifinals
- Conference: Southeastern Conference
- Record: 20–17 (6–12 SEC)
- Head coach: Mike White (2nd season)
- Assistant coaches: Antonio Reynolds-Dean (2nd season); Erik Pastrana (2nd season); Akeem Miskdeen (2nd season); Patrick Blake (1st season)
- Home arena: Stegeman Coliseum

2023–24 Southeastern Conference men's basketball standings
	Conf.				Overall
Team	W		L	PCT	W		L	PCT
No. 5 Tennessee	14	–	4	.778	27	–	9	.750
No. 20 Kentucky	13	–	5	.722	23	–	10	.697
No. 3т Alabama	13	–	5	.722	25	–	12	.676
No. 18 Auburn †	13	–	5	.722	27	–	8	.771
No. 25 South Carolina	13	–	5	.722	26	–	8	.765
Florida	11	–	7	.611	24	–	12	.667
Texas A&M	9	–	9	.500	21	–	15	.583
LSU	9	–	9	.500	17	–	16	.515
Mississippi State	8	–	10	.444	21	–	14	.600
Ole Miss	7	–	11	.389	20	–	12	.625
Georgia	6	–	12	.333	20	–	17	.541
Arkansas	6	–	12	.333	16	–	17	.485
Vanderbilt	4	–	14	.222	9	–	23	.281
Missouri	0	–	18	.000	8	–	24	.250
† 2024 SEC tournament winner Rankings from AP poll

The 2023–24 Georgia Bulldogs basketball team represented the University of Georgia during the 2023–24 NCAA Division I men's basketball season. The Bulldogs were led by second-year head coach, Mike White. The Bulldogs played their home games at the Stegeman Coliseum in Athens, Georgia as members of the Southeastern Conference. They finished the regular season 17–16, 6–12 in SEC play to finish in eleventh place. They defeated Missouri in the first round of the SEC tournament to advance to the second round where they lost to Florida. They were invited to the National Invitation Tournament, where they defeated Xavier, Wake Forest, and Ohio State to advance to the tournament semifinal, before losing to Seton Hall. This was their first postseason appearance since the 2016–17 season.

== Previous season ==
The Bulldogs finished the 2022–23 season 16–16, 6–12 in SEC play to finish in eleventh place. They were not invited to the postseason.

== Offseason ==
=== Departures ===
Departures
Name	Number	Pos.	Height	Weight	Year	Hometown	Notes	Ref.
Terry Roberts	0	G	6'3"	180	Senior	North Amityville, NY	Undrafted in NBA draft	
Kario Oquendo	3	G	6'4"	220	Junior	Titusville, FL	Transferred to Oregon	
Jusaun Holt	4	G	6'7"	190	Sophomore	Tacoma, WA	Transferred to Kennesaw State	
Jaxon Etter	10	G	6'4"	205	Senior	Woodstock, GA	Graduated	
Mardrez McBride	13	G	6'2"	180	Senior	Augusta, GA	Graduated	
Jailyn Ingram	15	F	6'7"	225	Senior	Madison, GA	Graduated	
Braelen Bridges	23	C	6'11"	245	Senior	Atlanta, GA	Graduated	

=== Incoming transfers ===
Incoming transfers
Name	Number	Pos.	Height	Weight	Year	Hometown	Previous School	Ref.
Noah Thomasson	3	G	6'4"	210	Senior	Houston, TX	Niagara	
RJ Sunahara	10	G	6'8"	205	RS Senior	Bay Village, OH	Nova Southeastern	
RJ Meléndez	15	G	6'7"	210	Junior	Arecibo, Puerto Rico	Illinois	
Jalen DeLoach	23	F	6'9"	220	Junior	Savannah, GA	VCU	
Russel Tchewa	54	C	7'0"	275	Senior	Douala, Cameroon	South Florida	

=== 2023 recruiting class ===
College recruiting information
Name	Hometown	School	Height	Weight	Commit date
Blue Cain #10 SG	Knoxville, TN	IMG Academy	6 ft 5 in (1.96 m)	194 lb (88 kg)	May 3, 2023
Blue Cain #10 SG	Recruit ratings: Rivals: 247Sports: ESPN: (85)				
Mari Jordan; F	Atlanta, GA	Norcross High School	6 ft 6 in (1.98 m)	190 lb (86 kg)	Dec 29, 2021
Mari Jordan; F	Recruit ratings: Rivals: 247Sports: ESPN: (83)				
Dylan James; F	Winter Haven, FL	Winter Haven High School	6 ft 9 in (2.06 m)	207 lb (94 kg)	Sep 30, 2022
Dylan James; F	Recruit ratings: Rivals: 247Sports: ESPN: (82)				
Silas Demary Jr. F	Raleigh, NC	Combine Academy	6 ft 5 in (1.96 m)	190 lb (86 kg)	Apr 24, 2023
Silas Demary Jr. F	Recruit ratings: Rivals: 247Sports: ESPN: (81)				
Markel Jennings; F	Athens, GA	Athens Academy	5 ft 11 in (1.80 m)	156 lb (71 kg)	
Markel Jennings; F	Recruit ratings: No ratings found				
Overall recruit ranking:
Note: In many cases, Scout, Rivals, 247Sports, On3, and ESPN may conflict in their listings of height and weight.; In these cases, the average was taken. ESPN grades are on a 100-point scale.; Sources: "Georgia 2023 Basketball Commitments". Rivals.; "2023 Team Ranking". Rivals.

== Roster ==
2023–24 Georgia Bulldogs men's basketball team
Players
Coaches

Pos.	#	Name	Height	Weight	Year	Previous school	Hometown
G	0	Blue Cain	6 ft 5 in (1.96 m)	194 lb (88 kg)	Fr	IMG Academy	Knoxville, TN (United States) (Tennessee)
G	1	Jabri Abdur-Rahim	6 ft 8 in (2.03 m)	215 lb (98 kg)	Sr	Blair Academy; Virginia	South Orange, NJ (United States) (New Jersey)
G	2	Mari Jordan	6 ft 6 in (1.98 m)	190 lb (86 kg)	Fr	Norcross HS	Atlanta, GA (United States) (Georgia (U.S. state))
G	3	Noah Thomasson	6 ft 4 in (1.93 m)	210 lb (95 kg)	Sr	George Ranch HS; Niagara	Houston, TX (United States) (Texas)
G	4	Silas Demary Jr.	6 ft 5 in (1.96 m)	190 lb (86 kg)	Fr	Combine Academy	Raleigh, NC (United States) (North Carolina)
C	5	Frank Anselem-Ibe	6 ft 10 in (2.08 m)	215 lb (98 kg)	Sr	Prolific Prep; Syracuse	Lagos, Nigeria
G	10	RJ Sunahara	6 ft 8 in (2.03 m)	205 lb (93 kg)	RS Sr	Bay HS; Nova Southeastern	Bay Village, OH (United States) (Ohio)
G	11	Justin Hill	6 ft 0 in (1.83 m)	185 lb (84 kg)	Sr	Travis HS; Longwood	Houston, TX (United States) (Texas)
F	12	Matthew-Alexander Moncrieffe	6 ft 8 in (2.03 m)	217 lb (98 kg)	Sr	Orangeville Prep; Oklahoma State	Toronto, ON (Canada) (Ontario)
F	13	Dylan James	6 ft 9 in (2.06 m)	207 lb (94 kg)	Fr	Winter Haven HS	Winter Haven, FL (United States) (Florida)
G	14	Markel Jennings	5 ft 11 in (1.8 m)	156 lb (71 kg)	Fr	Athens Academy	Athens, GA (United States) (Georgia (U.S. state))
G	15	RJ Meléndez	6 ft 7 in (2.01 m)	210 lb (95 kg)	Jr	Central Pointe Christian Academy; Illinois	Arecibo, Puerto Rico
G	22	Brandon Klatsky	6 ft 4 in (1.93 m)	170 lb (77 kg)	RS Fr	Ranney School	Colts Neck, NJ (United States) (New Jersey)
F	23	Jalen DeLoach	6 ft 9 in (2.06 m)	220 lb (100 kg)	Jr	The Skill Factory; VCU	Savannah, GA (United States) (Georgia (U.S. state))
F	24	Jaden Newell	6 ft 8 in (2.03 m)	219 lb (99 kg)	RS Fr	Choctawhatchee HS; Iona	Destin, FL (United States) (Florida)
C	54	Russel Tchewa	7 ft 0 in (2.13 m)	275 lb (125 kg)	Sr	Putnam Science Academy; South Florida	Douala, Cameroon

Head coach

- Mike White (Ole Miss)

Assistant coach(es)

- Antonio Reynolds Dean (Rhode Island)
- Akeem Miskdeen (Queens (NC))
- Erik Pastrana (Florida State)
- Patrick Blake (Mississippi)

Legend

- (C) Team captain
- (S) Suspended
- (I) Ineligible
- (W) Walk-on
- Injured
- Current redshirt

Roster

== Schedule and results ==
Date time, TV	Rank^{#}	Opponent^{#}	Result	Record	High points	High rebounds	High assists	Site (attendance) city, state
Exhibition
October 30, 2023*; 6:30 p.m.		Eastern Kentucky	W 99–82	–	21 – Meléndez	{{{rebounds}}} –	{{{assists}}} –	Stegeman Coliseum; Athens, GA
Non-conference regular season
November 6, 2023*; 4:30 p.m., TruTV		vs. Oregon; 2023 Hall of Fame Series	L 71–82	0–1	18 – Abdur–Rahim	9 – Tchewa	4 – Hill	T-Mobile Arena (–); Paradise, NV
November 10, 2023*; 7:00 p.m., SECN		Wake Forest	W 80–77	1–1	21 – Thomasson	7 – DeLoach	3 – Thomasson	Stegeman Coliseum (8,176); Athens, GA
November 12, 2023*; 5:00 p.m., SECN+/ESPN+		North Carolina Central	W 64–54	2–1	13 – Abdur–Rahim	7 – Cain	4 – Hill	Stegeman Coliseum (5,699); Athens, GA
November 17, 2023*; 3:30 p.m., CBSSN		vs. No. 12 Miami (FL); Baha Mar Hoops Bahamas Championship semifinals	L 68–79	2–2	18 – Cain	8 – Demary Jr.	7 – Demary Jr.	Baha Mar Convention Center (1,856); Nassau, Bahamas
November 19, 2023*; 12:00 p.m., CBSSN		vs. Providence; Baha Mar Hoops Bahamas consolation	L 64–71	2–3	19 – Thomasson	6 – DeLoach	3 – Tied	Baha Mar Convention Center (–); Nassau, Bahamas
November 24, 2023*; 5:00 p.m., SECN+/ESPN+		Winthrop	W 78–69	3–3	24 – Thomasson	8 – Tchewa	3 – Tied	Stegeman Coliseum (6,046); Athens, GA
November 29, 2023*; 9:15 p.m., ACCN		at Florida State; ACC–SEC Challenge	W 68–66	4–3	15 – Demary Jr.	11 – Melendez	3 – Tied	Donald L. Tucker Civic Center (6,688); Tallahassee, FL
December 1, 2023*; 7:00 p.m., SECN+/ESPN+		Mercer	W 80–69	5–3	18 – Melendez	8 – Tchewa	3 – Anselem-Ibe	Stegeman Coliseum (5,694); Athens, GA
December 5, 2023*; 7:30 p.m., SECN		Georgia Tech	W 76–62	6–3	16 – Thomasson	9 – Tchewa	4 – Hill	Stegeman Coliseum (9,017); Athens, GA
December 16, 2023*; 5:30 p.m., SECN		High Point	W 66–58	7–3	12 – Demary Jr.	7 – Melendez	4 – Demary Jr.	Stegeman Coliseum (6,523); Athens, GA
December 20, 2023*; 7:00 p.m., SECN+/ESPN+		Mount St. Mary's	W 94–82	8–3	23 – Abdur–Rahim	6 – Melendez	8 – Hill	Stegeman Coliseum (6,045); Athens, GA
December 22, 2023*; 3:00 p.m., SECN+/ESPN+		North Florida	W 78–60	9–3	18 – Abdur–Rahim	6 – Tchewa	6 – Demary Jr.	Stegeman Coliseum (6,603); Athens, GA
December 30, 2023*; 2:30 p.m., SECN+/ESPN+		Alabama A&M	W 93–73	10–3	18 – Cain	8 – Tchewa	5 – Demary Jr.	Stegeman Coliseum (7,793); Athens, GA
SEC regular season
January 6, 2024; 1:00 p.m., SECN		at Missouri	W 75–68	11–3 (1–0)	18 – Tchewa	10 – Tchewa	4 – Hill	Mizzou Arena (12,407); Columbia, MO
January 10, 2024; 9:00 p.m., ESPNU		Arkansas	W 76–66	12–3 (2–0)	19 – Hill	8 – Tchewa	2 – Tied	Stegeman Coliseum (7,820); Athens, GA
January 13, 2024; 12:00 p.m., ESPN2		No. 5 Tennessee	L 79–85	12–4 (2–1)	21 – Abdur–Rahim	6 – Melendez	4 – Hill	Stegeman Coliseum (10,523); Athens, GA
January 16, 2024; 9:00 p.m., ESPNU		at South Carolina	W 74–69	13–4 (3–1)	15 – Demary Jr.	8 – Abdur–Rahim	5 – Hill	Colonial Life Arena (12,404); Columbia, SC
January 20, 2024; 6:00 p.m., SECN		at No. 8 Kentucky	L 96–105	13–5 (3–2)	34 – Abdur–Rahim	9 – Tchewa	6 – Hill	Rupp Arena (20,283); Lexington, KY
January 24, 2024; 6:30 p.m., SECN		LSU	W 68–66	14–5 (4–2)	15 – Demary Jr.	11 – Tchewa	2 – Thomasson	Stegeman Coliseum (9,243); Athens, GA
January 27, 2024; 12:00 p.m., ESPN2		at Florida	L 98–102 ^{OT}	14–6 (4–3)	35 – Melendez	11 – Tchewa	9 – Hill	O'Connell Center (10,045); Gainesville, FL
January 31, 2024; 6:30 p.m., SECN		No. 24 Alabama	L 76–85	14–7 (4–4)	15 – Tied	10 – Melendez	4 – Hill	Stegeman Coliseum (10,523); Athens, GA
February 3, 2024; 1:00 p.m., SECN		South Carolina	L 62–72	14–8 (4–5)	20 – Abdur–Rahim	6 – Tchewa	4 – Hill	Stegeman Coliseum (10,523); Athens, GA
February 7, 2024; 9:00 p.m., SECN		at Mississippi State	L 62–75	14–9 (4–6)	20 – Thomasson	5 – Tied	4 – Hill	Humphrey Coliseum (8,755); Starkville, MS
February 10, 2024; 6:00 p.m., SECN		at Arkansas	L 75–78	14–10 (4–7)	19 – Demary Jr.	4 – Tied	3 – Tied	Bud Walton Arena (19,200); Fayetteville, AR
February 17, 2024; 1:00 p.m., SECN		Florida	L 82–88	14–11 (4–8)	26 – Thomasson	6 – DeLoach	4 – Hill	Stegeman Coliseum (10,523); Athens, GA
February 21, 2024; 8:30 p.m., SECN		at Vanderbilt	W 76–64	15–11 (5–8)	17 – Thomasson	10 – Tchewa	4 – Hill	Memorial Gymnasium (5,821); Nashville, TN
February 24, 2024; 6:00 p.m., SECN		No. 14 Auburn	L 76–97	15–12 (5–9)	18 – Thomasson	7 – Tchewa	2 – Demary Jr.	Stegeman Coliseum (10,523); Athens, GA
February 27, 2024; 7:00 p.m., SECN		at LSU	L 66–67	15–13 (5–10)	16 – Thomasson	7 – Demary Jr.	4 – Demary Jr.	Pete Maravich Assembly Center (7,621); Baton Rouge, LA
March 2, 2024; 6:00 p.m., SECN		Texas A&M	L 56–70	15–14 (5–11)	11 – Cain	6 – Thomasson	4 – Thomasson	Stegeman Coliseum (8,165); Athens, GA
March 5, 2024; 7:00 p.m., SECN		Ole Miss	W 69–66	16–14 (6–11)	15 – Thomasson	10 – Tchewa	5 – Tchewa	Stegeman Coliseum (6,219); Athens, GA
March 9, 2024; 6:30 p.m., SECN		at No. 13 Auburn	L 78–92	16–15 (6–12)	15 – Demary Jr.	10 – Tchewa	3 – Tchewa	Neville Arena (9,121); Auburn, AL
SEC tournament
March 13, 2024; 9:30 p.m., SECN	(11)	vs. (14) Missouri; First Round	W 64–59	17–15	19 – Cain	6 – Tchewa	3 – Tied	Bridgestone Arena (16,539); Nashville, TN
March 14, 2024; 9:30 p.m., SECN	(11)	vs. (6) Florida; Second Round	L 80–85	17–16	14 – Tied	5 – DeLoach	3 – Tied	Bridgestone Arena (13,771); Nashville, TN
NIT
March 19, 2024; 7:00 p.m., ESPN	(4)	Xavier; First Round – Wake Forest bracket	W 78–76	18–16	16 – Demary Jr.	6 – Tied	4 – Tied	Stegeman Coliseum (2,756); Athens, GA
March 24, 2024; 4:00 p.m., ESPN2	(4)	at (1) Wake Forest; Second Round – Wake Forest bracket	W 72–66	19–16	21 – Hill	8 – Anselem–Ibe	4 – DeLoach	LJVM Coliseum (4,772); Winston-Salem, NC
March 26, 2024; 7:00 p.m., ESPN	(4)	at (2) Ohio State; Quarterfinals – Wake Forest bracket	W 79–77	20–16	21 – Thomasson	10 – Anselem–Ibe	5 – Hill	Value City Arena (7,641); Columbus, OH
April 2, 2024; 9:30 p.m., ESPN2	(4)	vs. (1) Seton Hall; Semifinals	L 67–84	20–17	19 – Demary Jr.	4 – Tied	4 – Demary Jr.	Hinkle Fieldhouse; Indianapolis, IN
*Non-conference game. ^{#}Rankings from AP Poll. (#) Tournament seedings in parentheses. All times are in Eastern Time.
