= 2023–24 South Carolina Gamecocks men's basketball team =

American men's college basketball team

2023–24 South Carolina Gamecocks men's basketball

Arizona Tip-Off (Cactus Division) champions

NCAA tournament, First Round
- Conference: Southeastern Conference

Ranking
- Coaches: No. 23
- AP: No. 25
- Record: 26–8 (13–5 SEC)
- Head coach: Lamont Paris (2nd season)
- Assistant coaches: Tanner Bronson; Tim Buckley; Eddie Shannon
- Home arena: Colonial Life Arena

2023–24 Southeastern Conference men's basketball standings
	Conf.				Overall
Team	W		L	PCT	W		L	PCT
No. 5 Tennessee	14	–	4	.778	27	–	9	.750
No. 20 Kentucky	13	–	5	.722	23	–	10	.697
No. 3т Alabama	13	–	5	.722	25	–	12	.676
No. 18 Auburn †	13	–	5	.722	27	–	8	.771
No. 25 South Carolina	13	–	5	.722	26	–	8	.765
Florida	11	–	7	.611	24	–	12	.667
Texas A&M	9	–	9	.500	21	–	15	.583
LSU	9	–	9	.500	17	–	16	.515
Mississippi State	8	–	10	.444	21	–	14	.600
Ole Miss	7	–	11	.389	20	–	12	.625
Georgia	6	–	12	.333	20	–	17	.541
Arkansas	6	–	12	.333	16	–	17	.485
Vanderbilt	4	–	14	.222	9	–	23	.281
Missouri	0	–	18	.000	8	–	24	.250
† 2024 SEC tournament winner Rankings from AP poll

The 2023–24 South Carolina Gamecocks men's basketball team represented the University of South Carolina during the 2023–24 NCAA Division I men's basketball season. The team, led by second-year head coach Lamont Paris, played their home games at Colonial Life Arena in Columbia, South Carolina as a member of the Southeastern Conference. The South Carolina Gamecocks men's basketball team drew an average home attendance of 13,397 in 17 games in 2023-24.

South Carolina achieved its first ranking since 2017, as well as its highest ranking since 1997. The Gamecocks made their first appearance in the NCAA Tournament since 2017, losing in the first round to Oregon. Their final total of 26 wins is tied for the most wins in school history. For leading his team to a historic turnaround - from finishing next to last in the SEC the previous season to finishing the 2024 season tied for second place in the conference - Lamont Paris was awarded SEC Coach of the Year.

== Previous season ==
The Gamecocks finished the 2022–23 season 11–20, 4–14 in SEC play to finish in twelfth place. As the No. 12 seed in the SEC tournament, they lost to Ole Miss in the first round.

== Offseason ==
=== Departures ===
Name	Number	Pos.	Height	Weight	Year	Hometown	Reason for departure
Chico Carter Jr.	2	G	6'3"	192	Senior	Columbia, SC	Graduate transferred to DePaul
Tre-Vaugh Minott	4	F	6'9"	258	Junior	Montreal, QC	Transferred to Portland State
Hayden Brown	10	F	6'5"	234	GS Senior	Greer, SC	Graduated
Ja'Von Benson	21	F	6'7"	253	Junior	Columbia, SC	Transferred to Hampton
G. G. Jackson	23	F	6'9	215	Freshman	Columbia, SC	Declare for 2023 NBA draft; selected 45th overall by Memphis Grizzlies
Daniel Hankins-Sanford	30	F	6'8"	233	Freshman	Charlotte, NC	Transferred to UMass
Ford Cooper Jr.	44	G	6'3"	193	Senior	Charlotte, NC	Walk-on; graduate transferred to Hampton

=== Incoming transfers ===
Name	Number	Pos.	Height	Weight	Year	Hometown	Previous school
B.J. Mack	2	F/C	6'8"	245	GS Senior	Charlotte, NC	Wofford
Stephen Clark	4	F	6'8"	205	GS Senior	Charlotte, NC	The Citadel
Myles Stute	10	F	6'7"	215	Senior	Washington, D.C.	Vanderbilt
Ta'Lon Cooper	55	G	6'4"	195	Senior	Roebuck, SC	Minnesota

=== Recruiting classes ===
==== 2023 recruiting class ====
College recruiting information
Name	Hometown	School	Height	Weight	Commit date
Collin Murray-Boyles #19 SF	Columbia, SC	A. C. Flora High School	6 ft 7 in (2.01 m)	200 lb (91 kg)	Aug 7, 2022
Collin Murray-Boyles #19 SF	Recruit ratings: Rivals: 247Sports: ESPN: (84)				
Arden Conyers #83 SF	Columbia, SC	Westwood High School	6 ft 7 in (2.01 m)	190 lb (86 kg)	Aug 8, 2022
Arden Conyers #83 SF	Recruit ratings: Rivals: 247Sports: ESPN: (77)				
Morris Ugusuk; PG	Finland	N/A	6 ft 3 in (1.91 m)	N/A	May 3, 2023
Morris Ugusuk; PG	Recruit ratings: Rivals: 247Sports: ESPN: (NR)				
Overall recruit ranking:
Note: In many cases, Scout, Rivals, 247Sports, On3, and ESPN may conflict in their listings of height and weight.; In these cases, the average was taken. ESPN grades are on a 100-point scale.; Sources: "South Carolina 2023 Basketball Commitments". Rivals.; "2023 South Carolina Gamecocks Recruiting Class". ESPN.; "2023 Team Ranking". Rivals.

==== 2024 recruiting class ====
College recruiting information (2024)
Name	Hometown	School	Height	Weight	Commit date
Okku Federiko; PF	Helsinki, Finland	N/A	6 ft 9 in (2.06 m)	200 lb (91 kg)	Apr 29, 2023
Okku Federiko; PF	Recruit ratings: Rivals: 247Sports: ESPN: (NR)				
Trent Noah; SF/SG	Harlan, KY	Harlan County	6 ft 6 in (1.98 m)	200 lb (91 kg)	Oct 1, 2023
Trent Noah; SF/SG	Recruit ratings: Rivals: 247Sports: ESPN: (NR)				
Overall recruit ranking:
Note: In many cases, Scout, Rivals, 247Sports, On3, and ESPN may conflict in their listings of height and weight.; In these cases, the average was taken. ESPN grades are on a 100-point scale.; Sources: "South Carolina 2024 Basketball Commitments". Rivals.; "2024 South Carolina Gamecocks Recruiting Class". ESPN.; "2024 Team Ranking". Rivals.

== Roster ==
2023–24 South Carolina Gamecocks men's basketball team
Players
Coaches

Pos.	#	Name	Height	Weight	Year	Previous school	Hometown
G	0	Ebrima Dibba	6 ft 6 in (1.98 m)	214 lb (97 kg)	GS	St. Benedict's Preparatory; Coastal Carolina	Bredäng, Sweden
G	1	Jacobi Wright	6 ft 2 in (1.88 m)	182 lb (83 kg)	Jr	Legacy Early College	Fort Mill, SC
F/C	2	B.J. Mack	6 ft 8 in (2.03 m)	270 lb (122 kg)	GS	Oak Hill Academy; Wofford	Charlotte, NC
F	4	Stephen Clark	6 ft 8 in (2.03 m)	208 lb (94 kg)	GS	Metrolina Christian Academy; The Citadel	Charlotte, NC
G	5	Meechie Johnson	6 ft 2 in (1.88 m)	184 lb (83 kg)	RS Jr	Garfield Heights HS; Ohio State	Cleveland, OH
F	10	Myles Stute	6 ft 6 in (1.98 m)	209 lb (95 kg)	Sr	Gonzaga College HS; Vanderbilt	Washington, D.C.
G	12	Zachary Davis	6 ft 7 in (2.01 m)	194 lb (88 kg)	So	Denmark-Olar HS	Denmark, SC
G	13	Austin Herro (W)	6 ft 1 in (1.85 m)	—	Fr	Whitenall HS	Milwaukee, WI
G	14	Eli Sparkman (W)	6 ft 0 in (1.83 m)	160 lb (73 kg)	So	Baylor School	Cleveland, TN
G	15	Morris Ugusuk	6 ft 4 in (1.93 m)	—	Fr	Omnia Basketball Academy	Helsinki, Finland
G	20	Danny Grajzl (W)	6 ft 0 in (1.83 m)	175 lb (79 kg)	Fr	Hawken School	Cleveland, OH
G	21	Arden Conyers	6 ft 7 in (2.01 m)	204 lb (93 kg)	Fr	Westwood HS	Columbia, SC
F	30	Collin Murray-Boyles	6 ft 7 in (2.01 m)	231 lb (105 kg)	Fr	Wasatch Academy	Columbia, SC
F	31	Benjamin Bosmans-Verdonk	6 ft 8 in (2.03 m)	238 lb (108 kg)	RS Sr	KA Pegasus; Illinois	Lommel, Belgium
C	33	Josh Gray	7 ft 0 in (2.13 m)	265 lb (120 kg)	Sr	Putnam Science Academy; LSU	Brooklyn, NY
G	55	Ta'Lon Cooper	6 ft 4 in (1.93 m)	200 lb (91 kg)	Sr	Dorman HS; Minnesota	Roebuck, SC

Head coach

- Lamont Paris (Wooster)

Assistant coach(es)

- Tanner Bronson (Wisconsin)
- Tim Buckley (Bemidji State)
- Eddie Shannon (Florida)

Legend

- (C) Team captain
- (S) Suspended
- (I) Ineligible
- (W) Walk-on
- Injured
- Current redshirt

Roster

== Schedule and results ==
Date time, TV	Rank^{#}	Opponent^{#}	Result	Record	High points	High rebounds	High assists	Site (attendance) city, state
Exhibition
November 1, 2023*; 7:00 p.m., −		Wofford	W 60–57	−	14 – Mack	11 – Stute	4 – Johnson	Colonial Life Arena (2); Columbia, SC
Non-conference regular season
November 6, 2023*; 7:00 p.m., SECN+/ESPN+		USC Upstate	W 82–53	1–0	15 – Tied	8 – Davis	3 – Tied	Colonial Life Arena (11,216); Columbia, SC
November 10, 2023*; 9:30 p.m., ACCN		vs. Virginia Tech; He Gets Us Hall of Fame Series	W 79–77	2–0	21 – Stute	7 – Bosmans-Verdonk	7 – Cooper	Spectrum Center (6,783); Charlotte, NC
November 13, 2023*; 7:00 p.m., SECN+/ESPN+		VMI; Arizona Tip-Off campus site game	W 74–64	3–0	17 – Mack	13 – Mack	7 – Cooper	Colonial Life Arena (10,449); Columbia, SC
November 18, 2023*; 12:00 a.m., CBSSN		vs. DePaul; Arizona Tip-Off semifinals	W 73–68	4–0	24 – Johnson	7 – Tied	5 – Cooper	Desert Diamond Arena (3,214); Glendale, AZ
November 19, 2023*; 7:00 p.m., CBSSN		vs. Grand Canyon; Arizona Tip-Off championship game	W 75–68	5–0	27 – Mack	6 – Johnson	5 – Cooper	Desert Diamond Arena (2,589); Glendale, AZ
November 28, 2023*; 7:00 p.m., SECN		Notre Dame; ACC–SEC Challenge	W 65–53	6–0	29 – Johnson	5 – Tied	4 – Cooper	Colonial Life Arena (15,215); Columbia, SC
December 1, 2023*; 7:00 p.m., SECN+/ESPN+		George Washington	W 89–67	7–0	24 – Johnson	8 – Johnson	8 – Cooper	Colonial Life Arena (10,936); Columbia, SC
December 6, 2023*; 8:00 p.m., ACCN		at No. 24 Clemson; Rivalry	L 67–72	7–1	26 – Johnson	7 – Mack	4 – Johnson	Littlejohn Coliseum (9,000); Clemson, SC
December 9, 2023*; 12:00 p.m., ESPNU		at East Carolina	W 68–62	8–1	15 – Tied	8 – Mack	3 – Tied	Williams Arena (5,568); Greenville, NC
December 16, 2023*; 6:00 p.m., SECN+/ESPN+		Charleston Southern	W 73–69	9–1	16 – Mack	6 – Tied	5 – Ugusuk	Colonial Life Arena (10,006); Columbia, SC
December 19, 2023*; 7:00 p.m., SECN+/ESPN+		Winthrop	W 72–62	10–1	20 – Johnson	7 – Mack	5 – Johnson	Colonial Life Arena (9,455); Columbia, SC
December 22, 2023*; 6:00 p.m., SECN		Elon	W 70–43	11–1	17 – Cooper	8 – Stute	3 – Tied	Colonial Life Arena (10,203); Columbia, SC
December 30, 2023*; 2:00 p.m., SECN+/ESPN+		Florida A&M	W 94–62	12–1	17 – Murray-Boyles	9 – Clark	6 – Johnson	Colonial Life Arena (11,070); Columbia, SC
SEC regular season
January 6, 2024; 12:00 p.m., CBS		Mississippi State	W 68–62	13–1 (1–0)	24 – Johnson	6 – Tied	7 – Cooper	Colonial Life Arena (11,382); Columbia, SC
January 9, 2024; 7:00 p.m., SECN		at Alabama	L 47–74	13–2 (1–1)	16 – Johnson	6 – Mack	2 – Tied	Coleman Coliseum (10,208); Tuscaloosa, AL
January 13, 2024; 3:30 p.m., SECN		at Missouri	W 71–69 ^{OT}	14–2 (2–1)	21 – Mack	8 – Cooper	3 – Tied	Mizzou Arena (11,135); Columbia, MO
January 16, 2024; 9:00 p.m., ESPNU		Georgia	L 69–74	14–3 (2–2)	19 – Johnson	6 – Tied	3 – Tied	Colonial Life Arena (12,404); Columbia, SC
January 20, 2024; 1:00 p.m., SECN		at Arkansas	W 77–64	15–3 (3–2)	18 – Mack	9 – Mack	5 – Tied	Bud Walton Arena (19,200); Fayetteville, AR
January 23, 2024; 7:00 p.m., SECN		No. 6 Kentucky	W 79–62	16–3 (4–2)	20 – Cooper	9 – Murray-Boyles	5 – Tied	Colonial Life Arena (18,000); Columbia, SC
January 27, 2024; 1:00 p.m., SECN		Missouri	W 72–64	17–3 (5–2)	21 – Mack	8 – Murray-Boyles	4 – Cooper	Colonial Life Arena (13,553); Columbia, SC
January 30, 2024; 6:30 p.m., SECN		at No. 5 Tennessee	W 63–59	18–3 (6–2)	18 – Cooper	7 – Gray	6 – Johnson	Thompson–Boling Arena (20,667); Knoxville, TN
February 3, 2024; 1:00 p.m., SECN		at Georgia	W 72–62	19–3 (7–2)	16 – Murray-Boyles	8 – Gray	8 – Cooper	Stegeman Coliseum (10,523); Athens, GA
February 6, 2024; 6:30 p.m., SECN	No. 15	Ole Miss	W 68–65	20–3 (8–2)	16 – Murray-Boyles	9 – Murray-Boyles	8 – Johnson	Colonial Life Arena (18,000); Columbia, SC
February 10, 2024; 1:00 p.m., SECN	No. 15	Vanderbilt	W 75–60	21–3 (9–2)	31 – Murray-Boyles	7 – Murray-Boyles	7 – Cooper	Colonial Life Arena (14,310); Columbia, SC
February 14, 2024; 8:30 p.m., SECN	No. 11	at No. 13 Auburn	L 61–101	21–4 (9–3)	22 – Johnson	7 – Tied	2 – Johnson	Neville Arena (9,121); Auburn, AL
February 17, 2024; 3:30 p.m., SECN	No. 11	LSU	L 63–64	21–5 (9–4)	18 – Mack	9 – Mack	4 – Johnson	Colonial Life Arena (16,570); Columbia, SC
February 24, 2024; 3:30 p.m., SECN	No. 20	at Ole Miss	W 72–59	22–5 (10–4)	17 – Mack	9 – Davis	6 – Cooper	SJB Pavilion (8,486); Oxford, MS
February 28, 2024; 8:30 p.m., SECN	No. 18	at Texas A&M	W 70–68	23–5 (11–4)	22 – Johnson	12 – Murray-Boyles	9 – Cooper	Reed Arena (9,255); College Station, TX
March 2, 2024; 12:00 p.m., ESPN	No. 18	No. 24 Florida	W 82–76	24–5 (12–4)	25 – Johnson	11 – Murray-Boyles	4 – Cooper	Colonial Life Arena (16,978); Columbia, SC
March 6, 2024; 7:00 p.m., ESPN2	No. 17	No. 4 Tennessee	L 59–66	24–6 (12–5)	18 – Johnson	11 – Murray-Boyles	3 – Johnson	Colonial Life Arena (18,000); Columbia, SC
March 9, 2024; 2:30 p.m., SECN	No. 17	at Mississippi State	W 93–89 ^{OT}	25–6 (13–5)	25 – Mack	8 – Murray-Boyles	6 – Murray-Boyles	Humphrey Coliseum (9,289); Starkville, MS
SEC tournament
March 14, 2024; 3:30 p.m., SECN	(5) No. 15	vs. (12) Arkansas; Second Round	W 80–66	26–6	24 – Murray-Boyles	9 – Mack	4 – Davis	Bridgestone Arena (11,638); Nashville, TN
March 15, 2024; 3:30 p.m., ESPN	(5) No. 15	vs. (4) No. 12 Auburn; Quarterfinals	L 55–86	26–7	14 – Mack	8 – Tied	4 – Davis	Bridgestone Arena (17,137); Nashville, TN
NCAA tournament
March 21, 2024; 4:00 p.m., TBS	(6 MW) No. 16	vs. (11 MW) Oregon; First Round	L 73–87	26–8	24 – Johnson	8 – Stute	7 – Cooper	PPG Paints Arena (17,698); Pittsburgh, PA
*Non-conference game. ^{#}Rankings from AP Poll. (#) Tournament seedings in parentheses. MW=Midwest region. All times are in Eastern Time.

== Rankings ==
Ranking movements Legend: ██ Increase in ranking ██ Decrease in ranking — = Not ranked RV = Received votes
	Week																				
Poll	Pre	1	2	3	4	5	6	7	8	9	10	11	12	13	14	15	16	17	18	19	Final
AP	—	—	RV	RV	RV	RV	RV	RV	RV	RV	RV	—	RV	15	11	20	18	17	15	16	25
Coaches	—	—	RV	—	—	—	RV	RV	—	RV	—	—	RV	20	11	20	18	16	19	17	23

== See also ==
- 2023–24 South Carolina Gamecocks women's basketball team
