= 2023–24 Mississippi State Bulldogs men's basketball team =

American college basketball season

2023–24 Mississippi State Bulldogs men's basketball

Hall of Fame Tip-Off champions

NCAA tournament, First Round
- Conference: Southeastern Conference
- Record: 21–14 (8–10 SEC)
- Head coach: Chris Jans (2nd season)
- Assistant coaches: James Miller; David Anwar; George Brooks
- Home arena: Humphrey Coliseum

2023–24 Southeastern Conference men's basketball standings
	Conf.				Overall
Team	W		L	PCT	W		L	PCT
No. 5 Tennessee	14	–	4	.778	27	–	9	.750
No. 20 Kentucky	13	–	5	.722	23	–	10	.697
No. 3т Alabama	13	–	5	.722	25	–	12	.676
No. 18 Auburn †	13	–	5	.722	27	–	8	.771
No. 25 South Carolina	13	–	5	.722	26	–	8	.765
Florida	11	–	7	.611	24	–	12	.667
Texas A&M	9	–	9	.500	21	–	15	.583
LSU	9	–	9	.500	17	–	16	.515
Mississippi State	8	–	10	.444	21	–	14	.600
Ole Miss	7	–	11	.389	20	–	12	.625
Georgia	6	–	12	.333	20	–	17	.541
Arkansas	6	–	12	.333	16	–	17	.485
Vanderbilt	4	–	14	.222	9	–	23	.281
Missouri	0	–	18	.000	8	–	24	.250
† 2024 SEC tournament winner Rankings from AP poll

The 2023–24 Mississippi State Bulldogs men's basketball team represented Mississippi State University during the 2023–24 NCAA Division I men's basketball season. The Bulldogs were led by second-year head coach Chris Jans, and played their home games at Humphrey Coliseum in Mississippi State, Mississippi, just outside Starkville, as a member of the Southeastern Conference.

== Previous season ==
The Bulldogs finished the 2022–23 season 20–11, 8–10 in SEC play to tie for 9th place. They defeated Florida in the second round of the SEC tournament before losing to Alabama in the quarterfinals. They received an at-large bid to the NCAA Tournament as an 11th seed, where they lost in the First Four play-in round to Pittsburgh.

== Offseason ==
=== Departures ===
Name	Number	Pos.	Height	Weight	Year	Hometown	Reason for departure
Jamel Horton	2	G	6'3"	190	GS Senior	Queens, NY	Graduated
Kimani Hamilton	5	F	6'7"	210	Freshman	Clinton, MS	Transferred to High Point
Eric Reed Jr.	11	G	6'2"	195	Senior	Baton Rouge, LA	Graduated
Will McNair Jr.	13	F	6'11"	265	Junior	Philadelphia, PA	Transferred to Kansas State
Tyler Stevenson	14	F	6'8"	215	Senior	Columbus, MS	Graduated
Justin Rumph	15	G	6'5"	225	GS Senior	Birmingham, AL	Walk-on; graduated
Tyler Brumfield	24	G	6'2"	180	Sophomore	Los Angeles, CA	Walk-on; transferred

=== Incoming transfers ===
Name	Number	Pos.	Height	Weight	Year	Hometown	Previous School
Lorenzo Fort III	11	G	6'4"	195	Junior	Jackson, MS	Howard College
Jimmy Bell Jr.	15	F	6'10"	295	GS Senior	Saginaw, MI	West Virginia
Jaquan Scott	22	F	6'8"	210	Junior	Dallas, TX	Salt Lake CC
Andrew Taylor	23	G	6'3"	194	GS Senior	Corbin, KY	Marshall

=== 2023 recruiting class ===
College recruiting information
Name	Hometown	School	Height	Weight	Commit date
Josh Hubbard #24 PG	Ridgeland, MS	Madison-Ridgeland Academy	5 ft 11 in (1.80 m)	175 lb (79 kg)	Mar 13, 2023
Josh Hubbard #24 PG	Recruit ratings: Rivals: 247Sports: ESPN: (83)				
Gai Chol #43 C	Decatur, GA	Greenforest Christian Academy	6 ft 10 in (2.08 m)	215 lb (98 kg)	Jul 9, 2022
Gai Chol #43 C	Recruit ratings: Rivals: 247Sports: ESPN: (81)				
Adrian Myers; SF	Woodstock, VA	Massanutten Military Academy	6 ft 7 in (2.01 m)	185 lb (84 kg)	Oct 18, 2022
Adrian Myers; SF	Recruit ratings: Rivals: 247Sports: ESPN: (NR)				
Overall recruit ranking:
Note: In many cases, Scout, Rivals, 247Sports, On3, and ESPN may conflict in their listings of height and weight.; In these cases, the average was taken. ESPN grades are on a 100-point scale.; Sources: "Mississippi State 2023 Basketball Commitments". Rivals.; "2023 Mississippi State Basketball Commits". Scout.; "ESPN". ESPN.; "Scout.com Team Recruiting Rankings". Scout.; "2023 Team Ranking". Rivals.

=== 2024 recruiting class ===
College recruiting information (2024)
Name	Hometown	School	Height	Weight	Commit date
Dellquan Warren #24 PG	Erie, PA	Keystone Academy	6 ft 1 in (1.85 m)	170 lb (77 kg)	Jul 9, 2022
Dellquan Warren #24 PG	Recruit ratings: Rivals: 247Sports: ESPN: (85)				
Overall recruit ranking:
Note: In many cases, Scout, Rivals, 247Sports, On3, and ESPN may conflict in their listings of height and weight.; In these cases, the average was taken. ESPN grades are on a 100-point scale.; Sources: "Mississippi State 2024 Basketball Commitments". Rivals.; "2024 Mississippi State Basketball Commits". Scout.; "ESPN". ESPN.; "Scout.com Team Recruiting Rankings". Scout.; "2024 Team Ranking". Rivals.

== Roster ==
2023–24 Mississippi State Bulldogs men's basketball team
Players
Coaches

Pos.	#	Name	Height	Weight	Year	Previous school	Hometown
F	0	D. J. Jeffries	6 ft 7 in (2.01 m)	215 lb (98 kg)	GS	Memphis	Olive Branch, MS
F	1	Tolu Smith	6 ft 11 in (2.11 m)	245 lb (111 kg)	GS	Western Kentucky	Bay St. Louis, MS
F	2	Adrian Myers	6 ft 6 in (1.98 m)	205 lb (93 kg)	Fr	Massanutten Military Academy	Stephens City, VA
G	3	Shakeel Moore	6 ft 1 in (1.85 m)	190 lb (86 kg)	Sr	NC State	Greensboro, NC
F	4	Cameron Matthews	6 ft 7 in (2.01 m)	230 lb (104 kg)	Sr	Olive Branch HS	Olive Branch, MS
G	5	Shawn Jones Jr. (W)	6 ft 5 in (1.96 m)	205 lb (93 kg)	So	Shadow Creek HS	Houston, TX
G	10	Dashawn Davis	6 ft 2 in (1.88 m)	190 lb (86 kg)	GS	Oregon State	Bronx, NY
G	11	Trey Fort	6 ft 4 in (1.93 m)	195 lb (88 kg)	Jr	Howard College	Jackson, MS
F	12	KeShawn Murphy	6 ft 10 in (2.08 m)	235 lb (107 kg)	RS So	Ramsey	Birmingham, AL
G	13	Josh Hubbard	5 ft 10 in (1.78 m)	185 lb (84 kg)	Fr	Madison-Ridgeland Academy	Madison, MS
F	15	Jimmy Bell Jr.	6 ft 10 in (2.08 m)	280 lb (127 kg)	GS	West Virginia	Saginaw, MI
G	20	Harrison Alexander (W)	6 ft 4 in (1.93 m)	190 lb (86 kg)	Fr	Madison-Ridgeland Academy	Madison, MS
G	21	Martavious Russell	6 ft 2 in (1.88 m)	190 lb (86 kg)	So	Sipsey Valley HS	Coker, AL
F	22	Jaquan Scott	6 ft 8 in (2.03 m)	230 lb (104 kg)	Jr	Salt Lake CC	Dallas, TX
G	23	Andrew Taylor	6 ft 3 in (1.91 m)	195 lb (88 kg)	GS	Marshall	Corbin, KY
G	25	Isaac Stansbury (W)	6 ft 1 in (1.85 m)	170 lb (77 kg)	GS	Greenwood HS	Bowling Green, KY
C	34	Gai Chol	6 ft 11 in (2.11 m)	245 lb (111 kg)	Fr	Greenforest McCalep Christian Academy (GA)	Juba, South Sudan
G	40	Trey Jackson III (W)	6 ft 2 in (1.88 m)	200 lb (91 kg)	RS Jr	Mississippi for Women	Starkville, MS

Head coach

- Chris Jans (Loras)

Assistant coach(es)

- James Miller (CSU Pueblo)
- David Anwar (Fitchburg State)
- George Brooks (Mississippi State)

Legend

- (C) Team captain
- (S) Suspended
- (I) Ineligible
- (W) Walk-on
- Injured
- Current redshirt

Roster

== Schedule and results ==
Date time, TV	Rank^{#}	Opponent^{#}	Result	Record	High points	High rebounds	High assists	Site (attendance) city, state
Exhibition
October 29, 2023*; 2:00 p.m., –		at Southern Miss; Charity Exhibition Game	W 60–54		–	–	–	Reed Green Coliseum; Hattiesburg, MS
Non-conference regular season
November 8, 2023*; 8:30 p.m., Barstool.TV		vs. Arizona State; Barstool Sports Invitational	W 71–56	1–0	21 – Fort	9 – Tied	3 – Taylor	Wintrust Arena (5,361); Chicago, IL
November 11, 2023*; 4:00 p.m., SECN+/ESPN+		UT Martin	W 87–63	2–0	22 – Hubbard	12 – Bell Jr.	4 – Davis	Humphrey Coliseum (7,525); Starkville, MS
November 14, 2023*; 6:30 p.m., SECN+/ESPN+		North Alabama	W 81–54	3–0	14 – Bell Jr.	14 – Bell Jr.	4 – 3 tied	Humphrey Coliseum (7,337); Starkville, MS
November 18, 2023*; 11:00 a.m., ESPN+		vs. Washington State; Hall of Fame Tip-Off semifinals	W 76–64	4–0	13 – 2 tied	8 – Bell Jr.	4 – Davis	Mohegan Sun Arena (–); Uncasville, CT
November 19, 2023*; 12:00 p.m., ESPN2		vs. Northwestern; Hall of Fame Tip-Off championship	W 66–57	5–0	29 – Hubbard	10 – Jeffries	4 – Matthews	Mohegan Sun Arena (–); Uncasville, CT
November 24, 2023*; 1:00 p.m., SECN+/ESPN+	No. 25	Nicholls	W 74–61	6–0	15 – Hubbard	10 – Bell Jr.	4 – Davis	Humphrey Coliseum (7,561); Starkville, MS
November 28, 2023*; 6:00 p.m., ACCN	No. 21	at Georgia Tech; ACC–SEC Challenge	L 59–67	6–1	17 – Hubbard	13 – Bell Jr.	2 – Bell Jr.	McCamish Pavilion (3,913); Atlanta, GA
December 3, 2023*; 3:00 p.m., SECN	No. 21	Southern	L 59–60	6–2	14 – Hubbard	13 – Bell Jr.	4 – Moore	Humphrey Coliseum (7,186); Starkville, MS
December 9, 2023*; 10:30 a.m., SECN		vs. Tulane; Holiday Hoopsgiving	W 106–76	7–2	22 – Hubbard	10 – Murphy	7 – Jeffries	State Farm Arena (–); Atlanta, GA
December 13, 2023*; 6:30 p.m., SECN+/ESPN+		Murray State	W 85–81	8–2	16 – Moore	12 – Jeffries	5 – Davis	Humphrey Coliseum (6,804); Starkville, MS
December 17, 2023*; 3:00 p.m., SECN+/ESPN+		vs. North Texas	W 72–54	9–2	18 – Murphy	12 – Matthews	7 – Matthews	Cadence Bank Arena (2,662); Tupelo, MS
December 23, 2023*; 11:00 a.m., BTN		vs. Rutgers; Gotham Classic	W 70–60	10–2	18 – Matthews	18 – Bell Jr.	7 – Davis	Prudential Center (5,169); Newark, NJ
December 31, 2023*; 2:00 p.m., SECN+/ESPN+		Bethune–Cookman	W 85–62	11–2	16 – Smith	9 – Smith	6 – Matthews	Humphrey Coliseum (7,035); Starkville, MS
SEC regular season
January 6, 2024; 11:00 a.m., CBS		at South Carolina	L 62–68	11–3 (0–1)	13 – Tied	5 – Tied	3 – Jeffries	Colonial Life Arena (11,382); Columbia, SC
January 10, 2024; 6:00 p.m., SECN		No. 5 Tennessee	W 77–72	12–3 (1–1)	25 – Hubbard	6 – Jeffries	4 – Davis	Humphrey Coliseum (8,160); Starkville, MS
January 13, 2024; 7:30 p.m., SECN		Alabama	L 74–82	12–4 (1–2)	15 – Smith	10 – Smith	3 – Tied	Humphrey Coliseum (9,142); Starkville, MS
January 17, 2024; 6:00 p.m., ESPN2		at No. 8 Kentucky	L 77–90	12–5 (1–3)	26 – Smith	8 – Tied	6 – Matthews	Rupp Arena (20,016); Lexington, KY
January 20, 2024; 2:30 p.m., SECN		Vanderbilt	W 68–55	13–5 (2–3)	25 – Smith	11 – Smith	3 – Tied	Humphrey Coliseum (9,172); Starkville, MS
January 24, 2024; 7:30 p.m., SECN		at Florida	L 70–79	13–6 (2–4)	26 – Hubbard	11 – Matthews	4 – Davis	O'Connell Center (8,484); Gainesville, FL
January 27, 2024; 2:30 p.m., SECN		No. 8 Auburn	W 64–58	14–6 (3–4)	17 – Hubbard	12 – Jeffries	3 – Smith	Humphrey Coliseum (9,175); Starkville, MS
January 30, 2024; 7:30 p.m., SECN		at Ole Miss	L 82–86	14–7 (3–5)	21 – Hubbard	12 – Matthews	7 – Hubbard	SJB Pavilion (10,630); Oxford, MS
February 3, 2024; 7:30 p.m., SECN		at No. 24 Alabama	L 67–99	14–8 (3–6)	23 – Smith	6 – Tied	3 – Tied	Coleman Coliseum (13,474); Tuscaloosa, AL
February 7, 2024; 8:00 p.m., SECN		Georgia	W 75–62	15–8 (4–6)	19 – Smith	12 – Smith	8 – Davis	Humphrey Coliseum (8,755); Starkville, MS
February 10, 2024; 7:30 p.m., SECN		at Missouri	W 75–51	16–8 (5–6)	16 – Hubbard	11 – Smith	4 – Matthews	Mizzou Arena (10,620); Columbia, MO
February 17, 2024; 1:00 p.m., ESPNU		Arkansas	W 71–67	17–8 (6–6)	19 – Hubbard	10 – Matthews	3 – Tied	Humphrey Coliseum (9,219); Starkville, MS
February 21, 2024; 8:00 p.m., ESPN2		Ole Miss	W 83–71	18–8 (7–6)	24 – Smith	6 – Tied	3 – Tied	Humphrey Coliseum (9,381); Starkville, MS
February 24, 2024; 7:30 p.m., SECN		at LSU	W 87–67	19–8 (8–6)	32 – Hubbard	9 – Tied	3 – Tied	Pete Maravich Assembly Center (9,463); Baton Rouge, LA
February 27, 2024; 6:00 p.m., ESPN		No. 16 Kentucky	L 89–91	19–9 (8–7)	34 – Hubbard	10 – Smith	6 – Matthews	Humphrey Coliseum (9,266); Starkville, MS
March 2, 2024; 3:00 p.m., ESPN2		at No. 11 Auburn	L 63–78	19–10 (8–8)	23 – Hubbard	10 – Tied	3 – Tied	Neville Arena (9,121); Auburn, AL
March 6, 2024; 8:00 p.m., ESPNU		at Texas A&M	L 69–75	19–11 (8–9)	24 – Hubbard	12 – Jeffries	4 – Tied	Reed Arena (8,163); College Station, TX
March 9, 2024; 1:30 p.m., SECN		No. 17 South Carolina	L 89–93 ^{OT}	19–12 (8–10)	28 – Hubbard	11 – Matthews	4 – Matthews	Humphrey Coliseum (9,289); Starkville, MS
SEC tournament
March 14, 2024; 12:00 p.m., SECN	(9)	vs. (8) LSU; Second round	W 70–60	20–12	24 – Hubbard	13 – Smith	3 – Tied	Bridgestone Arena (11,638); Nashville, TN
March 15, 2024; 12:00 p.m., ESPN	(9)	vs. (1) No. 5 Tennessee; Quarterfinals	W 73–56	21–12	18 – Tied	8 – Matthews	3 – Tied	Bridgestone Arena (17,137); Nashville, TN
March 16, 2024; 12:00 p.m., ESPN	(9)	vs. (4) No. 12 Auburn; Semifinals	L 66–73	21–13	20 – Hubbard	10 – Smith	3 – Matthews	Bridgestone Arena (16,499); Nashville, TN
NCAA tournament
March 21, 2024; 11:15 a.m., CBS	(8 W)	vs. (9 W) Michigan State; First Round	L 51–69	21–14	15 – Hubbard	5 – Matthews	3 – Davis	Spectrum Center; Charlotte, NC
*Non-conference game. ^{#}Rankings from AP Poll. (#) Tournament seedings in parentheses. All times are in Central Time.

== Rankings ==
Ranking movements Legend: ██ Increase in ranking ██ Decrease in ranking — = Not ranked RV = Received votes
	Week																				
Poll	Pre	1	2	3	4	5	6	7	8	9	10	11	12	13	14	15	16	17	18	19	Final
AP	RV	RV	25	21	—	—	RV	RV	RV	RV	—	RV	—	—	—	—	—	—	—	RV	—
Coaches	RV	RV	25	22	RV	—	—	—	—	—	—	—	—	—	—	—	—	—	—	—	—
