= Win Case =

American collegiate basketball coach (born 1963)

Current position
- Title: Associate head coach
- Team: Southern Miss
- Conference: Sun Belt

Biographical details
- Born: July 15, 1963 (age 63); Tulsa, Oklahoma, U.S.
- Education: University of Science and Arts of Oklahoma (BA)

Playing career
- 1981–1983: Seminole JC
- 1983–1985: Oklahoma State
- Position: Guard

Coaching career (HC unless noted)
- 1987–1988: Oklahoma Baptist (assistant)
- 1988–1989: Eastern Oklahoma State (assistant)
- 1989–1994: Oklahoma City (assistant)
- 1994–2006: Oklahoma City
- 2006–2007: Eastern Oklahoma State
- 2007–2008: Redlands CC
- 2008–2018: Middle Tennessee (assistant)
- 2018–2023: Ole Miss (assistant)
- 2023: Ole Miss (interim HC)
- 2023–2025: Ole Miss (special asst. to HC)
- 2025–present: Southern Miss (assoc. head coach)

Administrative career (AD unless noted)
- 2006–2007: Eastern Oklahoma State
- 2007–2008: Redlands CC

Head coaching record
- Overall: 393–170 (.698)

Accomplishments and honors

Championships
- 2 NAIA (1994, 1996)

Win Case (born July 15, 1963) is an American basketball coach and former player. He was most recently the interim head coach of the Ole Miss Rebels men's basketball team between the firing of Kermit Davis and hiring of Chris Beard. He served as an assistant for Kermit Davis prior to his firing on February 24, 2023.

== Head coaching record ==
Record table
Season	Team	Overall	Conference	Standing	Postseason
Oklahoma City Chiefs / Stars (Sooner Athletic Conference) (1994–2006)
1992–93	Oklahoma City	25–7			NAIA Second round
1993–94	Oklahoma City	28–7			NAIA Champions
1994–95	Oklahoma City	30–3		1st	NAIA Elite Eight
1995–96	Oklahoma City	32–6	–	1st	NAIA Champions
1996–97	Oklahoma City	19–8			
1997–98	Oklahoma City	26–5			NAIA Second Round
1998–99	Oklahoma City	26–7		T–1st	NAIA Second Round
1999–2000	Oklahoma City	26–5		1st	NAIA Second Round
2000–01	Oklahoma City	19–7			NAIA Second Round
2001–02	Oklahoma City	26–7		1st	NAIA Elite Eight
2002–03	Oklahoma City	18–11			NAIA First Round
2003–04	Oklahoma City	20–12			NAIA Elite Eight
2004–05	Oklahoma City	20–12			NAIA Second Round
Oklahoma City:		343–127 (.730)	–		
Ole Miss Rebels (Southeastern Conference) (2023–present)
2022–23	Ole Miss	2–3	1–2	13th	
Ole Miss:		2–3 (.400)	1–2 (.333)		
Total:		393–172 (.696)			
National champion Postseason invitational champion Conference regular season champion Conference regular season and conference tournament champion Division regular season champion Division regular season and conference tournament champion Conference tournament champion
