= 2024 SEC men's basketball tournament =

American college basketball postseason tournament

- Classification: Division I
- Season: 2023–24
- Teams: 14
- Site: Bridgestone Arena; Nashville, Tennessee
- Champions: Auburn (3rd title)
- Winning coach: Bruce Pearl (2nd title)
- MVP: Johni Broome (Auburn)
- Attendance: 112,300 (total); 18,532 (championship)
- Television: SEC Network, ESPN

2023–24 Southeastern Conference men's basketball standings
	Conf.				Overall
Team	W		L	PCT	W		L	PCT
No. 5 Tennessee	14	–	4	.778	27	–	9	.750
No. 20 Kentucky	13	–	5	.722	23	–	10	.697
No. 3т Alabama	13	–	5	.722	25	–	12	.676
No. 18 Auburn †	13	–	5	.722	27	–	8	.771
No. 25 South Carolina	13	–	5	.722	26	–	8	.765
Florida	11	–	7	.611	24	–	12	.667
Texas A&M	9	–	9	.500	21	–	15	.583
LSU	9	–	9	.500	17	–	16	.515
Mississippi State	8	–	10	.444	21	–	14	.600
Ole Miss	7	–	11	.389	20	–	12	.625
Georgia	6	–	12	.333	20	–	17	.541
Arkansas	6	–	12	.333	16	–	17	.485
Vanderbilt	4	–	14	.222	9	–	23	.281
Missouri	0	–	18	.000	8	–	24	.250
† 2024 SEC tournament winner Rankings from AP poll

The 2024 Southeastern Conference men's basketball tournament was a postseason men's basketball tournament for the Southeastern Conference held at Bridgestone Arena in Nashville, Tennessee, from March 13 through 17, 2024. Auburn defeated Florida, 86–67, in the championship game to earn an automatic bid to the 2024 NCAA Division I men's basketball tournament.

== Seeds ==
Seed	School	Conference record	Tiebreaker
1	Tennessee	14–4	
2	Kentucky	13–5	2–1 vs. Alabama, Auburn, South Carolina
3	Alabama	13–5	2–2 vs. Auburn, Kentucky, South Carolina, 1–1 vs. Florida
4	Auburn	13–5	2–2 vs. Alabama, Kentucky, South Carolina, 0–1 vs. Florida
5	South Carolina	13–5	1–2 vs. Alabama, Auburn, Kentucky
6	Florida	11–7	
7	Texas A&M	9–9	1–1 vs. LSU, 1–1 vs. Tennessee
8	LSU	9–9	1–1 vs. Texas A&M, 0–1 vs. Tennessee
9	Mississippi State	8–10	
10	Ole Miss	7–11	
11	Georgia	6–12	1–1 vs. Arkansas, 1–1 vs. South Carolina
12	Arkansas	6–12	1–1 vs. Georgia, 0–1 vs. South Carolina
13	Vanderbilt	4–14	
14	Missouri	0–18	

== Schedule ==
Game	Time*	Matchup^{#}	Score	Television	Attendance
First round – Wednesday, March 13
1	6:00 pm	No. 12 Arkansas vs. No. 13 Vanderbilt	90–85^{OT}	SEC Network	16,539
2	8:30 pm	No. 11 Georgia vs. No. 14 Missouri	64–59	SEC Network	16,539
Second round – Thursday, March 14
3	12:00 pm	No. 8 LSU vs. No. 9 Mississippi State	70–60	SEC Network	11,638
4	2:30 pm	No. 5 South Carolina vs. No. 12 Arkansas	80–66	SEC Network	11,638
5	6:00 pm	No. 7 Texas A&M vs. No. 10 Ole Miss	80–71	SEC Network	13,771
6	8:30 pm	No. 6 Florida vs. No. 11 Georgia	85–80	SEC Network	13,771
Quarterfinals – Friday, March 15
7	12:00 pm	No. 1 Tennessee vs. No. 9 Mississippi State	73–56	ESPN	17,137
8	2:30 pm	No. 4 Auburn vs. No. 5 South Carolina	86−55	ESPN	17,137
9	6:00 pm	No. 2 Kentucky vs. No. 7 Texas A&M	97–87	SEC Network	18,244
10	8:30 pm	No. 3 Alabama vs. No. 6 Florida	102–88	SEC Network	18,244
Semifinals – Saturday, March 16
11	12:00 pm	No. 9 Mississippi State vs. No. 4 Auburn	73–66	ESPN	16,499
12	2:30 pm	No. 7 Texas A&M vs. No. 6 Florida	95–90	ESPN	16,499
Championship – Sunday, March 17
13	12:00 pm	No. 4 Auburn vs. No. 6 Florida	86–67	ESPN	18,532
*Game times in CT. # – Rankings denote tournament seed

== Bracket ==
First round Wednesday, March 13; SEC Network
12	Arkansas	90
13	Vanderbilt	85^{OT}
11	Georgia	64
14	Missouri	59

Second round Thursday, March 14; SEC Network
8	LSU	60
9	Mississippi State	70
5	South Carolina	80
12	Arkansas	66
7	Texas A&M	80
10	Ole Miss	71
6	Florida	85
11	Georgia	80

Quarterfinals; Friday, March 15; ESPN/SEC Network
1	Tennessee	56
9	Mississippi State	73
4	Auburn	86
5	South Carolina	55
2	Kentucky	87
7	Texas A&M	97
3	Alabama	88
6	Florida	102

Semifinals; Saturday, March 16; ESPN
9	Mississippi State	66
4	Auburn	73
7	Texas A&M	90
6	Florida	95

Championship; Sunday, March 17; ESPN
4	Auburn	86
6	Florida	67

== Game summaries ==
=== First round ===
SECN

March 13
6:00 p.m.

Report

No. 12 Arkansas 90, No. 13 Vanderbilt 85 (OT)
Scoring by half: 27–41, 51–37 Overtime: 12–7
Pts: K. Battle, 24; Rebs: T. Brazile, 12; Asts: 3 tied, 3	Pts: E. Manjon, 29; Rebs: V. Lubin, 10; Asts: E. Manjon, 6

Bridgestone Arena
Nashville, TN
Attendance: 16,539
Referees: Terry Oglesby, Owen Shortt, Anthony Jordan

SECN

March 13
8:30 p.m.

Report

No. 11 Georgia 64, No. 14 Missouri 59
Scoring by half: 31–30, 33–29
Pts: B. Cain, 19; Rebs: R. Tchewa, 6 Asts: 3 tied, 3	Pts: N. Honor, 14; Rebs: C. Vanover, 10; Asts: S. East II, 5

Bridgestone Arena
Nashville, TN
Attendance: 16,539
Referees: Pat Adams, Todd Austin, Chuck Jones

=== Second round ===
SECN

March 14
12:00 p.m.

Report

No. 8 LSU 60, No. 9 Mississippi State 70
Scoring by half: 29–22, 31–48
Pts: T. Hannibal, 18; Rebs: J. Wright, 8 Asts: M. Williams III, 4	Pts: J. Hubbard, 24; Rebs: T. Smith III, 13; Asts: 2 tied, 2

Bridgestone Arena
Nashville, TN
Attendance: 11,638
Referees: Joe Lindsay, Bart Lenox, Todd Austin

SECN

March 14
2:30 p.m.

Report

No. 5 South Carolina 80, No. 12 Arkansas 66
Scoring by half: 38–35, 42–31
Pts: C. Murray-Boyles, 24; Rebs: B. Mack, 9 Asts: Z. Davis, 4	Pts: K. Battle, 20; Rebs: K. Battle, 7 Asts: J. Graham, 4

Bridgestone Arena
Nashville, TN
Attendance: 11,638
Referees: Don Daily, Olandis Poole, Vladimir Voyard-Tadal

SECN

March 14
6:00 p.m.

Report

No. 7 Texas A&M 80, No. 10 Ole Miss 71
Scoring by half: 35–31, 45–40
Pts: W. Taylor IV, 20; Rebs: A. Garcia, 14; Asts: W. Taylor IV, 4	Pts: J. Brakefield, 23; Rebs: 2 tied, 7 Asts: 2 tied, 5

Bridgestone Arena
Nashville, TN
Attendance: 13,711
Referees: K.B. Burdett Jr., Steven Anderson, Chuck Jones

SECN

March 14
8:30 p.m.

Report

No. 6 Florida 85, No. 11 Georgia 80
Scoring by half: 34–37, 51–43
Pts: W. Clayton Jr., 22; Rebs: T. Samuel, 15; Asts: Z. Pullin, 8	Pts: 2 tied, 14; Rebs: 4 tied, 4 Asts: 2 tied, 3

Bridgestone Arena
Nashville, TN
Attendance: 13,711
Referees: Doug Shows, Wil Howard, Byron Jarrett

=== Quarterfinals ===
ESPN

March 15
12:00 p.m.

Report

No. 1 Tennessee 56, No. 9 Mississippi State 73
Scoring by half: 19–38, 37–35
Pts: Z. Zeigler, 20; Rebs: J. Aidoo, 10; Asts: 2 tied, 4	Pts: 2 tied, 18; Rebs: C. Matthews, 8 Asts: 2 tied, 3

Bridgestone Arena
Nashville, TN
Attendance: 17,137
Referees: Pat Adams, K.B. Burdett Jr., Steven Anderson

ESPN

March 15
2:30 p.m.

Report

No. 4 Auburn 86, No. 5 South Carolina 55
Scoring by half: 46−26, 40−29
Pts: J. Broome, 18; Rebs: J. Broome, 10; Asts: T. Donaldson, 4	Pts: B. Mack, 14; Rebs: 3 tied, 8 Asts: Z. Davis, 3

Bridgestone Arena
Nashville, TN
Attendance: 17,137
Referees: Terry Oglesby, Bart Lenox, Byron Jarrett

SECN

March 15
6:00 p.m.

Report

No. 2 Kentucky 87, No. 7 Texas A&M 97
Scoring by half: 42–48, 45–49
Pts: R. Dillingham, 27; Rebs: T. Mitchell, 9 Asts: R. Dillingham, 7	Pts: W. Taylor IV, 32; Rebs: 3 tied, 7 Asts: T. Radford, 6

Bridgestone Arena
Nashville, TN
Attendance: 18,244
Referees: Doug Shows, Olandis Poole, Owen Shortt

SECN

March 15
8:30 p.m.

Report

No. 3 Alabama 88, No. 6 Florida 102
Scoring by half: 33–48, 55–54
Pts: M. Sears, 22; Rebs: N. Pringle, 10; Asts: A. Estrada, 6	Pts: W. Clayton Jr., 23; Rebs: T. Haugh, 9 Asts: W. Clayton Jr., 4

Bridgestone Arena
Nashville, TN
Attendance: 18,244
Referees: Don Daily, Joe Lindsay, Vladimir Voyard-Tadal

=== Semifinals ===
ESPN

March 16
12:00 p.m.

Report

No. 9 Mississippi State 66, No. 4 Auburn 73
Scoring by half: 31–31, 35–42
Pts: J. Hubbard, 20; Rebs: T. Smith III, 10; Asts: 2 tied, 3	Pts: C. Baker-Mazara, 14; Rebs: 3 tied, 4 Asts: A. Holloway, 6

Bridgestone Arena
Nashville, TN
Attendance: 16,499
Referees: Joe Lindsay, K.B. Burdett Jr., Byron Jarrett

ESPN

March 16
2:30 p.m.

Report

No. 7 Texas A&M 90, No. 6 Florida 95
Scoring by half: 50–42, 40–53
Pts: W. Taylor IV, 30; Rebs: S. Washington, 10; Asts: W. Taylor IV, 4	Pts: D. Aberdeen, 20; Rebs: A. Condon, 9 Asts: 2 tied, 5

Bridgestone Arena
Nashville, TN
Attendance: 16,499
Referees: Doug Shows, Bart Lenox, Steven Anderson

=== Championship ===
ESPN

March 17
12:00 p.m.

Report

No. 4 Auburn 86, No. 6 Florida 67
Scoring by half: 38–30, 48–37
Pts: J. Broome, 19; Rebs: J. Broome, 11; Asts: T. Donaldson, 4	Pts: Z. Pullin, 15; Rebs: 2 tied, 7 Asts: W. Clayton Jr., 3

Bridgestone Arena
Nashville, TN
Attendance: 18,532
Referees: Terry Oglesby, Don Daily, Pat Adams
