= Illinois Route 99 =

State highway in western Illinois, US

Illinois Route 99
- IL 99 highlighted in red

Route information
- Maintained by IDOT
- Length: 32.08 mi (51.63 km)
- Existed: 1936–present

Major junctions
- South end: IL 104 in Chambersburg
- US 24 in Mt. Sterling
- North end: IL 101 in Huntsville

Location
- Country: United States
- State: Illinois
- Counties: Pike, Brown, Schuyler

Highway system
- Illinois State Highway System; Interstate; US; State; Tollways; Scenic
← IL 98	→ IL 100

Illinois Route 99 is a north–south state route in western Illinois. It runs from Illinois Route 104 across the Illinois River and Meredosia, north to Illinois Route 101 in Brooklyn (Schuyler County). This is a distance of 32.08 miles (51.63 km).

== Route description ==
Illinois 99 runs northwest from Meredosia to Mount Sterling. It enters the Mount Sterling area on Pittsfield Road north of Illinois Route 107. It then overlaps U.S. Route 24 and runs west on Main Street. After about a half mile (.8 km), Illinois 99 then turns north on Cross Street, west on Washington Street, and then back north on Camden Road en route to Camden. Illinois 99 continues north (staying west of the LaMoine River) to Illinois 101 at Brooklyn, its northern termination.

== History ==
SBI Route 99 had been a route from West Point to Tennessee on local roads, IL 91, IL 61, and US 136. In 1935, IL 99 was dropped from those routes. In 1937, it replaced IL 104 on its current route; in March 1941, it was announced that IL 99 was extended north to Brooklyn.

== Major intersections ==
County	Location	mi	km	Destinations	Notes
Pike	Chambersburg	0.0	0.0	IL 104 – Jacksonville, Quincy	
Brown	Mt. Sterling	14.4	23.2	IL 107 south – Pittsfield	
Brown	Mt. Sterling	15.1	24.3	US 24 east – Rushville	South end of US 24 concurrency
Brown	Mt. Sterling	15.6	25.1	US 24 west – Quincy	North end of US 24 concurrency
Schuyler	Huntsville	32.08	51.63	IL 101 – Bowen	
1.000 mi = 1.609 km; 1.000 km = 0.621 mi: Concurrency terminus
