= 2023–24 Missouri Tigers men's basketball team =

American college basketball season

2023–24 Missouri Tigers men's basketball
- Conference: Southeastern Conference
- Record: 8–24 (0–18 SEC)
- Head coach: Dennis Gates (2nd season)
- Associate head coach: Charlton Young (2nd season)
- Assistant coaches: Dickey Nutt (2nd season); Kyle Smithpeters (2nd season); Ryan Sharbaugh (1st season); Matt Cline (1st season)
- Home arena: Mizzou Arena

2023–24 Southeastern Conference men's basketball standings
	Conf.				Overall
Team	W		L	PCT	W		L	PCT
No. 5 Tennessee	14	–	4	.778	27	–	9	.750
No. 20 Kentucky	13	–	5	.722	23	–	10	.697
No. 3т Alabama	13	–	5	.722	25	–	12	.676
No. 18 Auburn †	13	–	5	.722	27	–	8	.771
No. 25 South Carolina	13	–	5	.722	26	–	8	.765
Florida	11	–	7	.611	24	–	12	.667
Texas A&M	9	–	9	.500	21	–	15	.583
LSU	9	–	9	.500	17	–	16	.515
Mississippi State	8	–	10	.444	21	–	14	.600
Ole Miss	7	–	11	.389	20	–	12	.625
Georgia	6	–	12	.333	20	–	17	.541
Arkansas	6	–	12	.333	16	–	17	.485
Vanderbilt	4	–	14	.222	9	–	23	.281
Missouri	0	–	18	.000	8	–	24	.250
† 2024 SEC tournament winner Rankings from AP poll

The 2023–24 Missouri Tigers men's basketball team represented the University of Missouri in the 2023–24 NCAA Division I men's basketball season and was led by second year head coach Dennis Gates. The team played its home games at Mizzou Arena in Columbia, Missouri as a twelfth-year member of the Southeastern Conference.

The Tigers finished their regular season without a win (0–18) in SEC play, the first time the team had not won a conference game since their 1907–08 season. The team lost their opening round game in the 2024 SEC men's basketball tournament, bringing their final loss total to 0–19 in conference play.

== Previous season ==
The Tigers finished the season 25–10, 11–7 in SEC play to finish tied for fourth place. They started the season on a hot streak winning their first nine games of the season before losing to old Big 12 rival Kansas. Missouri won their next three, including a win against ranked rival Illinois and an win against ranked Kentucky. After being ranked for the first time under new head coach Dennis Gates, they would lose four of their next six games. The Tigers would finish the regular season winning four straight games heading into the SEC Tournament. They secured a four seed in the conference tournament, gaining a double-bye. Mizzou would play Tennessee and beat them 79–71. Missouri then would play the number one seed Alabama in the semifinals, but ultimately came up short 61–72.

The Tigers would achieve an at-large bid to the 2023 NCAA Tournament. The Tigers were placed in the South region of the bracket as a seven seed and would play the 10-seed Utah State in the first round. The Tigers won over the Aggies 76–65. In the second round, they would face the 15-seeded Princeton, but Missouri would bow out of the tournament with a 63–78 loss.

== Offseason ==
=== Departures ===
Name	Number	Pos.	Height	Weight	Year	Hometown	Reason for departure
D'Moi Hodge	5	G	6'4"	188	Senior	Tortola, British Virgin Islands	Undrafted, signed Two-Way contract with Los Angeles Lakers
Mohamed Diarra	0	F	6'10"	215	Junior	Paris, France	Transferred to NC State
Ronnie DeGray III	13	F	6'6"	225	Junior	Parker, CO	Transferred to Wichita State
Tre Gomillion	2	G	6'4"	215	Senior	Augusta, GA	Graduated
DeAndre Gholston	4	G	6'5"	215	RS-Senior	Gary, IN	Graduated
Ben Sternberg	31	G	6'0"	165	Graduate Student	Cleveland, OH	Graduated
Isiaih Mosley	11	G	6'5"	205	Graduate Student	Macon, MO	Graduated
Kobe Brown	24	G/F	6'8"	250	Graduate Student	Huntsville, AL	Drafted by the Los Angeles Clippers in the 2023 NBA Draft

=== Incoming transfers ===
Name	Number	Pos.	Height	Weight	Year	Hometown	Previous school
Curt Lewis	4	G	6'5"	220	Junior	Louisville, KY	Transfer from John A. Logan College
Caleb Grill	31	F	6'3"	196	Senior	Maize, KS	Transfer from Iowa State
John Tonje	5	F	6'5"	210	Senior	Omaha, NE	Transfer from Colorado State
Tamar Bates	2	G	6'5"	198	Junior	Kansas City, KS	Transfer from Indiana
Jesús Carralero Martín	13	F	6'8"	220	Senior	Málaga, Spain	Transfer from Campbell
Connor Vanover	75	C	7'5"	227	Senior	Little Rock, AR	Transfer from Oral Roberts

==== 2023 recruiting class ====
College recruiting information
Name	Hometown	School	Height	Weight	Commit date
Anthony Robinson; G	Tallahassee, FL	Florida State University School	6 ft 3 in (1.91 m)	155 lb (70 kg)	Jun 30, 2022
Anthony Robinson; G	Recruit ratings: Rivals: 247Sports: ESPN: (81)				
Trent Pierce; F	Tulsa, OK	Union High School	6 ft 8 in (2.03 m)	185 lb (84 kg)	Jul 12, 2022
Trent Pierce; F	Recruit ratings: Rivals: 247Sports: ESPN: (84)				
Jordan Butler; C	Mauldin, SC	Christ Church Episcopal School	6 ft 11 in (2.11 m)	215 lb (98 kg)	Oct 5, 2022
Jordan Butler; C	Recruit ratings: Rivals: 247Sports: ESPN: (82)				
Danny Stephens; F, (walk-on)	Augusta, IL	Southeastern High School	6 ft 6 in (1.98 m)	190 lb (86 kg)	Nov 17, 2022
Danny Stephens; F, (walk-on)	Recruit ratings: No ratings found				
JV Brown; G, (walk-on)	San Pedro, CA	Rolling Hills Prep	6 ft 4 in (1.93 m)	N/A	Mar 1, 2023
JV Brown; G, (walk-on)	Recruit ratings: No ratings found				
Overall recruit ranking: Scout: 26 Rivals: 32
Note: In many cases, Scout, Rivals, 247Sports, On3, and ESPN may conflict in their listings of height and weight.; In these cases, the average was taken. ESPN grades are on a 100-point scale.; Sources:

==== 2024 recruiting class ====
College recruiting information (2024)
Name	Hometown	School	Height	Weight	Commit date
T.O. Barrett; G	Edmond, OK	Link Academy	6 ft 4 in (1.93 m)	180 lb (82 kg)	Jun 29, 2023
T.O. Barrett; G	Recruit ratings: Rivals: 247Sports: ESPN: (79)				
Peyton Marshall; C	Marietta, GA	Carlton J. Kell High School	7 ft 0 in (2.13 m)	310 lb (140 kg)	Aug 11, 2023
Peyton Marshall; C	Recruit ratings: Rivals: 247Sports: ESPN: (81)				
Marcus Allen; F	Miami, FL	Miami Norland Senior High School	6 ft 6 in (1.98 m)	190 lb (86 kg)	Aug 7, 2023
Marcus Allen; F	Recruit ratings: Rivals: 247Sports: ESPN: (85)				
Overall recruit ranking: Scout: 3 Rivals: 6
Note: In many cases, Scout, Rivals, 247Sports, On3, and ESPN may conflict in their listings of height and weight.; In these cases, the average was taken. ESPN grades are on a 100-point scale.; Sources:

== Roster ==
2023–24 Missouri Tigers men's basketball team
Players
Coaches

Pos.	#	Name	Height	Weight	Year	Previous school	Hometown
C	0	Jordan Butler	6 ft 11 in (2.11 m)	215 lb (98 kg)	Fr	Christ Church Episcopal School	Greenville, SC
G	1	Kaleb Brown	6 ft 7 in (2.01 m)	250 lb (113 kg)	Jr	Lee High School	Huntsville, AL
G	2	Tamar Bates	6 ft 5 in (1.96 m)	195 lb (88 kg)	Jr	IMG Academy; Indiana	Kansas City, KS
G	4	Curt Lewis	6 ft 5 in (1.96 m)	220 lb (100 kg)	Jr	John A. Logan College	Louisville, KY
F	5	John Tonje	6 ft 5 in (1.96 m)	210 lb (95 kg)	Sr	Omaha Central High School; Colorado State	Omaha, NE
G	10	Nick Honor	5 ft 10 in (1.78 m)	200 lb (91 kg)	GS	Lake Highland Preparatory School; Clemson	Orlando, FL
F	11	Trent Pierce	6 ft 8 in (2.03 m)	180 lb (82 kg)	Fr	Compass Prep	Tulsa, OK
G	12	Jackson Francois (W)	6 ft 4 in (1.93 m)	155 lb (70 kg)	So	Bishop Gorman High School	Las Vegas, NV
F	13	Jesús Carralero	6 ft 8 in (2.03 m)	220 lb (100 kg)	Sr	Campbell	Málaga, Spain
G	14	Anthony Robinson	6 ft 3 in (1.91 m)	155 lb (70 kg)	Fr	Florida State University School	Tallahassee, FL
F	15	Danny Stephens (W)	6 ft 6 in (1.98 m)	190 lb (86 kg)	Fr	Southeastern High School	Augusta, IL
F	23	Aidan Shaw	6 ft 8 in (2.03 m)	195 lb (88 kg)	So	Blue Valley High School	Stillwell, KS
G	31	Caleb Grill	6 ft 3 in (1.91 m)	196 lb (89 kg)	Sr	Maize High School; Iowa State	Maize, KS
G	33	JV Brown (W)	6 ft 4 in (1.93 m)	—	Fr	Rolling Hills Prep	San Pedro, CA
F	35	Noah Carter	6 ft 6 in (1.98 m)	235 lb (107 kg)	Sr	Dubuque Senior High School; Northern Iowa	Dubuque, IA
C	45	Mabor Majak (W)	7 ft 2 in (2.18 m)	245 lb (111 kg)	Sr	Hamilton Southeastern High School; Cleveland State	Biemnon, South Sudan
G	55	Sean East II	6 ft 3 in (1.91 m)	180 lb (82 kg)	Sr	New Albany High School; John A. Logan College	Louisville, KY
C	75	Connor Vanover	7 ft 5 in (2.26 m)	227 lb (103 kg)	Sr	Findlay Prep; California; Arkansas; Oral Roberts	Little Rock, AR

Head coach

- Dennis Gates (California)

Assistant coach(es)

- Charlton Young (Georgia Southern)
- Dickey Nutt (Oklahoma State)
- Kyle Smithpeters (Southern Illinois)

Legend

- (C) Team captain
- (S) Suspended
- (I) Ineligible
- (W) Walk-on
- Injured
- Current redshirt

Roster

== Schedule and results ==
Date time, TV	Rank^{#}	Opponent^{#}	Result	Record	High points	High rebounds	High assists	Site (attendance) city, state
Non-conference regular season
November 6, 2023*; 7:00 p.m., SECN+/ESPN+		Arkansas–Pine Bluff	W 101–79	1–0	21 – East II	9 – Shaw	4 – Tied	Mizzou Arena (11,486); Columbia, MO
November 10, 2023*; 8:00 p.m., SECN		Memphis	L 55–70	1–1	14 – East II	10 – Grill	2 – Tied	Mizzou Arena (15,061); Columbia, MO
November 13, 2023*; 7:00 p.m., SECN+/ESPN+		SIU Edwardsville	W 68–50	2–1	20 – East II	10 – Carter	5 – Robinson	Mizzou Arena (9,656); Columbia, MO
November 16, 2023*; 8:00 p.m., BTN		at Minnesota	W 70–68	3–1	16 – Honor	6 – Carter	4 – Grill	Williams Arena (7,975); Minneapolis, MN
November 19, 2023*; 5:00 p.m., SECN+/ESPN+		Jackson State; Missouri/Tulsa Multi-Team Event	L 72–73	3–2	17 – Honor	7 – Tied	6 – Carralero Martin	Mizzou Arena (9,690); Columbia, MO
November 22, 2023*; 6:00 p.m., SECN+/ESPN+		South Carolina State; Missouri/Tulsa Multi-Team Event	W 82–59	4–2	21 – East II	7 – Shaw	4 – East II	Mizzou Arena (9,745); Columbia, MO
November 25, 2023*; 11:00 a.m., SECN+/ESPN+		Loyola (MD)	W 78–70	5–2	18 – Carter	6 – Carter	4 – East II	Mizzou Arena (9,762); Columbia, MO
November 28, 2023*; 6:00 p.m., ESPNU		at Pittsburgh; ACC–SEC Challenge	W 71–64	6–2	21 – East II	8 – Carter	4 – Tied	Petersen Events Center (7,390); Pittsburgh, PA
December 3, 2023*; 2:00 p.m., ESPN2		Wichita State	W 82–72	7–2	22 – East II	10 – Grill	9 – East II	Mizzou Arena (10,885); Columbia, MO
December 9, 2023*; 4:15 p.m., ESPN		at No. 2 Kansas; Border War	L 64–73	7–3	21 – East II	8 – Carter	6 – East II	Allen Fieldhouse (16,300); Lawrence, KS
December 17, 2023; 4:00 p.m., ESPN		vs. Seton Hall	L 87–93	7–4	22 – Bates	9 – Carter	6 – East II	T-Mobile Center (7,062); Kansas City, MO
December 22, 2023*; 8:00 p.m., FS1		vs. No. 13 Illinois; Braggin' Rights	L 73–97	7–5	18 – East II	6 – Robinson	2 – East II	Enterprise Center (18,485); St. Louis, MO
December 30, 2023*; 2:00 p.m., SECN		Central Arkansas	W 92–59	8–5	25 – Bates	8 – Carter	5 – Honor	Mizzou Arena (10,623); Columbia, MO
SEC regular season
January 6, 2024; 12:00 p.m., SECN		Georgia	L 68–75	8–6 (0–1)	18 – East II	6 – East II	8 – East II	Mizzou Arena (12,407); Columbia, MO
January 9, 2024; 6:00 p.m., ESPN		at No. 6 Kentucky	L 77–90	8–7 (0–2)	20 – Carter	4 – Tied	4 – Carralero Martin	Rupp Arena (20,086); Lexington, KY
January 13, 2024; 2:30 p.m., SECN		South Carolina	L 69–71 ^{OT}	8–8 (0–3)	23 – Carter	8 – East II	4 – Carralero Martin	Mizzou Arena (11,135); Columbia, MO
January 16, 2024; 6:00 p.m., SECN		at Alabama	L 75–93	8–9 (0–4)	19 – Bates	4 – East II	4 – East II	Coleman Coliseum (11,569); Tuscaloosa, AL
January 20, 2024; 7:00 p.m., ESPNU		Florida	L 67–79	8–10 (0–5)	36 – Bates	4 – East II	3 – East II	Mizzou Arena (11,489); Columbia, MO
January 23, 2024; 8:00 p.m., SECN		at Texas A&M	L 57–63	8–11 (0–6)	17 – East II	6 – Carter	5 – East II	Reed Arena (9,623); College Station, TX
January 27, 2024; 12:00 p.m., SECN		at South Carolina	L 64–72	8–12 (0–7)	21 – East II	7 – Bates	7 – East II	Colonial Life Arena (13,553); Columbia, SC
January 31, 2024; 7:30 p.m., SECN		Arkansas	L 84–91	8–13 (0–8)	29 – Bates	6 – East II	7 – East II	Mizzou Arena (11,020); Columbia, MO
February 3, 2024; 2:30 p.m., SECN		at Vanderbilt	L 61–68	8–14 (0–9)	20 – Carter	6 – Carter	4 – East II	Memorial Gymnasium (6,905); Nashville, TN
February 7, 2024; 8:00 p.m., ESPN2		Texas A&M	L 60–79	8–15 (0–10)	20 – Bates	7 – Shaw	3 – Bates	Mizzou Arena (9,814); Columbia, MO
February 10, 2024; 7:30 p.m., SECN		Mississippi State	L 51–75	8–16 (0–11)	15 – Honor	7 – Carter	4 – Carter	Mizzou Arena (10,620); Columbia, MO
February 17, 2024; 7:30 p.m., SECN		at Ole Miss	L 76–79	8–17 (0–12)	25 – East II	5 – Shaw	6 – East II	SJB Pavilion (8,598); Oxford, MS
February 20, 2024; 6:00 p.m., SECN		No. 5 Tennessee	L 67–72	8–18 (0–13)	24 – East II	7 – Carter	6 – East II	Mizzou Arena (10,089); Columbia, MO
February 24, 2024; 11:00 a.m., ESPN2		at Arkansas	L 73–88	8–19 (0–14)	33 – East II	7 – Carter	2 – Tied	Bud Walton Arena (19,200); Fayetteville, AR
February 28, 2024; 5:30 p.m., SECN		at No. 24 Florida	L 74–83	8–20 (0–15)	20 – East II	6 – Vanover	4 – East II	O'Connell Center (9,072); Gainesville, FL
March 2, 2024; 7:30 p.m., SECN		Ole Miss	L 78–84	8–21 (0–16)	27 – East II	9 – Shaw	4 – Carralero	Mizzou Arena (11,021); Columbia, MO
March 5, 2024; 8:00 p.m., SECN		No. 13 Auburn	L 74–101	8–22 (0–17)	21 – East II	9 – Shaw	3 – East II	Mizzou Arena (10,041); Columbia, MO
March 9, 2024; 7:30 p.m., SECN		at LSU	L 80–84	8–23 (0–18)	26 – East II	5 – East II	3 – Robinson II	Pete Maravich Assembly Center; Baton Rouge, LA
SEC Tournament
March 13, 2024; 8:30 p.m., SECN	(14)	vs. (11) Georgia; First round	L 59–64	8–24	14 – Honor	10 – Vanover	5 – East II	Bridgestone Arena (16539); Nashville, TN
*Non-conference game. ^{#}Rankings from AP Poll. (#) Tournament seedings in parentheses. All times are in Central Time.

== Rankings ==
Ranking movements Legend: ██ Increase in ranking ██ Decrease in ranking — = Not ranked RV = Received votes
	Week																			
Poll	Pre	1	2	3	4	5	6	7	8	9	10	11	12	13	14	15	16	17	18	Final
AP	RV	—	—	—	—	—	—	—	—	—	—	—	—	—	—	—	—	—	—	—
Coaches	RV	—	—	—	—	—	—	—	—	—	—	—	—	—	—	—	—	—	—	—
