= Illinois Route 101 =

East-west state highway in Illinois, US

Illinois Route 101
- IL 101 highlighted in red

Route information
- Maintained by IDOT
- Length: 19.43 mi (31.27 km)
- Existed: 1924–present

Major junctions
- West end: IL 61 in Augusta
- East end: US 67 in Littleton

Location
- Country: United States
- State: Illinois
- Counties: Schuyler, Hancock

Highway system
- Illinois State Highway System; Interstate; US; State; Tollways; Scenic
← IL 100	→ IL 102

Illinois Route 101 (IL 101) is a 19.43-mile-long (31.27 km) east–west state road that runs from to the intersection of Illinois Route 61 in Augusta east to U.S. Highway 67 one mile (1.6 km) east of Littleton. The highway was officially established in 1924 along its current alignment. Route 101 is maintained by the Illinois Department of Transportation.

== Route description ==
Route 101 begins at a junction with Route 61 in Augusta, in Hancock County. The route leaves Augusta to the east and crosses into Schuyler County, entering Weinberg-King State Park across the county line. The highway continues east past the park until the community of Brooklyn, where it meets Route 99. After passing through Brooklyn, Route 101 heads eastward through Littleton before terminating at a junction with U.S. Route 67.

== History ==
A road between Augusta and Littleton was marked as early as the 1917 Illinois highway map; this road followed the route of Route 101 between Littleton and Brooklyn, but took a more southerly route through Huntsville between Brooklyn and Augusta. Route 101 was designated along its current route under the 1924 State Bond Issue bill, which provided funds for the construction of Illinois Routes 47 to 185. By 1924, the road between Augusta and Littleton was aligned onto the current route of Route 101. Route 101 was first numbered on the 1929 highway map.

== Major intersections ==
County	Location	mi	km	Destinations	Notes
Hancock	Augusta	0.0	0.0	IL 61	Western terminus
Schuyler	Brooklyn	9.4	15.1	IL 99 south	Northern terminus of IL 99
Schuyler	Littleton	19.4	31.2	US 67	Eastern terminus
1.000 mi = 1.609 km; 1.000 km = 0.621 mi

== See also ==
- Illinois Route 336
