= Mahmoud Abdelfattah =

Palestinian basketball coach

Iowa Wolves
- Title: Head coach
- League: NBA G League

Personal information
- Born: September 24, 1988 (age 38) Chicago, Illinois, U.S.
- Listed height: 6 ft 3 in (1.91 m)
- Listed weight: 175 lb (79 kg)

Career information
- High school: Taft (Chicago, Illinois)
- College: Wilbur Wright (2006–2008); St. Cloud (2009–2010)
- NBA draft: 2010: undrafted
- Position: Guard
- Coaching career: 2011–present

Career history

Coaching
- 2011–2013: Perspectives Charter Schools (assistant)
- 2013–2017: St. Cloud (assistant)
- 2018–2019: Rio Grande Valley Vipers (assistant)
- 2019–2022: Rio Grande Valley Vipers
- 2022–2023: Houston Rockets (assistant)
- 2023–2024: Sydney Kings
- 2025–present: Iowa Wolves
- 2026: NBA G League United

Career highlights
- As head coach: FIBA Intercontinental Cup champion (2026); NBA G League champion (2022); NBA G League Coach of the Year (2022); As assistant coach: NBA G League champion (2019)

Mahmoud Abdelfattah (born September 24, 1988) is a Palestinian-American professional basketball coach who is the head coach for the Iowa Wolves of the NBA G-League. He became the first ever Palestinian or Muslim head coach of a National Basketball Association (NBA) or NBA G League franchise when he served as head coach of the Rio Grande Valley Vipers from 2019 to 2022.

== Early life ==
Abdelfattah was born and raised in Chicago, Illinois, to parents who had immigrated from Palestine as part of the 1967 Palestinian exodus. He identifies as Palestinian and visited the territory as a child. Abdelfattah attended a private Muslim school until the eighth grade and then moved to the public system.

Abdelfattah played basketball at Wilbur Wright College and was recruited to play at St. Cloud State University. He found his desire for coaching while at St. Cloud State when he realised that he would not be able to play in the National Basketball Association (NBA). He served as a student-assistant on the basketball team at the age of 21 and had his student debt covered by the school.

== Coaching career ==
Abdelfattah began his coaching stint with Perspectives Charter Schools in 2011, serving as the assistant head coach for the team.

In 2019, after spending his first season as assistant coach for the Rio Grande Valley Vipers and winning his first championship with the franchise, Abdelfattah was promoted to be the head coach of the team.

Abdelfattah was named the NBA G League Coach of the Year for the 2021–22 season after leading the Vipers to a 24–10 record. The Vipers eventually would win another title.

On July 3, 2022, the Houston Rockets hired Abdelfattah as an assistant coach.

On June 21, 2023, Abdelfattah was hired as head coach of the Sydney Kings of the Australian National Basketball League (NBL) for the 2023–24 season. After winning seven of his first 10 games in charge, the Kings lost 13 of their remaining 19 matches, including the play-in qualifier defeat to the New Zealand Breakers, thus winning 10 of 29 games. The Kings subsequently parted ways with Abdelfattah on March 1, 2024.

On September 13, 2025, Abdelfattah was hired as the head coach of the Iowa Wolves of the NBA G-League.

== Head coaching record ==
As of April 19, 2022

Team	Year	G	W	L	W–L%	Result
Rio Grande Valley Vipers	2019–20	42	15	27	.357	Season canceled
Rio Grande Valley Vipers	2020–21	15	9	6	.600	Lost in Quarterfinals
Rio Grande Valley Vipers	2021–22	35	25	10	.714	Champions
Career		92	49	43	.533	

== Personal life ==
Abdelfattah is Muslim. He was only lightly religious during his early years but adjusted his attitude after the death of his mother from a heart attack when he was aged 19. Abdelfattah completed Hajj in 2019.
