= 2023–24 Alabama Crimson Tide men's basketball team =

American college basketball season

2023–24 Alabama Crimson Tide men's basketball

NCAA tournament, Final Four
- Conference: Southeastern Conference

Ranking
- Coaches: No. 4
- AP: No. 3
- Record: 25–12 (13–5 SEC)
- Head coach: Nate Oats (5th season)
- Assistant coaches: Austin Claunch (1st season); Ryan Pannone (1st season); Preston Murphy (1st season)
- Home arena: Coleman Coliseum

2023–24 Southeastern Conference men's basketball standings
	Conf.				Overall
Team	W		L	PCT	W		L	PCT
No. 5 Tennessee	14	–	4	.778	27	–	9	.750
No. 20 Kentucky	13	–	5	.722	23	–	10	.697
No. 3т Alabama	13	–	5	.722	25	–	12	.676
No. 18 Auburn †	13	–	5	.722	27	–	8	.771
No. 25 South Carolina	13	–	5	.722	26	–	8	.765
Florida	11	–	7	.611	24	–	12	.667
Texas A&M	9	–	9	.500	21	–	15	.583
LSU	9	–	9	.500	17	–	16	.515
Mississippi State	8	–	10	.444	21	–	14	.600
Ole Miss	7	–	11	.389	20	–	12	.625
Georgia	6	–	12	.333	20	–	17	.541
Arkansas	6	–	12	.333	16	–	17	.485
Vanderbilt	4	–	14	.222	9	–	23	.281
Missouri	0	–	18	.000	8	–	24	.250
† 2024 SEC tournament winner Rankings from AP poll

The 2023–24 Alabama Crimson Tide men's basketball team represented the University of Alabama during the 2023–24 NCAA Division I men's basketball season. The Crimson Tide was led by fifth-year head coach Nate Oats. They played their home games at Coleman Coliseum located in Tuscaloosa, Alabama as a member of the SEC. After a successful regular season, finishing ranked No. 19, they qualified for the March Madness tournament and advanced to the Final Four for the first time in school history, but were defeated 86–72 by the eventual national champions, the UConn Huskies.

The Alabama Crimson Tide men's basketball team drew an average home attendance of 11,359 in 15 games in 2023–24.

== Previous season ==
The Crimson Tide finished the 2022–23 season with a record of 31–6, 16–2 in SEC play to win the regular season championship. They defeated Mississippi State, Missouri, and Texas A&M to win the SEC tournament championship. As a result, they secured the conference's automatic bid to the NCAA tournament as the number one seed in the South region. As the number one overall seed in the tournament, they beat Texas A&M–Corpus Christi and Maryland to advance to the Sweet Sixteen, until they were upset by San Diego State.

== Offseason ==
=== Departures ===
Name	Number	Pos.	Height	Weight	Year	Hometown	Reason for departure
Jaden Bradley	0	G	6'3"	185	Freshman	Rochester, NY	Transferred to Arizona
Noah Gurley	4	F	6'8"	215	Graduate Student	Fayetteville, GA	Graduated
Jahvon Quinerly	5	G	6'1"	175	Senior	Hackensack, NJ	Transferred to Memphis
Dom Welch	10	G	6'5"	205	Graduate Student	Buffalo, NY	Graduated
Delaney Heard	12	G	6'3"	198	Junior	Canton, GA	Transferred to Kennesaw State
Charles Bediako	14	C	7'0"	225	Sophomore	Brampton, Ontario	Declared for 2023 NBA draft
Noah Clowney	15	F	6'10"	210	Freshman	Spartanburg, SC	Declared for 2023 NBA draft
Brandon Miller	24	F	6'9"	200	Freshman	Antioch, TN	Declared for 2023 NBA draft
Nimari Burnett	25	G	6'4"	190	RS Sophomore	Chicago, IL	Transferred to Michigan
Adam Cottrell	30	G	6'3"	200	Senior	Flowery Branch, GA	Graduated
Jaden Quinerly	34	G	6'0"	155	Junior	Hackensack, NJ	Left the program

=== Incoming transfers ===
Name	Number	Pos.	Height	Weight	Year	Hometown	Previous School
Grant Nelson	2	F	6'11"	230	Senior	Devils Lake, ND	North Dakota State
Mohamed Wague	11	F	6'10"	225	Junior	Bronx, NY	West Virginia
Latrell Wrightsell Jr.	12	G	6'3"	190	Senior	Omaha, NE	Cal State Fullerton
Aaron Estrada	55	G	6'3"	190	Graduate Student	Woodbury, NJ	Hofstra

=== 2023 Recruiting class ===
College recruiting information
Name	Hometown	School	Height	Weight	Commit date
Jarin Stevenson; PF	Chapel Hill, NC	Seaforth High School	6 ft 8 in (2.03 m)	195 lb (88 kg)	Jun 21, 2023
Jarin Stevenson; PF	Recruit ratings: Rivals: 247Sports: ESPN: (87)				
Sam Walters; PF	The Villages, FL	The Villages Charter High School	6 ft 8 in (2.03 m)	210 lb (95 kg)	Jun 3, 2022
Sam Walters; PF	Recruit ratings: Rivals: 247Sports: ESPN: (85)				
Kris Parker; SF	Tallahassee, FL	Crossroad Academy	6 ft 6 in (1.98 m)	185 lb (84 kg)	Mar 3, 2023
Kris Parker; SF	Recruit ratings: Rivals: 247Sports: ESPN: (84)				
Mouhamed Dioubate; PF	Queens, NY	Putnam Science Academy	6 ft 7 in (2.01 m)	210 lb (95 kg)	Oct 16, 2022
Mouhamed Dioubate; PF	Recruit ratings: Rivals: 247Sports: ESPN: (82)				
Overall recruit ranking:
Note: In many cases, Scout, Rivals, 247Sports, On3, and ESPN may conflict in their listings of height and weight.; In these cases, the average was taken. ESPN grades are on a 100-point scale.; Sources: "2023 Alabama Commits". Rivals.; "2023 Team Ranking". Rivals.

== Roster ==
2023–24 Alabama Crimson Tide men's basketball team
Players
Coaches

Pos.	#	Name	Height	Weight	Year	Previous school	Hometown
G	0	Kris Parker	6 ft 9 in (2.06 m)	195 lb (88 kg)	Fr	Crossroad Academy	Tallahassee, FL
G	1	Mark Sears	6 ft 1 in (1.85 m)	185 lb (84 kg)	Sr	Ohio	Muscle Shoals, AL
F	2	Grant Nelson	6 ft 11 in (2.11 m)	230 lb (104 kg)	Sr	North Dakota State	Devils Lake, ND
G	3	Rylan Griffen	6 ft 6 in (1.98 m)	190 lb (86 kg)	So	Richardson HS	Dallas, TX
G	4	Davin Cosby Jr.	6 ft 5 in (1.96 m)	205 lb (93 kg)	RS Fr	Word of God Christian Academy	Richmond, VA
F	10	Mouhamed Dioubate	6 ft 7 in (2.01 m)	215 lb (98 kg)	Fr	Putnam Science Academy	Queens, NY
F	11	Mohamed Wague	6 ft 10 in (2.08 m)	225 lb (102 kg)	Jr	Harcum College; West Virginia	Bronx, NY
G	12	Latrell Wrightsell Jr.	6 ft 3 in (1.91 m)	190 lb (86 kg)	Sr	Cal State Fullerton	Omaha, NE
F	15	Jarin Stevenson	6 ft 11 in (2.11 m)	210 lb (95 kg)	Fr	Seaforth HS	Chapel Hill, NC
F	23	Nick Pringle	6 ft 10 in (2.08 m)	230 lb (104 kg)	Sr	Dodge City CC; Wofford	Seabrook, SC
F	24	Sam Walters	6 ft 10 in (2.08 m)	198 lb (90 kg)	Fr	The Villages Charter HS	The Villages, FL
F	31	Max Scharnowski (W)	6 ft 6 in (1.98 m)	205 lb (93 kg)	Sr	Wheaton Academy	Elgin, IL
G	32	Kai Spears (W)	6 ft 2 in (1.88 m)	160 lb (73 kg)	So	Bishop Canevin HS	Pittsburgh, PA
F	33	Ward Harrell (W)	6 ft 7 in (2.01 m)	220 lb (100 kg)	Fr	New Braunfels HS	New Braunfels, TX
G	55	Aaron Estrada	6 ft 3 in (1.91 m)	190 lb (86 kg)	GS	Saint Peter's; Oregon; Hofstra	Woodbury, NJ

Head coach

- Nate Oats (Maranatha Baptist)

Assistant coach(es)

- Austin Claunch (Emory)
- Ryan Pannone (South Florida)
- Preston Murphy (Rhode Island)

Legend

- (C) Team captain
- (S) Suspended
- (I) Ineligible
- (W) Walk-on
- Injured
- Current redshirt

Roster

== Schedule and results ==
Date time, TV	Rank^{#}	Opponent^{#}	Result	Record	High points	High rebounds	High assists	Site (attendance) city, state
Exhibition
October 29, 2023*; 12:00 p.m., –	No. 24	at Wake Forest	L 80–88	–	24 – Estrada	9 – Pringle	4 – Wrightshell Jr.	LJVM Coliseum (2,679); Winston-Salem, NC
Non-conference regular season
November 6, 2023*; 7:00 p.m., SECN+/ESPN+	No. 24	Morehead State	W 105–73	1–0	24 – Nelson	7 – Nelson	5 – Sears	Coleman Coliseum (9,078); Tuscaloosa, AL
November 10, 2023*; 7:00 p.m., SECN+/ESPN+	No. 24	Indiana State	W 102–80	2–0	27 – Estrada	8 – Nelson	5 – Estrada	Coleman Coliseum (10,900); Tuscaloosa, AL
November 14, 2023*; 7:00 p.m., SECN+/ESPN+	No. 22	South Alabama	W 102–46	3–0	17 – Sears	7 – Tied	6 – Nelson	Coleman Coliseum (9,828); Tuscaloosa, AL
November 17, 2023*; 7:00 p.m., SECN+/ESPN+	No. 22	Mercer; Emerald Coast Classic campus site game	W 98–67	4–0	24 – Sears	7 – Nelson	6 – Sears	Coleman Coliseum (10,300); Tuscaloosa, AL
November 24, 2023*; 6:00 p.m., CBSSN	No. 17	vs. Ohio State; Emerald Coast Classic semifinals	L 81–92	4–1	20 – Nelson	6 – Nelson	4 – Tied	The Arena at NFSC (2,196); Niceville, FL
November 25, 2023*; 3:00 p.m., FloHoops	No. 17	vs. Oregon; Emerald Coast Classic third place game	W 99–91	5–1	27 – Sears	8 – Nelson	4 – Estrada	The Arena at NFSC (2,196); Niceville, FL
November 28, 2023*; 8:30 p.m., ESPN	No. 23	Clemson; ACC–SEC Challenge	L 77–85	5–2	23 – Sears	8 – Nelson	3 – Sears	Coleman Coliseum (10,725); Tuscaloosa, AL
December 4, 2023*; 7:00 p.m., SECN		Arkansas State	W 89–65	6–2	13 – Tied	7 – Wague	6 – Sears	Coleman Coliseum (9,703); Tuscaloosa, AL
December 9, 2023*; 12:30 p.m., FOX		vs. No. 4 Purdue; Basketball Hall of Fame Series Toronto	L 86–92	6–3	35 – Sears	7 – Tied	5 – Tied	Coca-Cola Coliseum (3,828); Toronto, ON
December 16, 2023*; 7:00 p.m., FOX		at No. 8 Creighton	L 82–85	6–4	19 – Sears	7 – Pringle	4 – Estrada	CHI Health Center Omaha (17,401); Omaha, NE
December 20, 2023*; 10:00 p.m., ESPN		vs. No. 4 Arizona; Jerry Colangelo Hall of Fame Series	L 74–87	6–5	17 – Nelson	7 – Wague	6 – Estrada	Footprint Center (11,812); Phoenix, AZ
December 23, 2023*; 3:00 p.m., SECN		Eastern Kentucky	W 111–67	7–5	19 – Tied	10 – Pringle	7 – Estrada	Coleman Coliseum (9,950); Tuscaloosa, AL
December 30, 2023*; 1:00 p.m., SECN+/ESPN+		vs. Liberty; C.M. Newton Classic	W 101–56	8–5	19 – Wrightsell Jr	10 – Estrada	8 – Estrada	Legacy Arena (6,912); Birmingham, AL
SEC regular season
January 6, 2024; 2:30 p.m., SECN		at Vanderbilt	W 78–75	9–5 (1–0)	21 – Sears	7 – Estrada	6 – Estrada	Memorial Gymnasium (8,703); Nashville, TN
January 9, 2024; 6:00 p.m., SECN		South Carolina	W 74–47	10–5 (2–0)	31 – Sears	7 – Estrada	3 – Sears	Coleman Coliseum (10,208); Tuscaloosa, AL
January 13, 2024; 7:30 p.m., SECN		at Mississippi State	W 82–74	11–5 (3–0)	22 – Sears	9 – Nelson	2 – Tied	Humphrey Coliseum (9,142); Starkville, MS
January 16, 2024; 6:00 p.m., SECN		Missouri	W 93–75	12–5 (4–0)	21 – Tied	8 – Nelson	6 – Sears	Coleman Coliseum (11,569); Tuscaloosa, AL
January 20, 2024; 1:00 p.m., ESPN2		at No. 6 Tennessee	L 71–91	12–6 (4–1)	22 – Sears	5 – Tied	5 – Estrada	Thompson–Boling Arena (21,678); Knoxville, TN
January 24, 2024; 6:30 p.m., ESPN		No. 8 Auburn; Rivalry	W 79–75	13–6 (5–1)	22 – Sears	11 – Nelson	8 – Sears	Coleman Coliseum (13,474); Tuscaloosa, AL
January 27, 2024; 7:00 p.m., ESPN		LSU	W 109–88	14–6 (6–1)	21 – Sears	6 – Estrada	7 – Estrada	Coleman Coliseum (13,474); Tuscaloosa, AL
January 31, 2024; 5:30 p.m., SECN	No. 24	at Georgia	W 85–76	15–6 (7–1)	23 – Sears	5 – Tied	5 – Tied	Stegeman Coliseum (10,523); Athens, GA
February 3, 2024; 7:30 p.m., SECN	No. 24	Mississippi State	W 99–67	16–6 (8–1)	21 – Sears	9 – Dioubate	5 – Wrightsell Jr.	Coleman Coliseum (13,474); Tuscaloosa, AL
February 7, 2024; 6:00 p.m., ESPN2	No. 16	at No. 12 Auburn; Rivalry	L 81–99	16–7 (8–2)	25 – Sears	9 – Sears	4 – Sears	Neville Arena (9,121); Auburn, AL
February 10, 2024; 11:00 a.m., ESPN	No. 16	at LSU	W 109–92	17–7 (9–2)	23 – Sears	10 – Wrightsell Jr.	7 – Estrada	Pete Maravich Assembly Center (7,755); Baton Rouge, LA
February 17, 2024; 11:00 a.m., ESPN	No. 15	Texas A&M	W 100–75	18–7 (10–2)	23 – Sears	8 – Walters	7 – Estrada	Coleman Coliseum (13,474); Tuscaloosa, AL
February 21, 2024; 6:00 p.m., ESPN2	No. 13	No. 24 Florida	W 98–93 ^{OT}	19–7 (11–2)	22 – Nelson	8 – Tied	8 – Tied	Coleman Coliseum (11,077); Tuscaloosa, AL
February 24, 2024; 3:00 p.m., CBS	No. 13	at No. 17 Kentucky	L 95–117	19–8 (11–3)	21 – Griffen	7 – Nelson	5 – Estrada	Rupp Arena (20,342); Lexington, KY
February 28, 2024; 8:00 p.m., ESPN2	No. 14	at Ole Miss	W 103–88	20–8 (12–3)	26 – Sears	10 – Estrada	10 – Estrada	SJB Pavilion (7,722); Oxford, MS
March 2, 2024; 7:00 p.m., ESPN	No. 14	No. 4 Tennessee; College GameDay	L 74–81	20–9 (12–4)	22 – Sears	9 – Pringle	6 – Sears	Coleman Coliseum (13,474); Tuscaloosa, AL
March 5, 2024; 6:00 p.m., ESPN	No. 16	at Florida	L 87–105	20–10 (12–5)	33 – Sears	6 – Tied	3 – Estrada	O'Connell Center (11,006); Gainesville, FL
March 9, 2024; 11:00 a.m., ESPN	No. 16	Arkansas	W 92–88 ^{OT}	21–10 (13–5)	22 – Sears	13 – Nelson	7 – Estrada	Coleman Coliseum (11,031); Tuscaloosa, AL
SEC Tournament
March 15, 2024; 8:30 p.m., SECN	(3) No. 19	vs. (6) Florida; Quarterfinals	L 88–102	21–11	22 – Sears	10 – Pringle	4 – Sears	Bridgestone Arena (18,244); Nashville, TN
NCAA tournament
March 22, 2024*; 6:35 p.m., truTV	(4 W) No. 19	vs. (13 W) Charleston; First Round	W 109–96	22–11	30 – Sears	7 – Estrada	8 – Estrada	Spokane Veterans Memorial Arena (11,616); Spokane, WA
March 24, 2024*; 6:10 p.m., TBS	(4 W) No. 19	vs. (12 W) Grand Canyon; Second Round	W 72–61	23–11	26 – Sears	12 – Sears	6 – Tied	Spokane Veterans Memorial Arena (11,514); Spokane, WA
March 28, 2024*; 8:54 p.m., CBS	(4 W) No. 19	vs. (1 W) No. 5 North Carolina; Sweet Sixteen	W 89–87	24–11	24 – Nelson	12 – Nelson	3 – Tied	Crypto.com Arena (19,625); Los Angeles, CA
March 30, 2024*; 7:49 p.m., TBS	(4 W) No. 19	vs. (6 W) Clemson; Elite Eight	W 89–82	25–11	23 – Sears	11 – Pringle	7 – Estrada	Crypto.com Arena (19,227); Los Angeles, CA
April 6, 2024; 7:49 p.m., TBS	(4 W) No. 19	vs. (1 E) No. 1 UConn; Final Four	L 72–86	25–12	24 – Sears	15 – Nelson	3 – Tied	State Farm Stadium (74,720); Glendale, AZ
*Non-conference game. ^{#}Rankings from AP Poll. (#) Tournament seedings in parentheses. W=West. E=East. All times are in Central Time.

== Rankings ==
Ranking movements Legend: ██ Increase in ranking ██ Decrease in ranking — = Not ranked RV = Received votes
	Week																				
Poll	Pre	1	2	3	4	5	6	7	8	9	10	11	12	13	14	15	16	17	18	19	Final
AP	24	22	17	23	RV	RV	RV	RV	RV	RV	RV	RV	24	16	15	13	14	16	19	19	3
Coaches	24	22	15	20	RV	RV	—	—	—	RV	RV	RV	22	16	15	13	13	17	19	18	4
