= Leo Lyons (basketball) =

American basketball player (born 1987)

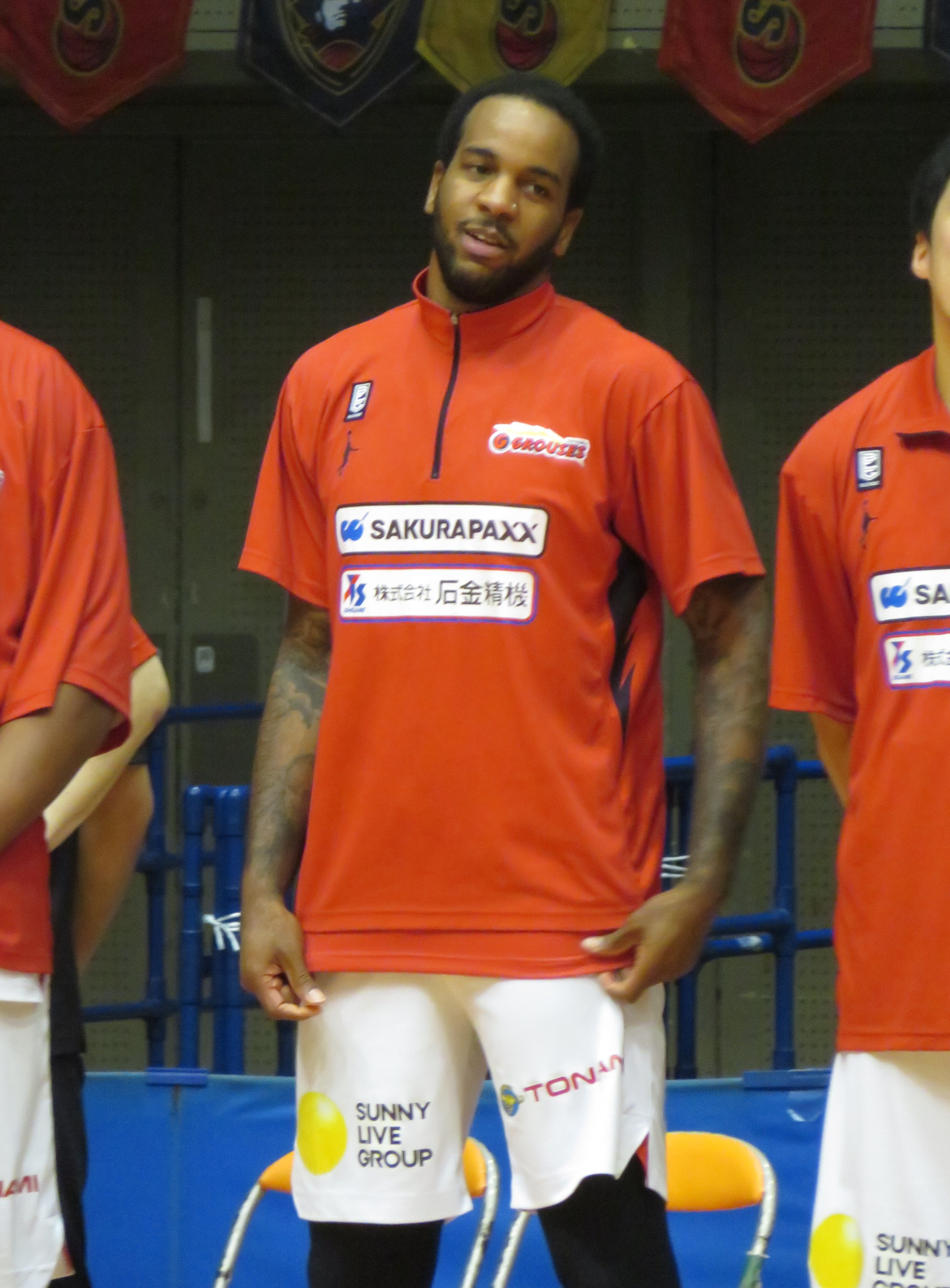
- Lyons with the Toyama Grouses in 2018

Personal information
- Born: May 6, 1987 (age 39) Topeka, Kansas, U.S.
- Listed height: 6 ft 9 in (2.06 m)
- Listed weight: 240 lb (109 kg)

Career information
- High school: Piper (Kansas City, Kansas); Coastal Christian (Virginia Beach, Virginia)
- College: Missouri (2005–2009)
- NBA draft: 2009: undrafted
- Playing career: 2009–2023
- Position: Power forward

Career history
- 2009–2010: Hapoel Jerusalem
- 2010: Hapoel Gilboa Galil
- 2010–2012: Austin Toros
- 2012: Dakota Wizards
- 2012–2013: Budivelnyk Kyiv
- 2013–2014: Pınar Karşıyaka
- 2014: Nizhny Novgorod
- 2014–2015: Seoul Samsung Thunders
- 2015: Goyang Orions
- 2015–2016: Ulsan Mobis Phoebus
- 2016: Atléticos de San Germán
- 2016–2017: Jeonju KCC Egis
- 2017: Akita Northern Happinets
- 2017–2018: Chiba Jets Funabashi
- 2018–2020: Toyama Grouses
- 2020-2021: Nagoya Diamond Dolphins
- 2021-2023: Altiri Chiba

Career highlights
- Third-team All-Big 12 (2009)
Medals
Men's basketball
Representing United States
Pan American Games
| Bronze medal – third place | 2011 Guadalajara | National team |

Leo Lyons (born May 6, 1987) is an American professional basketball player for Altiri Chiba of the B3 League. Lyons was born in Topeka, Kansas, and went to high school at Coastal Christian Academy and Piper High School. At both of these high schools, he excelled on the basketball teams. He went to the University of Missouri for college and played four seasons of basketball before going undrafted in the 2010 NBA draft.

== High school career ==
As a junior at Piper High School in Kansas City, Kansas, Lyons averaged 18 points and 10 rebounds per game while earning second-team all-state honors. Lyons transferred to Coastal Christian Academy in Virginia Beach, Virginia, where he averaged 21 points and 8 rebounds per game.

== College recruitment ==
College recruiting
| Name | Hometown | School | Height | Weight | Commit date |
|---|---|---|---|---|---|
| Leo (Criswell) Lyons; PF | Topeka/Ks | Coastal Christian Academy | 6 ft 8 in (2.03 m) | 200 lb (91 kg) | Aug 20, 2007 |
| Leo (Criswell) Lyons; PF | Recruit ratings: Scout: Rivals: | | | | |

== College career ==
Lyons played four years for the University of Missouri. After his junior season, where he averaged 13.1 points and 5.7 rebounds per game, Lyons was named to the Big 12 All-Improved team. As a senior, Lyons earned third team All Big 12 honors, averaging 14.6 points and 6.1 rebounds per game.

== College statistics ==
| Year | Team | GP | GS | MPG | FG% | 3P% | FT% | RPG | APG | SPG | BPG | PPG |
|---|---|---|---|---|---|---|---|---|---|---|---|---|
| 2005–06 | Missouri | 25 | 0 | 9.5 | .448 | .125 | .361 | 3.08 | 0.20 | 0.20 | 0.32 | 2.64 |
| 2006–07 | Missouri | 30 | 7 | 17.9 | .550 | .190 | .646 | 4.30 | 1.07 | 1.10 | 0.73 | 7.37 |
| 2007–08 | Missouri | 31 | 22 | 22.1 | .583 | .077 | .635 | 5.68 | 1.65 | 0.71 | 0.68 | 13.06 |
| 2008–09 | Missouri | 37 | 34 | 23.3 | .493 | .385 | .743 | 6.08 | 1.97 | 1.03 | 0.70 | 14.57 |
| Career | | 123 | 63 | 18.8 | .530 | .200 | .671 | 4.93 | 1.31 | 0.80 | 0.63 | 10.01 |

=== NCAA Awards & Honors ===
- All-Big 12 Third Team - 2009
- Big 12 All-Improved Team (Media) - 2008

=== NCAA Special Events Stats ===
| Year | Team | GP | GS | MPG | FG% | 3P% | FT% | RPG | APG | SPG | BPG | PPG |
|---|---|---|---|---|---|---|---|---|---|---|---|---|
| 2009 | Portsmouth Invitational Tournament | 3 | | 31.0 | .441 | .167 | .667 | 7.7 | 2.0 | 0.3 | 1.0 | 13.7 |

== Professional career ==
Lyons played the 2009–2010 season with Israeli basketball team, Hapoel Migdal Jerusalem. He played thirty-seven games with Hapoel Migdal Jerusalem, averaging seven points and one assist in eighteen minutes per game. For the first half of the 2010–2011 season, he played for Altshuler Saham Galil Gilboa, another Israeli team. Through eleven games with Altshuler Saham Galil Gilboa, Lyons averaged five points in fifteen minutes. Lyons signed with the Austin Toros in early 2011.

During the 2010–2011 season, Lyons started 27 games for the Toros, averaging 14.9 points and 6 rebounds per game.

On October 20, 2011, Lyons was named to the Team USA roster for the 2011 Pan American Games.

Lyons appeared in 26 games with the Toros during the 2011–2012 season, averaging 16.2 points and 8.9 rebounds per game. On March 6, 2012, Lyons was traded to the Dakota Wizards.

In 2012–13 season, while playing with Budivelnyk Kyiv, he averaged 14.6 points and 7.3 rebounds over 16 games in the Eurocup.

In August 2013, he signed a contract with Pınar Karşıyaka of the Turkish Basketball League. He left them in January 2014, and signed with Nizhny Novgorod. He parted ways with Nizhny on May 6, 2014.

In February 2017 he signed with Akita Northern Happinets of the Japanese B.League. He re-signed with the Happinets on May 29. But he officially announced his retirement as a professional basketball player on July 31, 2017. Because there is no "retirement regulations" of the B.League, he came terms with the Chiba Jets Funabashi on November 29.

=== The Basketball Tournament (TBT) (2016–present) ===
In the summers of 2016 and 2017, Lyons played in The Basketball Tournament on ESPN for team A Few Good Men (Gonzaga Alumni). He competed for the $2 million prize in 2017, and for team A Few Good Men, he averaged 7.7 points per game along with 7.9 rebounds per game. Lyon helped take team A Few Good Men to the Super 16 round, where they then lost to Team Challenge ALS 77–60.

== Career statistics ==
Legend
| GP | Games played | GS | Games started | MPG | Minutes per game |
| FG% | Field goal percentage | 3P% | 3-point field goal percentage | FT% | Free throw percentage |
| RPG | Rebounds per game | APG | Assists per game | SPG | Steals per game |
| BPG | Blocks per game | PPG | Points per game | **Bold** | Career high |

=== NBA Summer League Stats ===
| Year | Team | GP | GS | MPG | FG% | 3P% | FT% | RPG | APG | SPG | BPG | PPG |
|---|---|---|---|---|---|---|---|---|---|---|---|---|
| 2009–10 | CLE/IND | 8 | 0 | 12.3 | .618 | .333 | .800 | 2.50 | 0.12 | 0.12 | 0.00 | 7.38 |
| 2010–11 | NYK | 4 | 0 | 15.6 | .560 | .333 | .812 | 3.25 | 0.50 | 0.50 | 0.00 | 10.50 |
| 2012–13 | Select | 5 | 2 | 22.8 | .488 | .417 | .867 | 4.40 | 1.00 | 0.00 | 0.20 | 11.60 |
| Career | | 17 | 2 | 16.2 | .550 | .389 | .824 | 3.24 | 0.47 | 0.18 | 0.06 | 9.35 |

=== Regular season ===
| Year | Team | GP | GS | MPG | FG% | 3P% | FT% | RPG | APG | SPG | BPG | PPG |
|---|---|---|---|---|---|---|---|---|---|---|---|---|
| 2009–10 | Jerusalem | 10 | 6 | 15.9 | .431 | .000 | .478 | 3.60 | 0.60 | 0.60 | 0.00 | 6.10 |
| 2010–11 | Gilboa | 4 | 1 | 14.0 | .429 | .333 | .500 | 3.50 | 1.25 | 0.25 | 0.25 | 3.50 |
| 2010–11 | AUS | 34 | 27 | 29.6 | .481 | .392 | .694 | 6.03 | 1.65 | 0.85 | 0.24 | 14.88 |
| 2011–12 | AUS/DAK | 40 | 16 | 26.4 | .511 | .323 | .783 | 7.72 | 1.38 | 0.78 | 0.45 | 13.90 |
| 2012–13 | Budivelnyk | 69 | 68 | 27.9 | .490 | .363 | .782 | 6.99 | 1.80 | 0.80 | 0.49 | 15.71 |
| 2013–14 | Karşıyaka/Nizhny | 30 | 23 | 23.2 | .465 | .343 | .754 | 5.07 | 1.10 | 0.80 | 0.27 | 11.33 |
| 2014–15 | Samsung/Goyang | 59 | 48 | 26.4 | .444 | .340 | .771 | 8.95 | 2.51 | 0.95 | 0.66 | 18.97 |
| 2015–16 | Ulsan/Atléticos | 7 | 4 | 24.4 | .453 | .250 | .833 | 7.57 | 2.71 | 1.43 | 0.71 | 16.71 |
| 2016–17 | Jeonju | 32 | 30 | 32.0 | .487 | .234 | .759 | 9.75 | 2.53 | 0.97 | 0.53 | 21.34 |
| 2016–17 | Akita | 18 | 3 | 22.2 | 58.8 | **56.4** | 77.1 | 7.3 | 1.9 | 0.6 | 0.2 | 15.8 |
| 2017–18 | Chiba | 41 | 1 | 23.1 | 47.2 | 31.2 | 74.6 | 5.7 | 2.8 | 0.8 | 0.4 | 11.1 |
| 2018–19 | Toyama | 59 | 59 | 35.25 | 50.3 | 34.1 | 78.2 | 9.0 | 3.4 | 1.0 | 0.32 | 21.8 |
| 2019–20 | Toyama | 38 | 38 | 37.3 | 46.3 | 37.6 | 83.2 | 9.6 | 4.6 | 1.6 | 0.4 | 21.3 |

=== G League Awards & Honors ===
- Performer of the Week - 3/7/2011

=== International Awards & Honors ===
- Ukrainian Superleague First Team - 2012–2013
- Ukrainian Superleague All-Semifinal Team - 2012–2013

=== Playoffs ===
| Year | Team | GP | GS | MPG | FG% | 3P% | FT% | RPG | APG | SPG | BPG | PPG |
|---|---|---|---|---|---|---|---|---|---|---|---|---|
| 2009-10 | Jarusalem | 5 | | 27.4 | .465 | .333 | .500 | 6.0 | 1.4 | 0.2 | 0.6 | 10.4 |
| 2011-12 | DAK | 2 | 0 | 14.9 | .500 | .500 | .500 | 4.00 | 1.00 | 0.50 | 0.50 | 6.50 |
| 2012-13 | Budivelnyk | 15 | | 29.3 | .540 | .409 | .771 | 6.7 | 2.3 | 0.6 | 0.7 | 17.9 |
| 2016-17 | Akita | 3 | 2 | 19.01 | .300 | .429 | 1.000 | 6.0 | 2.3 | 0 | 0.33 | 6.3 |
| 2017-18 | Chiba | 6 | 1 | 18.17 | .450 | .636 | .846 | 4.3 | 1.5 | 0.66 | 0.33 | 9.0 |
| 2018-19 | Toyama | 2 | 2 | 36.23 | .735 | .333 | .800 | 5.0 | 2.0 | 0.5 | 0 | 30.0 |

=== G League All-Star Game Stats ===
| Year | Team | GP | GS | MPG | FG% | 3P% | FT% | RPG | APG | SPG | BPG | PPG |
|---|---|---|---|---|---|---|---|---|---|---|---|---|
| 2012 | West | 1 | 1 | 21.7 | .667 | .500 | .500 | 7.00 | 2.00 | 0.00 | 0.00 | 15.00 |

=== Non-FIBA Events Stats ===
| Year | Team | GP | GS | MPG | FG% | 3P% | FT% | RPG | APG | SPG | BPG | PPG |
|---|---|---|---|---|---|---|---|---|---|---|---|---|
| 2011 | Pan American Games | 5 | | 15.37 | .522 | .667 | 1.000 | 4.0 | 1.2 | 0.00 | 0.2 | 6.6 |

=== Early cup games ===
| Year | Team | GP | GS | MPG | FG% | 3P% | FT% | RPG | APG | SPG | BPG | PPG |
|---|---|---|---|---|---|---|---|---|---|---|---|---|
| 2018 | Toyama | 2 | 2 | 27.02 | .522 | .045 | .600 | 10.5 | 2.5 | 1.0 | 0 | 16.5 |
| 2019 | Toyama | 3 | 3 | 30.32 | .576 | .692 | .778 | 8.0 | 4.3 | 0.7 | 0 | 18.0 |
