= Caleb Grill =

American basketball player (born 2000)

No. 31 – Maine Celtics
- Position: Shooting guard / point guard
- League: NBA G League

Personal information
- Born: June 15, 2000 (age 26) Wichita, Kansas, U.S.
- Listed height: 6 ft 3 in (1.91 m)
- Listed weight: 205 lb (93 kg)

Career information
- High school: Maize (Maize, Kansas)
- College: Iowa State (2019–2020); UNLV (2020–2021); Iowa State (2021–2023); Missouri (2023–2025)
- NBA draft: 2025: undrafted
- Playing career: 2025–present

Career history
- 2025–2026: Windy City Bulls
- 2026: Greensboro Swarm
- 2026: NBA G League United
- 2026–present: Maine Celtics

Career highlights
- FIBA Intercontinental Cup champion (2026); NBA G League champion (2026); SEC Sixth Man of the Year (2025)
- Stats at NBA.com
- Stats at Basketball Reference

Caleb Grill (born June 15, 2000) is an American professional basketball player for the Maine Celtics of the NBA G League. He was born and grew up in Wichita, Kansas, and graduated from Maize High School. He played college basketball for Iowa State, UNLV and Missouri.

== Early life and high school career ==
Grill is a native of Wichita, Kansas, and attended Maize High School where he played multiple sports. As a senior, he averaged 18.4 points, 4.6 rebounds and 3.4 assists per game and was chosen to The Eagle's All-State team. Grill was ranked a three-star prospect in the class of 2019 according to 247Sports. He committed to play college basketball at Iowa State over offers from South Dakota State, UNLV, Kansas State and Creighton.

== College career ==
Grill averaged 2.1 points and 1.7 rebounds per game as a freshman and made two starts. Following the season, he transferred to UNLV. Grill averaged 9.1 points, 3.2 rebounds and 2.2 assists per game. Coach T.J. Otzelberger was hired at Iowa State after the season, so Grill transferred back to the Cyclones. He averaged 6.4 points and 3.2 rebounds per game as a junior. As a senior, Grill averaged 9.5 points and 4.0 rebounds per game. He was dismissed from the team in March 2023, later revealing he had suffered from mental health issues. In April, Grill announced that he was transferring to Missouri. Grill suffered a broken wrist during his first season at Missouri, causing him to miss most of the season. In 2024–25, he averaged 13.7 points and 3.6 rebounds per game while shooting 39.6% from three-point range. Grill was named SEC Sixth Man of the Year.

== Professional career ==
On June 26, 2025, after not being selected in the 2025 NBA draft, Grill signed an Exhibit 10 deal with the Chicago Bulls. He was waived on September 26 and joined their G League affiliate the Windy City Bulls. Grill averaged 11.2 points, 3.8 rebounds and 1.4 assists per game for the Windy City Bulls. On March 7, 2026, he was acquired by the Greensboro Swarm.

In July 2026, Grill joined the Boston Celtics for the 2026 NBA Summer League, later signing an Exhibit 10 contract with the team on September 14, 2026.

In September 2026, Grill competed with NBA G League United in the 2026 FIBA Intercontinental Cup, averaging 8.3 points a game and winning the gold medal over Rytas Vilnius.
