= Sean East II =

American basketball player (born 1999)

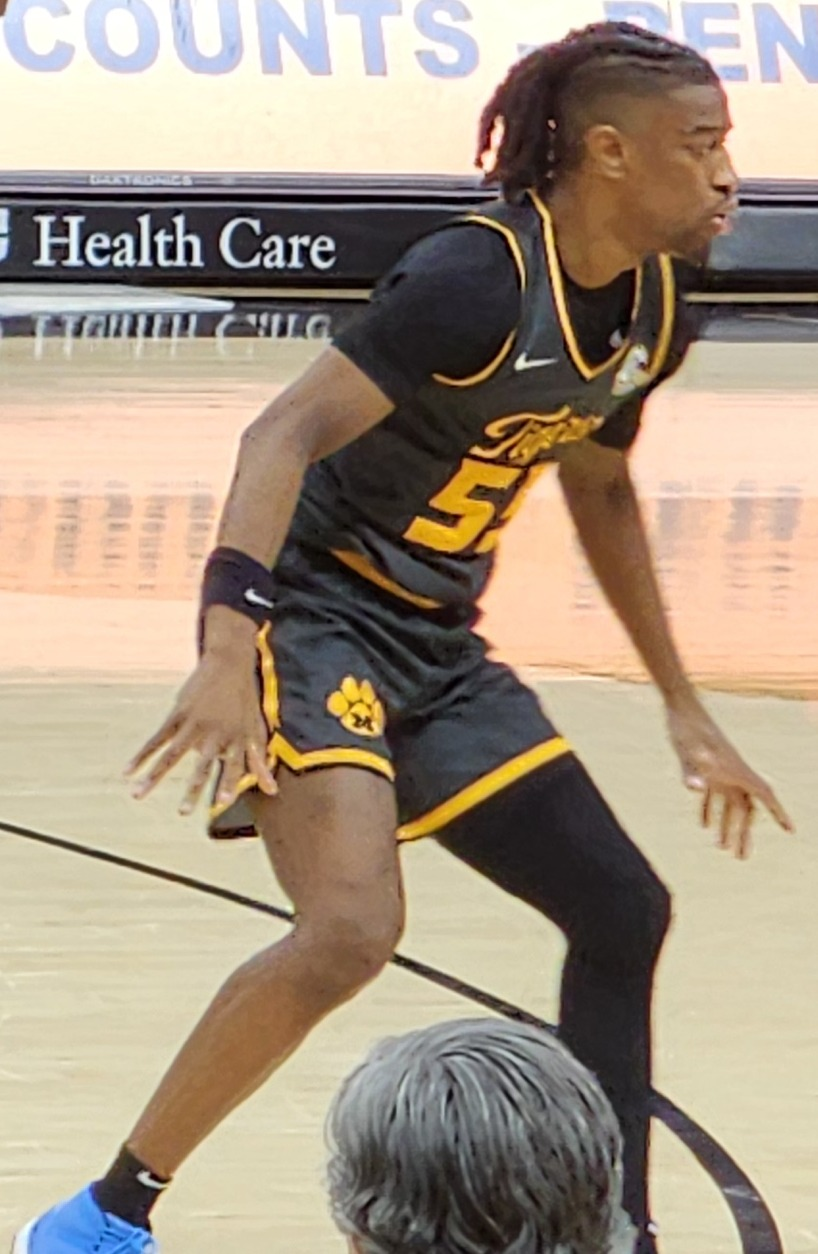
- East in 2024

No. 55 – Stockton Kings
- Position: Point guard
- League: NBA G League

Personal information
- Born: November 17, 1999 (age 26) Louisville, Kentucky, U.S.
- Listed height: 6 ft 3 in (1.91 m)
- Listed weight: 180 lb (82 kg)

Career information
- High school: New Albany (New Albany, Indiana)
- College: UMass (2019–2020); Bradley (2020–2021); John A. Logan (2021–2022); Missouri (2022–2024)
- NBA draft: 2024: undrafted
- Playing career: 2025–present

Career history
- 2025: CSM Constanța
- 2025: Edmonton Stingers
- 2025–2026: Salt Lake City Stars
- 2026: Brampton Honey Badgers
- 2026: NBA G League United
- 2026–present: Stockton Kings

Career highlights
- FIBA Intercontinental Cup champion (2026)
- Stats at NBA.com
- Stats at Basketball Reference

Sean Lovell East II (born November 17, 1999) is an American professional basketball player for the Stockton Kings of the NBA G League. He played college basketball for the UMass Minutemen, Bradley Braves and Missouri Tigers.

== Early life and high school career ==
East was born in Louisville, Kentucky, and attended New Albany High School in Indiana. As a senior, he averaged 18.2 points per game, earning recognition in the Indiana All-Stars event.

== College career ==
=== UMass (2019–2020) ===
East began his college career at the University of Massachusetts (UMass) for the 2019–20 season, averaging 9.3 points and 4.9 assists per game.

=== Bradley (2020–2021) ===
In 2020, East transferred to Bradley University, where he averaged 9.0 points and 3.7 assists per game.

=== John A. Logan (2021–2022) ===
In 2021, East transferred to John A. Logan College, where he averaged 20.9 points and 5.7 assists per game.

=== Missouri (2022–2024) ===
East later transferred to the University of Missouri, where he played for the Missouri Tigers in his final college seasons. In the 2023–24 season, he averaged 17.6 points and 4.0 assists per game. During this season, he scored a career-high 33 points against Arkansas and made a game winner against Minnesota. He was also named the SEC Scholar-Athlete of the Year.

== Professional career ==
=== CSM Constanța (2025) ===
After going undrafted in the 2024 NBA draft, East joined the Los Angeles Lakers for the 2024 NBA Summer League. On October 26, 2024, he was selected by the Cleveland Charge in the NBA G League draft and traded to the South Bay Lakers.

In February 2025, East joined the CSM Constanța of the Liga Națională. On April 26, his contract was terminated.

=== Edmonton Stingers (2025) ===
He signed with the Edmonton Stingers for the 2025 season of the Canadian Elite Basketball League. East broke the single-season scoring record of the CEBL on August 10, 2025, acquiring a total of 546 points in the final game of the 2025 season.

=== Salt Lake City Star (2025–2026) ===
He joined the Salt Lake City Stars for the 2025–26 NBA G League season, and was part of the G League's "Rising Stars" team at the 2026 All-Star Weekend. He was traded to the Stockton Kings on August 19, 2026.

=== Brampton Honey Badgers (2026) ===
East joined the Brampton Honey Badgers for the 2026 CEBL season. He was named first-team all-CEBL, averaging 23 points and 7 assists per game.

== Career highlights and awards ==
- SEC Scholar-Athlete of the Year (2024)
- NJCAA Player of the Year (2022)
- Career-high 33 points vs. Arkansas (2024)
- Career-high 9 assists vs. Yale (2019)
- CEBL Single Season Record with 546 Points (2025)

== College statistics ==
Season	Team	GP	Min	FG%	3P%	FT%	Pts	Reb	Ast
2019–20	UMass	31	28.1	39.8	32.1	78.1	9.3	2.5	4.9
2020–21	Bradley	24	28.0	42.4	34.9	83.3	9.0	3.2	3.7
2021–22	John A. Logan	33	?	53.4	41.0	88.7	20.9	4.3	5.7
2022–23	Missouri	35	23.4	44.4	22.1	83.6	7.3	2.1	2.6
2023–24	Missouri	31	30.0	51.1	45.8	85.0	17.9	3.4	4.0
