= Earl Tyree =

American baseball player (1890–1954)

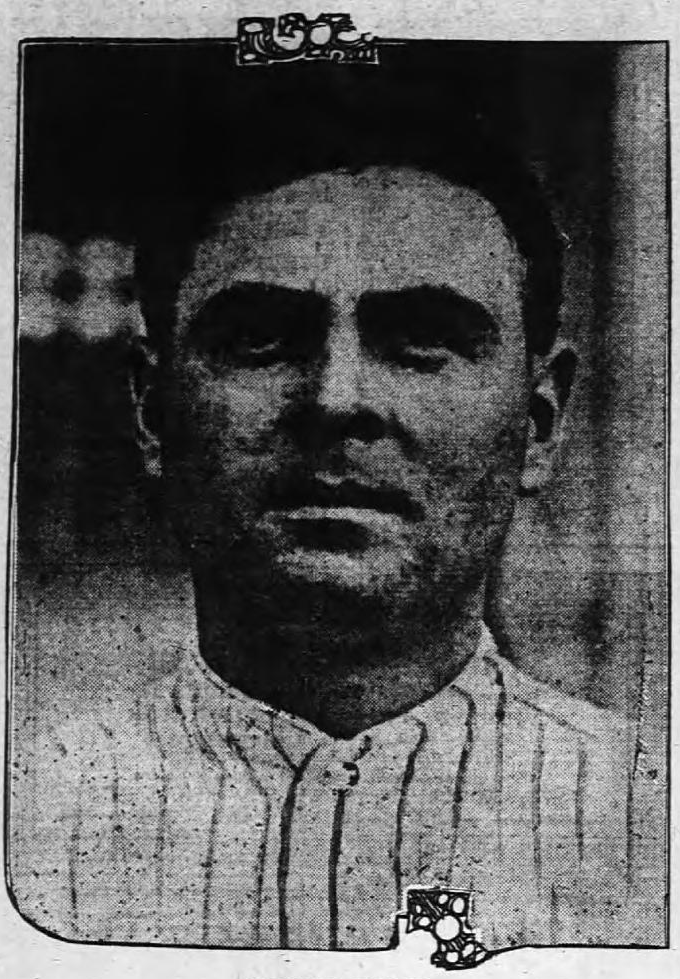
- Tyree, c. 1914
- Catcher
- Born: March 4, 1890; Huntsville, Illinois, U.S.
- Died: May 17, 1954 (aged 64); Rushville, Illinois, U.S.
- Batted: Right Threw: Right

MLB debut
- October 5, 1914, for the Chicago Cubs

Last MLB appearance
- October 5, 1914, for the Chicago Cubs

MLB statistics
- Games: 1
- At bats: 4
- Hits: 0
- Stats at Baseball Reference

Teams
- Chicago Cubs (1914)

Earl Carlton "Ty" Tyree (March 4, 1890 – May 17, 1954) was an American Major League Baseball player. Tyree played for Chicago Cubs in the 1914 season. He only played in one game in his one-year career, having no hits in four at-bats. Tyree was born in Huntsville, Illinois, and died in Rushville, Illinois.
