= Jabez T. Sunderland =

American Unitarian minister and social reformer (1842–1936

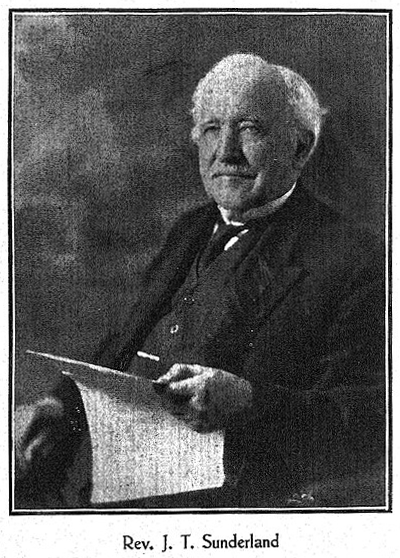

Jabez Thomas Sunderland (11 February 1842 – 13 August 1936) was a minister of the Unitarian church in the United States and an outspoken activist for human rights and anti-imperialism. He was especially involved in matters of Indian independence and wrote the book India in Bondage (1929, 1932). Among his theological writings, his most famous was The Bible: Its Origin, Growth, and Character, and Its Place Among the Sacred Books of the World (1893).

== Early life and education ==
Jabez Sunderland was born in Yorkshire in the United Kingdom to Thomas and Sarah Broadhead. When he was two, his family moved to the U.S. He was educated at the University of Chicago, receiving an AB in 1867 and a master's in 1869, followed by studies at the Baptist Union Theological Seminary where he earned a BD in 1870. Tufts University awarded him an honorary D.D. in 1914.

== Career ==
Sunderland began his ministry at a Baptist church in Milwaukee, Wisconsin, but "he soon grew restless under the restrictions of the doctrinal systems in which he had been trained." He gravitated to the Unitarian church, and held a series of pastorates across North America: at Northfield, Massachusetts (1872–1875); Chicago, Illinois (1876–1878); Ann Arbor, Michigan (1878–1898); Oakland, California (1898–1899); Toronto and Ottawa, Canada (1900–1906); Hartford, Connecticut (1906–1911); and Poughkeepsie, New York (1912–1920).

By 1880, he was co-editor of Unity magazine, which had established itself as "the voice of the more radical Unitarians in the West". In January 1886, he founded a new monthly publication, Unitarian, which he called "a magazine that should hold to our old freedom from dogmatic creeds and yet stand clearly for belief in God and worship the spirit of Christ."

Sunderland authored over 20 books, and was involved in movements to advance women's education, improve labor conditions, promote world peace, and fight against imperialism. He took particular interest in India. He was an advocate for self-governance by the Indian people. He visited the country in 1895-1896, partly to meet the leaders of the Brahmo Samaj who had impressed him. He met with Dr. Atmaram Pandurang and spoke at Fergusson College in 1895. That same year, he attended the 11th Session of the Indian National Congress in Poona. His 1929 book, India in Bondage, was published shortly after Katherine Mayo's Mother India and included an appendix rebutting some of her claims.

His wife, Eliza Read Sunderland, was a writer, educator, lecturer, and women's rights advocate. Jabez Sunderland died at his son's home on August 13, 1936. He was 94 years old.

== Selected works ==
- The Liberal Christian Ministry (1889)
- The Origin and Character of the Bible and Its Place Among Sacred Books (1893)
- Dr. Winchell's "Preadamites" (1881)
- India in Bondage: Her Right to Freedom and a Place Among the Great Nations (1929)
