= Jarin Stevenson =

American basketball player (born 2005)

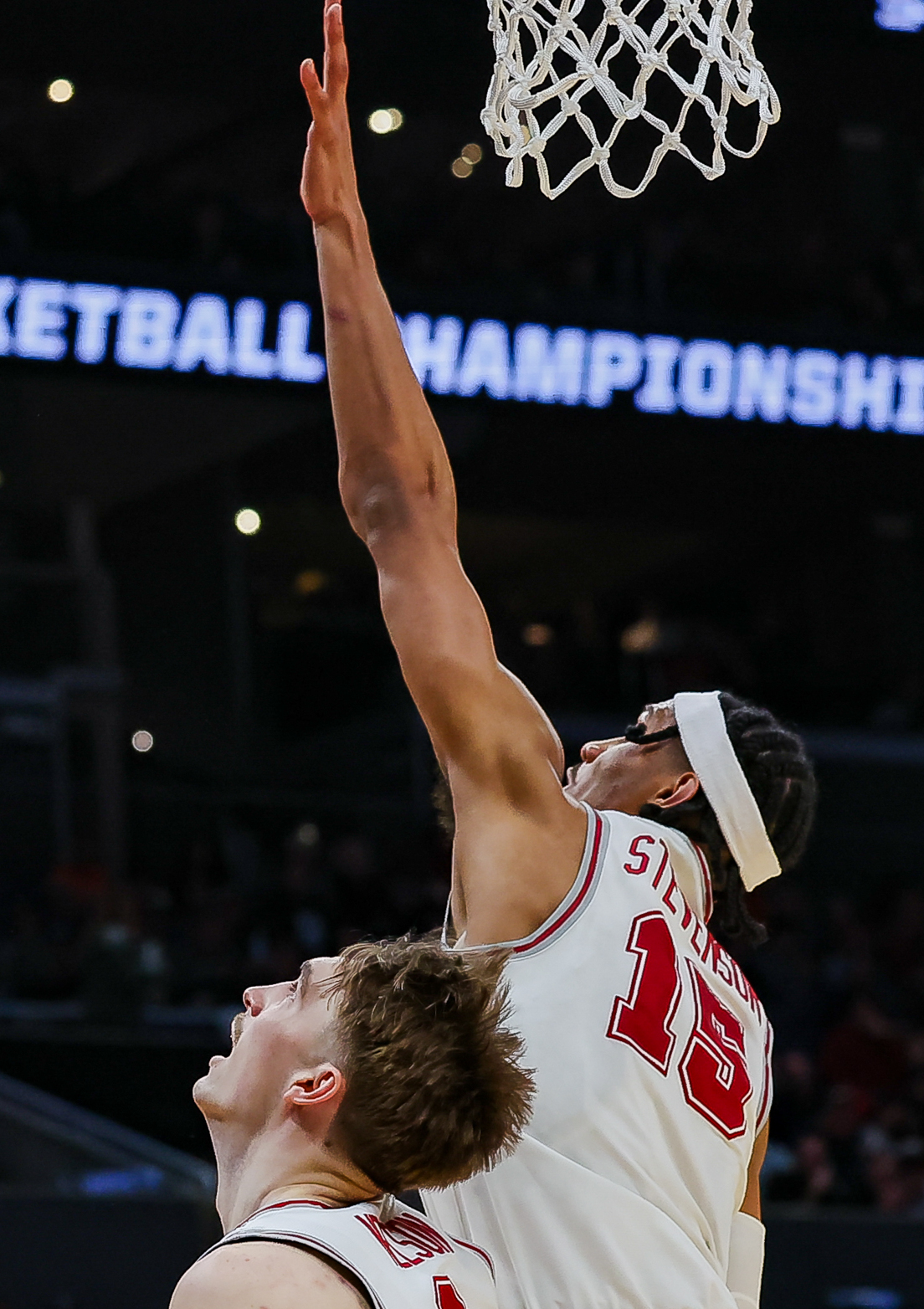

No. 15 – North Carolina Tar Heels
- Position: Power forward
- League: Atlantic Coast Conference

Personal information
- Born: October 15, 2005 (age 20) San Antonio, Texas, U.S.
- Listed height: 6 ft 10 in (2.08 m)
- Listed weight: 220 lb (100 kg)

Career information
- High school: Seaforth (Pittsboro, North Carolina)
- College: Alabama (2023–2025); North Carolina (2025–present)

Jarin Quincy Stevenson (born October 15, 2005) is an American college basketball player for the North Carolina Tar Heels of the Atlantic Coast Conference (ACC). He previously played for the Alabama Crimson Tide. His father is Moon Tae-jong (born Cameron Jaron Stevenson), a South Korean former basketball player.

== Early life ==
Stevenson was born on October 15, 2005. His father, Jarod, played professional basketball in several countries while his mother, Nicole, played for the North Carolina Tar Heels. He lived in South Korea for most of his childhood due to his father playing there, moving back to the United States in middle school. He attended Northwood High School in Pittsboro, North Carolina, as a freshman, and helped the basketball team reach the class 3-A state championship game.

Stevenson transferred to newly-opened Seaforth High School in Pittsboro as a sophomore, joining his father and mother, who were the head coach and assistant coach, respectively. In his first season there, he was named first-team all-conference and the Mid-Carolina 1A/2A Player of the Year with an average of 20.5 points, 11.3 rebounds, 3.4 blocks and 2.4 assists per game. As a junior, Stevenson was named the North Carolina Gatorade Player of the Year while helping Seaforth reach the second round of the state tournament, averaging 21.5 points, 11.6 rebounds, 3.7 blocks and 2.7 assists per game while making over 60 percent of his field goal attempts. Stevenson finished his high school career with 1,230 points scored. He also played 16 games for Team United of the Nike Elite Youth Basketball League (EYBL), averaging 12.8 points and 5.3 rebounds per game. Outside of playing, he excelled in the classroom and was second in his class with a 4.5 grade-point average (GPA).

=== Recruitment ===
Stevenson received his first athletic scholarship offer from the University of North Carolina, his mother's alma mater, prior to his sophomore season of high school. He became a highly-ranked college basketball prospect for two years and had an extensive recruiting process. His father said that "It's starting to seem like we have too many options," referring to all the different places recruiting Stevenson. By his junior year, he was ranked a five-star recruit in the class of 2024 and the top power forward nationally, as well as the 16th-best player overall, by ESPN. A 247Sports ranking placed him as the 10th-best player nationally and the top player in North Carolina. Among his offers, he narrowed down his college choices to the Alabama Crimson Tide, Virginia Cavaliers and North Carolina Tar Heels. He ultimately chose to re-classify to 2023 and commit to the Alabama Crimson Tide, graduating from high school a year early and forgoing his senior season.

== College career ==
Stevenson enrolled at Alabama in time for the 2023–24 season. He made his debut in the team's season-opening win against Morehead State, scoring 12 points. As a sophomore, Stevenson averaged 5.4 points and 3.4 rebounds per game. Following the season, he transferred to North Carolina.

== Career statistics ==
Legend
GP	Games played	GS	Games started	MPG	Minutes per game
FG%	Field goal percentage	3P%	3-point field goal percentage	FT%	Free throw percentage
RPG	Rebounds per game	APG	Assists per game	SPG	Steals per game
BPG	Blocks per game	PPG	Points per game	**Bold**	Career high

=== College ===
Year	Team	GP	GS	MPG	FG%	3P%	FT%	RPG	APG	SPG	BPG	PPG
2023–24	Alabama	**37**	5	16.6	.418	**.317**	.689	2.7	.4	.2	.4	5.3
2024–25	Alabama	**37**	22	18.7	.429	.307	.597	3.4	.8	.5	.6	5.4
2025–26	North Carolina	33	**25**	**25.7**	**.470**	.295	**.742**	**4.4**	**.9**	**.6**	**.7**	**8.1**
Career		107	52	20.1	.441	.307	.684	3.5	.7	.4	.5	6.2
