= Eliza R. Sunderland =

American writer, educator, lecturer and women's rights advocate

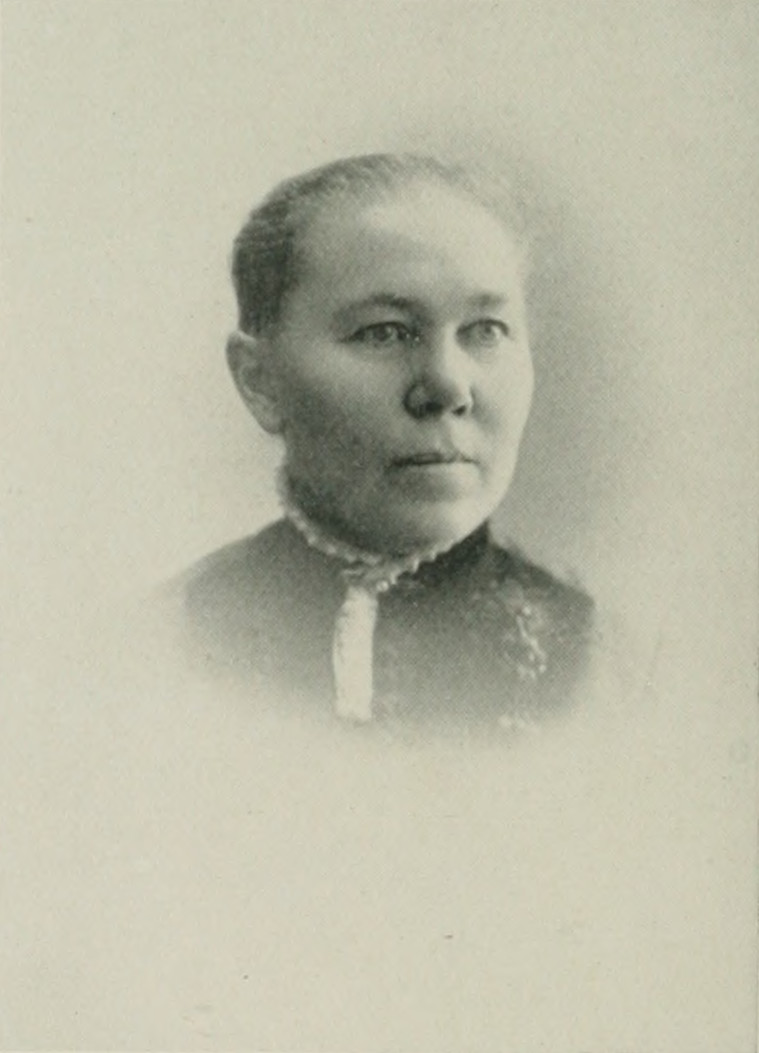
- Photo in A Woman of the Century
- Born: Eliza Jane Read; April 19, 1839 Huntsville, Illinois, U.S.
- Died: March 3, 1910 (aged 70) Hartford, Connecticut
- Occupation: writer, educator, lecturer, and women's rights advocate
- Education: Ph.D., 1892
- Alma mater: Mount Holyoke Seminary; University of Michigan
- Spouse: Jabez T. Sunderland (m. 1871)
- Children: 3

Eliza R. Sunderland (née, Read; April 19, 1839 – March 3, 1910) was an American writer, educator, lecturer, and women's rights advocate of the long nineteenth century. She was a prolific writer for literary and religious papers and magazines. She was also prominent in her religious denomination, no woman in the country being called upon more often than Sunderland for addresses at local, state, and national Unitarian gatherings. She was one of the organizers and the first president of the Western Women's Conference. At the Parliament of the World's Religions in Chicago, in 1893, she represented the Unitarian women of the U.S. and gave one of the most notable addresses of the parliament. She was especially well-fitted to serve as a member of the board of school visitors in Hartford, Connecticut on account of her lifelong interest in school matters, her experience as a teacher, and her intellectual training.

== Early life and education ==
Eliza Jane Read was born in Huntsville, Illinois, April 19, 1839. Her father was Amasa Read, a native of Worcester County, Massachusetts, who removed to Illinois in 1838 as one of the earliest pioneer settlers in the central-western part of the State. Her mother, whose maiden name was Jane Henderson, was born in Ohio, of Scotch ancestry, and was a woman of remarkably vigorous mind and noble character. There were three children born to the parents, who reached adult years: Eliza and two younger brothers, Thomas H. and James M. Read. The mother was widowed when the children were very young, leaving her to endure alone the hardships of pioneer life, of which she made her children's education a priority.

Until the age of ten, Sunderland attended the village school, 1 mile (1.6 km) away. Then, for the purpose of obtaining greater educational advantages, the family removed first to St. Mary, Illinois and then to Abingdon, Illinois. Sunderland's years from 16 to 24 were spent partly in study in Abingdon Seminary and partly in teaching school. At the age of 24, she entered Mount Holyoke Seminary, in Massachusetts, at that time the most advanced school for young women in the country; she was graduated from that institution in 1865.

Sunderland's highest ambition was realized when, on graduation day, she was invited to return as a teacher, but circumstances at home prevented her doing so.

== Career and further education ==
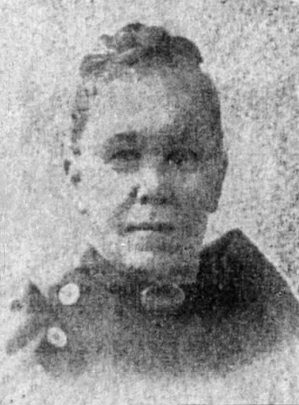
undated photo in obituary

After graduation, Sunderland became a teacher in the high school in Aurora, Illinois, where quickly, she made principal, holding that position during the period of 1866–71. In 1871, in Milwaukee, Wisconsin, she married Rev. Jabez T. Sunderland, a clergyman, first in the Baptist faith, and then Unitarian. They were the parents of two daughters, including Florence; and a son, Edson. From 1872 to 1875, Sunderland's home was in Northfield, Massachusetts, then three years in Chicago, Illinois, and in 1878, the family removed to Ann Arbor, Michigan. During the period of 1877–98, she worked as a teacher in the high schools of Chicago and Ann Arbor. As a high school teacher and principal, her specialties were Latin, English literature and history.

Sunderland was always very active in the work which commonly falls upon a minister's wife. She affiliated with the Women's Western Unitarian Conference (president, 1882–87) as well as the National Alliance of Unitarian and Other Liberal Christian Women. She held many positions of honor in the Unitarian denomination, being one of the best known of its women speakers in its national and local gatherings. Though not an ordained minister, she preached and lectured extensively having more calls to preach and lecture than she could fill. Sunderland appeared in the pulpit and one winter, while a resident of Ann Arbor, where her husband was pastor of the Unitarian Church, she took charge of every evening service for the season, while her husband occupied the pulpit Sunday mornings. During this time, she gave a series of 28 lectures on "Religious Thought of the Great Thinkers of the Nineteenth Century", her specific subjects being Haeckel, Goethe, Emerson, Browning, Tennyson, and others.

At the same time, she carried forward her literary studies, having taken nearly or quite every philosophical course offered in the University of Michigan, and many of the literary, historical and politico-economic courses. In 1889, she received from the university the degree of Ph.B., and in 1892, the degree of Ph.D. Her post-graduate work in the University of Michigan was mainly in philosophy and psychology, the subject of her thesis for her Ph.D. being "The Relation of the Philosophy of Kant to that of Hegel". She was a thorough student of Browning, and often gave addresses, papers and lectures on Browning's writings. She was a no less careful student of Henrik Ibsen, on whose dramas she often spoke.

Sunderland was for a number of years an active worker in the National Association for the Advancement of Women (director, 1885–95) In 1893, she was a prominent speaker at the World's Parliament of Religions and at the World's Congress of Representative Women.

In 1878, Sunderland served as associate editor of the Illinois Social Science Journal, Chicago. She was the author of Stories from Genesis, 1890; Heroes and Heroines, 1895; and Centennial Memorial to James Martineau, 1905, the last being an extended summary and re-statement of the theistic philosophy of Martineau. At the request of leaders in the Unitarian denomination, she prepared three volumes of selections on religious lines. She was the author of several Sunday school manuals which had wide use, and of a number of pamphlets on religious and educational subjects.

Sunderland traveled extensively, having been abroad twice, once for three months and once for thirteen months, the last time extending her travels to Greece, Egypt and Palestine. She also traveled to India.

== Later life ==
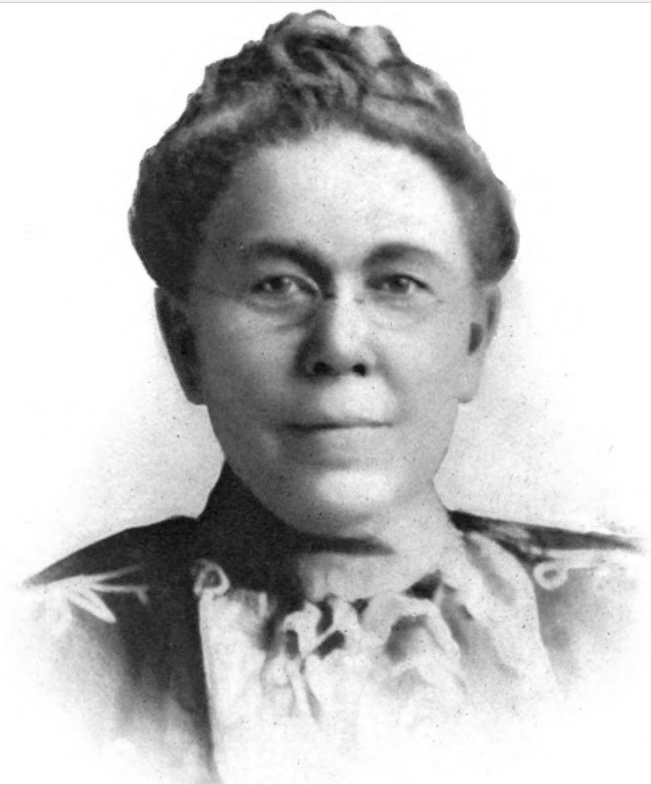
undated

Her married life, before coming to Hartford, Connecticut, was spent in Milwaukee, Wisconsin; Northfield, Massachusetts; Chicago, Illinois; Ann Arbor, Michigan; and Toronto, Canada, where her husband held pastorates. In each, she was a leader in literary circles and in many movements for the betterment of the community. She came to Hartford in October 1906, and was very active in religious, philanthropic, literary, and educational work, both in connection with Unity church and outside. During her three and a half years resident in Hartford, she gave many addresses on literary, educational and religious subjects before women's societies in different churches of the city, the Motherhood Club, the College Club, the Equal Rights Association, the Women's Christian Temperance Union, and other organizations. She also went often to Springfield, Illinois; New Haven, Connecticut; New York City; Philadelphia; and other places to speak on similar themes. She spoke several times at the Capitol building before the Legislature or legislative committees, at public hearing on important questions concerning education, temperance, or the special interests of women and children, which were before the Legislature for its consideration and action. In 1908, she was elected a member of the board of school visitors of Hartford.

== Death and legacy ==
Sunderland was engaged in the preparation of four new Ibsen lectures at the time she was stricken down by her last illness, of heart disease. She died at her home in Hartford, March 3, 1910. Eliza Read Sunderland - a brief sketch of her life : memorial addresses. was published in 1912.

== Selected works ==
- Stories from Genesis, 1890
- Heroes and Heroines, 1895
- James Martineau and his greatest book - A Centennial Tribute, 1905 (with Jabez Thomas Sunderland)
