= Weinberg-King State Park =

State park in Schuyler County, Illinois

Weinberg-King State Fish and Wildlife Area
- IUCN category III (natural monument or feature)
- Location within Illinois Location within the United States
- Location: Schuyler County, Illinois, USA
- Nearest city: Augusta, Illinois
- Coordinates: 40°14′08″N 90°53′49″W
- Area: 772 acres (312 ha)
- Established: May 1968
- Governing body: Illinois Department of Natural Resources

Weinberg-King State Fish and Wildlife Area is an Illinois state park on 772 acres (312 ha) in Schuyler County, Illinois, United States. It is located near Augusta, Illinois.

== Geology and history ==
Weinberg-King State Fish and Wildlife Area is located on the western edge of a large plain of glacial till left behind by the ice sheets of the Illinois Glaciation, which spanned from 300,000 to 125,000 years before the present. Because the park is at the edge of the till plain, the park's streams, especially Williams Creek, have eroded down through the till to a bed of Pennsylvanian sandstone.

The park is based on a 500 acres (200 ha) parcel of open space formerly owned by the Weinberg-King family, who donated the land to the state of Illinois in 1968.

== Today ==
The park is administered by the Illinois Department of Natural Resources. Ponds in the park have many beautiful creatures such as bass, bluegill, and catfish. There are nearly 30 miles of trails maintained within the park. The park offers resources for upland game and bird hunting, including squirrels, doves, quail, rabbits, woodcock, white-tailed deer, and wild turkey.

Illinois Route 101 passes through the park.
