= Southeastern High School (Illinois) =

High school in Augusta, Illinois, United States

Location
- Augusta, Illinois Hancock County, Illinois United States
- Coordinates: 40°13′39.2″N 90°57′5.5″W

District information
- Grades: 9-12
- Superintendent: D. Todd Fox

Students and staff
- Students: 122
- Athletic conference: West Central Conference
- District mascot: Suns
- Colors: Royal Blue and gold

Other information
- Website: www.southeastern337.com/jr__sr_high_school

Southeastern High School (Now called Southeastern Jr/Sr High School) is located in Augusta, Illinois. The principal is Tim Kerr and the Athletic Director is Cyle Riggs. The school's mascots are the Suns and the Lady Suns.

Currently, the Suns are co-oping some sports with local Central Camp Point. The teams co-oping are:

- Central-Southeastern Girls basketball (The CSE Lady Panthers)

Ended co-op:

- Central-Southeastern football (The CSE Panthers)
- Central-Southeastern baseball (The Suns)

== History ==
The building was constructed in 1920, and was home to the Augusta Redskins until the 1970s, when the school consolidated with Bowen High School to become the Southeastern Suns. In the early 1990s, Plymouth High School, located in Plymouth, Illinois completed the consolidation to make Southeastern High School a public facility serving students from the three villages and other outlying areas.

On March 3, 2006, Southeastern High School was burnt to the ground after a fire that started in the Chemistry lab on the third floor, completely gutted the entire floor, resulting in floor collapse, and extensive water damage to the bottom floors. The fire started at approximately 11:30 AM, during the students' lunch time/study hall. As a result, no student or faculty member was injured. Firefighters from six area units assisted in the task of extinguishing the flames. Firefighters persisted in their mission until early morning hours.

After taking the following Monday and Tuesday off school, Southeastern High School classes reconvened at Southeastern Jr. High School in Bowen, Illinois and at the Bowen United Methodist Church, both just six miles away from the original Augusta location.

On May 21, 2006, 45 seniors, previously unsure of their future at Southeastern, celebrated their graduation in the gymnasium at the Augusta campus, less than three months after the destructive fire. The graduation was the most attended in recent memory, attracting much attention from around the surrounding area.

The new school was completed in 2008.
