= Brooklyn, Schuyler County, Illinois =

Brooklyn, Illinois
- Unincorporated community
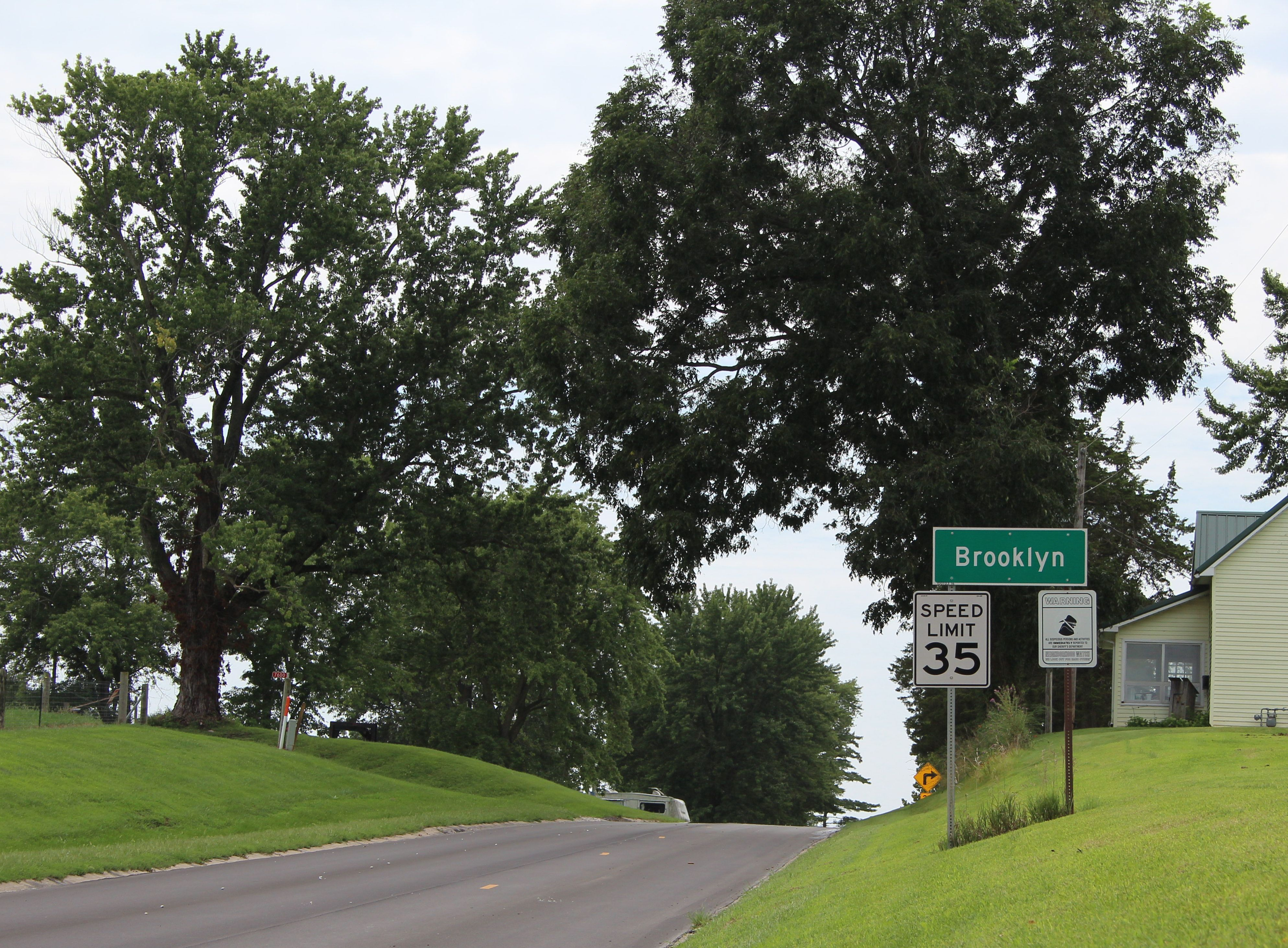
- Northern approach to Brooklyn on Illinois 101

- Location within Illinois Location within the United States
- Coordinates: 40°13′33″N 90°45′47″W
- Country: United States
- State: Illinois
- County: Schuyler
- Township: Brooklyn
- Elevation: 551 ft (168 m)
- Time zone: UTC-6 (Central (CST))
  - Summer (DST): UTC-5 (CDT)
- Area code: 217
- GNIS feature ID: 404911

Brooklyn is an unincorporated community in Schuyler County, Illinois, United States. Brooklyn is located on Illinois Route 101, 7.5 miles (12.1 km) west of Littleton.
