= Piper High School (Kansas) =

Location
- 13021 Leavenworth Rd; Kansas City, Kansas 66109; United States; 39.166332°N 94.828126°W

Information
- Type: Public high school
- School district: Piper USD 203
- CEEB code: 172400
- Principal: Justin Bogart
- Staff: 54.85 (FTE)
- Grades: 9 to 12
- Gender: Co-educational
- Enrollment: 817 (2023–2024)
- Student to teacher ratio: 14.90
- Campus type: Urban
- Colors: Purple; White
- Slogan: "It's Always a Great Day to be a Pirate!"
- Fight song: Boosting the Old High School
- Athletics: Class 5A, East District
- Athletics conference: United Kansas Conference
- Mascot: Pirate
- Team name: Piper Pirates
- Rival: Basehor-Linwood High School; Bonner Springs High School
- Publication: KC Piper News
- Newspaper: The Pirates' Log
- Website: phs.piperschools.com; www.pipernationnews.com; www.piratesnation.org

Piper High School is a public high school in Piper, Kansas City, Kansas, United States. It is operated by Piper USD 203 school district, and serves students of grades 9 to 12. This school is one of multiple high schools located in Kansas City. Piper High School serves a learning community of 570 students. Piper High is the only high school in USD 203, which encompasses 32 square miles of Western Wyandotte County in Kansas City, Kansas. The student population of USD 203 is 1800 students. Piper High School is a member of the Kansas State High School Activities Association and offers a variety of sports programs. Athletic teams compete in the 4A division and are known as the Piper Pirates. Extracurricular activities are also offered in the form of performing arts, school publications, and clubs.

== 2002 plagiarism controversy ==
In 2002, Piper High School was thrust into the national spotlight when biology teacher Christine Pelton gave a failing grade to 28 students—almost one fourth of the sophomore class—for plagiarism on their term papers. The issue became very divisive, with some lauding the teacher for dealing with academic misconduct, while others felt that the offending students should not be left with black marks that could hurt their college prospects. The school board was under pressure from many parents of the students in question. Pelton ultimately resigned after being ordered by the school board to reduce the weighting of the failing grades.

That February, Pelton was interviewed by Aaron Brown on CNN NewsNight.

== Education ==
Piper High School (Kansas) is the top performing school in the metro area, based on state math and reading assessments as of May 22, 2016. Piper High once again was awarded the Standard of Excellence by the Kansas Board of Education for excellence in Math and Reading. ACT results remain in the top 10% of all metro schools, and continue to improve. Piper High's Kansas State Math and Reading performance is the highest of ALL high schools classified 4A - 6A in the state of Kansas. Piper High students have the opportunity to take a rigorous curriculum, which includes Advanced Placement courses as well as dual-credit community college courses. Seniors are eligible to graduate with as many as 26 college hours that they have earned through the dual-credit program at Piper High School.

Piper High School is the highest performing school in the state in 4A, 5A and 6A. Piper High School is also ranked in the top 1% of all high schools 1A - 6A in the state of Kansas based on assessment performance. Sumner Academy of Arts and Science ranked number 1 in the State of Kansas and 69th in the nation in 2009 for best High Schools in America with college ready students. Piper USD 203 shares Wyandotte County with three other school districts: Kansas City, Kansas USD 500, Bonner Springs USD 204, and Turner USD 202.

== Extracurricular activities ==
The extracurricular activities offered at Piper High School are small and fairly limited due to the school's modest size. The Pirates are classified as a 4A school by the Kansas State High School Activities Association. The school offers a well-rounded debate and forensics season. Throughout its history, Piper has won two state championships in baseball. The Piper Pirates 2012–2013 football team won its first regional bracket, losing to Eudora in the state semifinals. Eudora then lost to Holton at the state championship.

=== Athletics ===
The Piper Pirate is the school's mascot.

==== State championships ====
State championships
Season	Sport	Number of championships	Year
Spring	Baseball	2	1984, 1988
Spring	Softball	1	1994
Spring	Boys golf	8	1902, 1910, 1915, 1928, 1987, 1988, 1999, 2012
Spring	Boys basketball	3	2000, 2001, 2019
Spring	Girls track and field	5	2008, 2009, 2010, 2011, 2012
Total		19	

== Notable alumni ==
- Tamar Bates (2019 – transferred), guard in the NBA for the Utah Jazz
- Cooper Beebe (2019), offensive lineman for the Dallas Cowboys
- Leo Lyons (2005 – transferred), basketball player who played overseas
- Eric Stonestreet (1989), Emmy-winning actor (Modern Family, CSI:Crime Scene Investigation)

== See also ==
- List of high schools in Kansas
- List of unified school districts in Kansas
