= Tamar Bates =

American basketball player (born 2003)

No. 20 – Salt Lake City Stars
- Position: Shooting guard
- League: NBA G League

Personal information
- Born: February 21, 2003 (age 23) Kansas City, Kansas, U.S.
- Listed height: 6 ft 4 in (1.93 m)
- Listed weight: 195 lb (88 kg)

Career information
- High school: Piper (Piper, Kansas); IMG Academy (Bradenton, Florida)
- College: Indiana (2021–2023); Missouri (2023–2025)
- NBA draft: 2025: undrafted
- Playing career: 2025–present

Career history
- 2025–2026: Grand Rapids Gold
- 2026–present: Salt Lake City Stars
- Stats at NBA.com
- Stats at Basketball Reference

Tamar Marseis Bates (born February 21, 2003) is an American professional basketball player for the Salt Lake City Stars of the NBA G League. He played college basketball for the Indiana Hoosiers and the Missouri Tigers.

== High school career ==
Bates attended his first three seasons at Piper High School, where he won a state championship as a sophomore, before transferring to IMG Academy for his senior year. A consensus four-star recruit, he initially committed to playing college basketball for Texas before flipping his commitment to play for Indiana.

== College career ==
=== Indiana ===
During his freshman season in 2021–22, he played in 32 games, averaging 3.9 points and 1.3 rebounds in 14.5 minutes per game. In the 2022–23 season, Bates played in all 35 games while making two starts, averaging 6.1 points, 1.6 rebounds and 1.1 assists per game, while shooting 37.4% from three and 92.6% on free throws. After the conclusion of the 2022–23 season, he decided to enter his name into the NCAA transfer portal.

=== Missouri ===
Bates transferred to play for Missouri. During his first season with the Tigers in 2023–24, he averaged 13.5 points, three rebounds and 1.3 assists per game while shooting 49.5% from the field, 38.5% from the 3-point line and 92.6% from the free throw line. On December 8, 2024, Bates notched 29 points in an upset win over rival Kansas. On January 18, 2025, he notched 1,000 career points, after scoring 15 in a victory against Arkansas. On January 25, 2025, he put up 26 points in a victory over Ole Miss. On February 19, 2025, Bates tallied 13 points and four steals in an upset win over #4 Alabama. In the second round of the 2025 SEC men's basketball tournament, he recorded 25 points in a victory versus Mississippi State. Bates finished the 2024–25 season, averaging 13.3 points, 2.6 rebounds, 1.3 steals and one assist per game, as a team captain. After the conclusion of the 2024–25 season, he entered his name into the 2025 NBA draft, while also participating in the NBA scouting combine, and multiple camps. Bates also participated in the 2025 NABC DI All-Star Game, where he scored 11 points en route to a victory.

== Professional career ==
=== Grand Rapids Gold (2025–2026) ===
On June 26, 2025, after going undrafted in the 2025 NBA draft, Bates signed a two-way contract with the Denver Nuggets, splitting time with the Grand Rapids Gold of the NBA G League. On December 22, it was announced that Bates would miss at least 12 weeks after undergoing surgery to repair a fracture in his left foot. On March 4, 2026, Bates was waived by the Nuggets following the signing of David Roddy. He never appeared in a game for the Nuggets and only played in one game for Grand Rapids.

=== Salt Lake City Stars (2026–present) ===
On July 3, 2026, Bates signed a two-way contract with the Utah Jazz, splitting time with their NBA G League affiliate, the Salt Lake City Stars.

== Career statistics ==
Legend
GP	Games played	GS	Games started	MPG	Minutes per game
FG%	Field goal percentage	3P%	3-point field goal percentage	FT%	Free throw percentage
RPG	Rebounds per game	APG	Assists per game	SPG	Steals per game
BPG	Blocks per game	PPG	Points per game	**Bold**	Career high

*	Led NCAA Division I

=== College ===
Year	Team	GP	GS	MPG	FG%	3P%	FT%	RPG	APG	SPG	BPG	PPG
2021–22	Indiana	32	0	14.5	.338	.298	.833	1.3	.6	.3	.1	3.9
2022–23	Indiana	**35**	2	20.4	.392	.374	.926	1.6	1.1	.5	.1	6.1
2023–24	Missouri	32	25	**27.3**	.495	.385	.926	**3.0**	**1.3**	.8	**.2**	**13.5**
2024–25	Missouri	34	**34**	26.0	**.508**	**.397**	**.946***	2.6	1.0	**1.3**	.1	13.3
Career		133	61	22.1	.456	.373	.924	2.1	1.0	.7	.1	9.2
