= Augusta, Illinois =

- Village
- Location of Augusta in Hancock County, Illinois.

- Location in Illinois Augusta (the United States) Augusta (North America)
- Coordinates: 40°13′51″N 90°57′00″W
- Country: United States
- State: Illinois
- County: Hancock
- Named for: Augusta, Georgia

Area
  - Total: 0.69 sq mi (1.79 km^{2})
  - Land: 0.69 sq mi (1.79 km^{2})
  - Water: 0 sq mi (0.00 km^{2})
- Elevation: 669 ft (204 m)

Population (2020)
  - Total: 553
  - Density: 800.1/sq mi (308.91/km^{2})
- Time zone: UTC-6 (CST)
  - Summer (DST): UTC-5 (CDT)
- ZIP Code(s): 62311
- Area code(s): 217, 447
- FIPS code: 17-02986
- GNIS feature ID: 2398008

Augusta is a village in southeast Hancock County, Illinois, United States. The population was 553 at the 2020 census. It is located near Weinberg-King State Park.

== History ==
Augusta was founded in 1832 by Joel Catlin and W.D. Abernathy, who was the village's first postmaster. Catlin named Augusta after having a memorable visit to Augusta, Georgia.

On September 18, 1858, soon-to-be President Abraham Lincoln visited Augusta, where he gave a speech and stayed at the home of Elder James Stark. Previously, Lincoln's opponent in the historic Lincoln–Douglas debates, Stephen A. Douglas, had spoken in Augusta. In 1864, Congressman James Garfield (the future president) spoke in Augusta on behalf of Lincoln. Other notable visitors include William McKinley and Theodore Roosevelt in the fall of 1900. Only Roosevelt gave a short speech on his trip through Augusta during the campaign.

== Geography ==
Augusta is located in southeastern Hancock County. Illinois Route 61 passes through the village, leaving to the west as Main Street and to the north as Center Street; Bowen is 6 miles (10 km) to the west, and Plymouth is 5 miles (8 km) to the north. Augusta's Main Street continues east from the center of town as Illinois Route 101, leading 3 miles (5 km) to Weinberg-King State Park and 15 miles (24 km) to Littleton.

According to the 2021 census gazetteer files, Augusta has a total area of 0.69 square miles (1.79 km^{2}), all land.

== Demographics ==
Historical population
Census	Pop.	Note	%±
1880	1,015		—
1890	1,077		6.1%
1900	1,149		6.7%
1910	1,146		−0.3%
1920	1,085		−5.3%
1930	1,011		−6.8%
1940	972		−3.9%
1950	945		−2.8%
1960	915		−3.2%
1970	824		−9.9%
1980	764		−7.3%
1990	614		−19.6%
2000	657		7.0%
2010	587		−10.7%
2020	553		−5.8%
U.S. Decennial Census

As of the 2020 census there were 553 people, 275 households, and 125 families residing in the village. The population density was 800.29 inhabitants per square mile (308.99/km^{2}). There were 293 housing units at an average density of 424.02 per square mile (163.72/km^{2}). The racial makeup of the village was 96.02% White, 0.36% African American, 0.18% Native American, 0.00% Asian, 0.00% Pacific Islander, 0.18% from other races, and 3.25% from two or more races. Hispanic or Latino of any race were 0.36% of the population.

There were 275 households, out of which 20.4% had children under the age of 18 living with them, 38.18% were married couples living together, 5.45% had a female householder with no husband present, and 54.55% were non-families. 48.00% of all households were made up of individuals, and 13.82% had someone living alone who was 65 years of age or older. The average household size was 3.23 and the average family size was 2.20.

The village's age distribution consisted of 26.9% under the age of 18, 8.3% from 18 to 24, 14% from 25 to 44, 32.9% from 45 to 64, and 17.9% who were 65 years of age or older. The median age was 45.3 years. For every 100 females, there were 100.3 males. For every 100 females age 18 and over, there were 78.9 males.

The median income for a household in the village was $36,921, and the median income for a family was $65,179. Males had a median income of $41,875 versus $32,431 for females. The per capita income for the village was $21,274. About 6.4% of families and 13.6% of the population were below the poverty line, including 8.6% of those under age 18 and 2.8% of those age 65 or over.

== Events ==
Every year in July, Augusta plays host to the Hancock County Fair.

== Education ==
Southeastern High School is located in Augusta.
