= Huntsville, Illinois =

- Unincorporated community
- Location within Illinois Location within the United States
- Coordinates: 40°11′28″N 90°51′52″W
- Country: United States
- State: Illinois
- County: Peoria
- Elevation: 659 ft (201 m)
- Time zone: UTC-6 (Central (CST))
  - Summer (DST): UTC-5 (CDT)
- ZIP code: 62344
- Area code: 217
- GNIS feature ID: 410702

Huntsville is an unincorporated community in Schuyler County, Illinois, United States. Huntsville is southeast of Augusta. Huntsville had a post office, which closed on September 18, 2004.

== Notable people ==
- Eliza Read Sunderland (1839–1910), writer, educator, lecturer, women's rights advocate; born in Huntsville
- Chicago Cubs catcher Earl Tyree was born in Huntsville.
