= 2026 FIBA Intercontinental Cup =

36th edition of the FIBA Intercontinental Cup in 2026

Tournament details
- Host country: China
- City: Beijing
- Dates: 22–27 September
- Teams: 6
- Venue: 1

Final positions
- Champions: (USA Basketball) NBA G League United (1st title)
- Runners-up: (Lithuanian Basketball Federation) Rytas
- Third place: (Argentine Basketball Confederation) Boca Juniors
- Fourth place: (Rwanda Basketball Federation) RSSB Tigers

Tournament statistics
- Games played: 11
- MVP: Eric Dixon (NBA G League United)
- Top scorer: Craig Randall II (RSSB Tigers, 25.7 ppg)

Official website
- 2026 FIBA Intercontinental Cup

The 2026 FIBA Intercontinental Cup is the 36th edition of the FIBA Intercontinental Cup. The tournament is hosted at the National Indoor Stadium in Beijing under a three-year agreement with the Chinese government. It is the fourth time the tournament is hosted in Asia.

== Teams ==
Contrary to previous seasons, the Basketball Champions League Asia was not played in the 2025–26 season as entry way for Asian teams. FIBA selected the Beijing Royal Fighters and Shanghai Sharks as Asian representatives. The lineup was announced by FIBA on 8 August 2026.

Location of teams of the 2026 FIBA Intercontinental Cup

Team	Qualification	Date of qualification	Participations (bold indicates winners)	Ref.
(Argentine Basketball Confederation) Boca Juniors	Winners of the 2025–26 Basketball Champions League Americas	19 April 2026	Debut	
(Lithuania) Rytas	Winners of the 2025–26 Basketball Champions League	9 May 2026	Debut	
(Rwanda) RSSB Tigers	Winners of the 2026 BAL season	1 June 2026	Debut	
(China) Beijing Royal Fighters	Host	8 August 2026	Debut	
(China) Shanghai Sharks	Winners of the 2025–26 Chinese Basketball Association season	8 August 2026	Debut	
(USA Basketball) NBA G League United	Representative of the NBA G League	8 August 2026	2 (2024, 2025)	

== Group stage ==
All times are local (UTC+08:00)

=== Group A ===
Pos	Team	Pld	W	L	PF	PA	PD	Pts	Qualification
1	(Lithuanian Basketball Federation) Rytas	2	2	0	214	155	+59	4	Advance to semifinals
2	(Rwanda Basketball Federation) RSSB Tigers	2	1	1	206	222	−16	3	Advance to semifinals
3	(Chinese Basketball Association (organisation)) Shanghai Sharks	2	0	2	181	224	−43	2	Qualification to fifth place game

Source: FIBA

22 September
15:30

Boxscore

Rytas (Lithuanian Basketball Federation)	107–89	(Rwanda Basketball Federation) RSSB Tigers
Scoring by quarter: 18–19, 26–20, 35–20, 28–30
Pts: Bruhnke 22; Rebs: Bruhnke, Lindo 9 Asts: Devoe 8		Pts: Randall 20; Rebs: Galloway 8 Asts: Jackson 6

National Indoor Stadium
Referees: Ariadna Chueca (ESP), Ruben Woolcock (AUS), Sun Jian (CHN)

23 September
15:30

Boxscore

Shanghai Sharks (Chinese Basketball Association (organisation))	115–117 (OT)	(Rwanda Basketball Federation) RSSB Tigers
Scoring by quarter: 30–17, 30–29, 25–25, 18–32, Overtime: 12–14
Pts: Goodwin 37; Rebs: three players 5 Asts: Goodwin, Zhang 4		Pts: Randall 30; Rebs: Lenard 7 Asts: Randall, Jackson 5

National Indoor Stadium
Referees: Julio Anaya (PAN), Julirys Guzman (PUR), Arnold Moseya (RSA)

24 September
15:30

Boxscore

Rytas (Lithuanian Basketball Federation)	107–66	(Chinese Basketball Association (organisation)) Shanghai Sharks
Scoring by quarter: 25–24, 30–20, 27–7, 25–15
Pts: Masiulis 17; Rebs: Gudaitis 13; Asts: Winston 6		Pts: Wang Z.L. 14; Rebs: Cui X.L. 6 Asts: Yuan T.W. 7

National Indoor Stadium
Referees: Takaki Kato (JPN), Alan dos Santos (BRA), Petar Pešić (SRB)

=== Group B ===
Pos	Team	Pld	W	L	PF	PA	PD	Pts	Qualification
1	(USA Basketball) NBA G League United	2	2	0	198	163	+35	4	Advance to semifinals
2	(Argentine Basketball Confederation) Boca Juniors	2	1	1	162	157	+5	3	Advance to semifinals
3	(Chinese Basketball Association (organisation)) Beijing Royal Fighters	2	0	2	167	207	−40	2	Qualification to fifth place game

Source: FIBA

22 September
19:30

Boxscore

Beijing Royal Fighters (Chinese Basketball Association (organisation))	78–88	(Argentine Basketball Confederation) Boca Juniors
Scoring by quarter: 22–24, 13–27, 17–17, 26–20
Pts: Riller 24; Rebs: Nix 6 Asts: Zhu S.W. 3		Pts: Cáffaro, Lema 17; Rebs: Cáffaro 10; Asts: Faggiano 6

National Indoor Stadium
Referees: Julio Anaya (PAN), Petar Pešić (SRB), Alan dos Santos (BRA)

23 September
19:30

Boxscore

Beijing Royal Fighters (Chinese Basketball Association (organisation))	89–119	(USA Basketball) NBA G League United
Scoring by quarter: 20–33, 24–29, 21–30, 24–27
Pts: Cooke 30; Rebs: Giles 5 Asts: Riller 6		Pts: Grill 18; Rebs: Kelley 12; Asts: East 6

National Indoor Stadium
Referees: Takaki Kato (JPN), Ariadna Chueca (ESP), Ruben Woolcock (AUS)

24 September
19:30

Boxscore

Boca Juniors (Argentine Basketball Confederation)	74–79	(USA Basketball) NBA G League United
Scoring by quarter: 25–20, 18–16, 19–24, 12–19
Pts: Warren 15; Rebs: Helmanis, Cuello 7 Asts: Vildoza 7		Pts: Dixon 17; Rebs: Dixon 8 Asts: East 6

National Indoor Stadium
Referees: Julio Anaya (PAN), Julirys Guzman (PUR), Sun Jian (CHN)

== Final round ==
Semifinals
26 September
(Lithuanian Basketball Federation) Rytas	77
(Argentine Basketball Confederation) Boca Juniors	70
26 September
(USA Basketball) NBA G League United	114
(Rwanda Basketball Federation) RSSB Tigers	95

Final
27 September
(Lithuanian Basketball Federation) Rytas	86
(USA Basketball) NBA G League United	89
Third place game
27 September
(Argentine Basketball Confederation) Boca Juniors	93
(Rwanda Basketball Federation) RSSB Tigers	62

=== Fifth place game ===
26 September
12:00

Boxscore

Beijing Royal Fighters (Chinese Basketball Association (organisation))	101–87	(Chinese Basketball Association (organisation)) Shanghai Sharks
Scoring by quarter: 27–25, 25–18, 24–16, 25–28
Pts: Riller 22; Rebs: Giles, Shen 7 Asts: Zhu S.W, Shen 3		Pts: Cui X.L. 18; Rebs: Wang Z.L. 9 Asts: Yuan T.W. 6

National Indoor Stadium
Referees: Ruben Woolcock (AUS), Julirys Guzman (PUR), Arnold Moseya (RSA)

=== Semifinals ===
26 September
15:30

Boxscore

RSSB Tigers (Rwanda Basketball Federation)	95–114	(USA Basketball) NBA G League United
Scoring by quarter: 30–31, 23–25, 17–29, 25–29
Pts: Randall 25; Rebs: Lenard 7 Asts: Randall 7		Pts: Quiñones 29; Rebs: Ukomadu 8 Asts: East 7

National Indoor Stadium
Referees: Takaki Kato (JPN), Petar Pešić (SRB), Sun Jian (CHN)

26 September
19:30

Boxscore

Rytas (Lithuanian Basketball Federation)	77–70	(Argentine Basketball Confederation) Boca Juniors
Scoring by quarter: 11–16, 22–24, 17–18, 27–12
Pts: Devoe, Marčiulionis 14; Rebs: Masiulis 8 Asts: Devoe, Marčiulionis 4		Pts: Warren 16; Rebs: Cáffaro 8 Asts: Warren, Vildoza 3

National Indoor Stadium
Referees: Julio Anaya (PAN), Ariadna Chueca (ESP), Alan dos Santos (BRA)

=== Third place game ===
27 September
14:30

Boxscore

Boca Juniors (Argentine Basketball Confederation)	93–62	(Rwanda Basketball Federation) RSSB Tigers
Scoring by quarter: 26–18, 26–11, 23–16, 18–17
Pts: Monacci 15; Rebs: Lema 12; Asts: Barreiro 7		Pts: Bizimana, Jackson 10; Rebs: three players 5 Asts: Jackson 6

National Indoor Stadium
Referees: Petar Pešić (SRB), Ruben Woolcock(AUS), Arnold Moseya (RSA)

=== Final ===
27 September
18:30

Boxscore

Rytas (Lithuanian Basketball Federation)	86–89	(USA Basketball) NBA G League United
Scoring by quarter: 18–24, 28–18, 9–26, 31–21
Pts: Bruhnke, Jogėla 15; Rebs: Bruhnke 9 Asts: Marčiulionis 9		Pts: East 19; Rebs: Wheeler 8 Asts: East 3

National Indoor Stadium
Referees: Julio Anaya (PAN), Ariadna Chueca (ESP), Alan dos Santos (BRA)

== Final standings ==
Rank	Team	Record
1st place, gold medalist(s)	(USA Basketball) NBA G League United	4–0
2nd place, silver medalist(s)	(Lithuanian Basketball Federation) Rytas	3–1
3rd place, bronze medalist(s)	(Argentine Basketball Confederation) Boca Juniors	2–2
4	(Rwanda Basketball Federation) RSSB Tigers	1–3
5	(Chinese Basketball Association (organisation)) Beijing Royal Fighters	1–2
6	(Chinese Basketball Association (organisation)) Shanghai Sharks	0–3
