= Illinois Route 61 =

State highway in western Illinois, US

Illinois Route 61
- IL 61 highlighted in red

Route information
- Maintained by IDOT
- Length: 44.77 mi (72.05 km)
- Existed: 1924–present

Major junctions
- South end: IL 96 in Ursa
- North end: US 136 / IL 110 (CKC) / IL 336 in Tennessee

Location
- Country: United States
- State: Illinois
- Counties: Adams, Hancock, McDonough

Highway system
- Illinois State Highway System; Interstate; US; State; Tollways; Scenic
← IL 60	→ US 62

Illinois Route 61 (IL 61) is a rural state road in western Illinois that runs north and east from Illinois Route 96 in Ursa to the intersection of U.S. Route 136 2 miles (3.2 km) west of Tennessee. Illinois route 61 is 44.77 miles (72.05 km) long.

== Route description ==
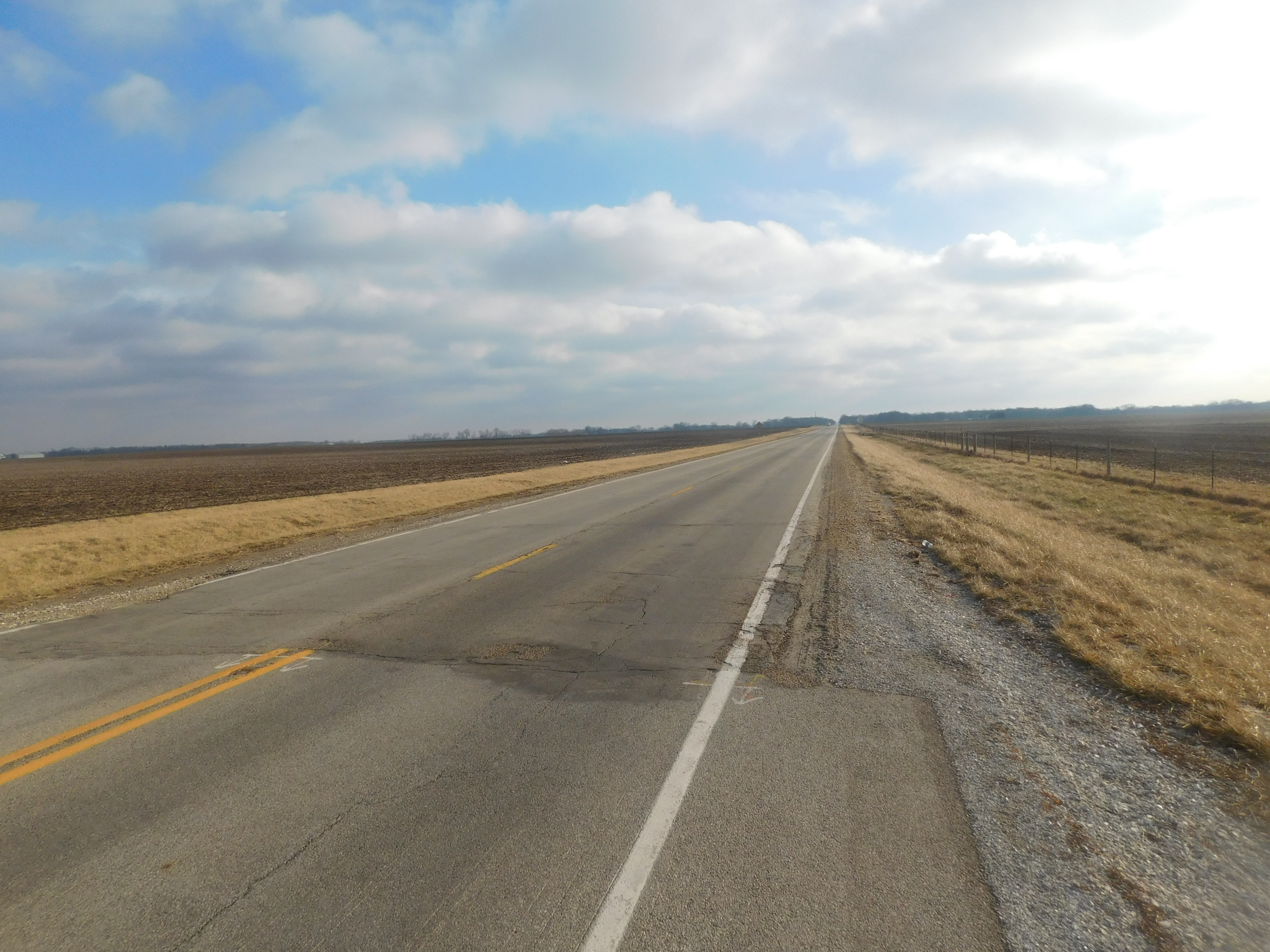
IL 61 heading south from US 136/IL 110/IL 336 in McDonough County

Illinois 61 starts in Ursa at the intersection of County Route 6, Illinois Route 96 (IL 96), and itself. After a short concurrency with IL 96, it travels northeast through farmland, passing Mendon. Shortly afterwards, it runs concurrently with the partially grade-separated Illinois Route 336 (IL 336) northwards. It splits off and east just south of Loraine, and travels north concurrent with Illinois Route 94 (IL 94), splitting off to the east afterwards in Bowen. It intersects Illinois Route 101 (IL 101) and heads north once again. Its northern terminus is at U.S. 136.

== History ==
SBI Route 61 was originally established in 1924 was the route between Richmond and Crystal Lake in northeastern Illinois. This route is now part of Illinois Route 31.

This route was established after 1937, when SBI Route 61 was removed from the Richmond to Crystal Lake route in northeastern Illinois. Since the route was established, it has served as the major route between Quincy, IL and Macomb, IL, bypassing Carthage, Illinois. The route crosses the LaMoine River south of Colmar and parallels the Quincy branch of the old Chicago, Burlington & Quincy railroad along sections of its route.

The route is currently designated as a Class II Truck Route.

== Major intersections ==
County	Location	mi	km	Destinations	Notes
Adams	Ursa	0.0	0.0	IL 96	Southern terminus of IL 61
Adams	Mendon	5.3	8.5	IL 110 (CKC) / IL 336	South end of IL 110/IL 336 overlap
Adams	Loraine	9.8	15.8	IL 110 (CKC) / IL 336	North end of IL 110/IL 336 overlap
Adams	Golden	18.3	29.5	IL 94	South end of IL 94 overlap
Hancock	Bowen	24.9	40.1	IL 94	North end of IL 94 overlap
Hancock	Augusta	31.0	49.9	IL 101	
McDonough	Tennessee	44.7	71.9	US 136 / IL 110 (CKC) / IL 336	Northern terminus of IL 61
1.000 mi = 1.609 km; 1.000 km = 0.621 mi: Concurrency terminus

== See also ==
- Illinois Route 336
