= NBA G League United =

- League: FIBA Intercontinental Cup
- Founded: 2024
- History: NBA G League United; 2024–present
- Arena: Kaiser Permanente Arena (Note: United does not have a permanent home base arena, but has hosted events at the in Santa Cruz, California.)
- Location: Santa Cruz, California
- Team colors: Black, Orange and Grey
- Head coach: Mahmoud Abdelfattah
- Ownership: NBA G League
- Championships: 1 FIBA Intercontinental Cup

The NBA G League United are an American basketball team composed of selected players of the NBA G League. The team represents the league in exhibition games and international tournaments, and was founded in 2024.

Previously, the G League had a league-owned team in the NBA G League Ignite, which represented it in international competitions, however, the team was dissolved. The team's first roster was announced in August 2024, and Paul Hewitt was the team's first head coach. They hosted an invitational tournament against Serbian team Mega Basket at Kaiser Permanente Arena in Santa Cruz, California in September 2024. United played in the 2024 FIBA Intercontinental Cup, the highest level club competition, as the United States representative. United became the first American team to reach the final in 50 years, following the Maryland Terrapins in 1974. They lost to Unicaja from Spain in the final and finished as runners-up.

== Honours ==
- FIBA Intercontinental Cup
  - Champions (1): 2026
  - Runners-up (2): 2024, 2025

== Current roster ==
The first roster was announced on August 27, 2024.

=== Current roster ===
Note: Flags indicate national team eligibility at FIBA-sanctioned events. Players may hold other non-FIBA nationalities not displayed.

NBA G League United roster
Players
Coaches

Pos.	No.	Nat.	Name	Ht.	Wt.	Age
G	1	(Japan)	Tominaga, Keisei	1.88 m (6 ft 2 in)	81 kg (179 lb)	25 – 1 February 2001
F	2	(United States)	Brown Jr., Charlie	1.98 m (6 ft 6 in)	90 kg (198 lb)	29 – 2 February 1997
SG	3	(United States)	Thomas, Brodric	1.96 m (6 ft 5 in)	84 kg (185 lb)	29 – 28 January 1997
SF	4	(United States)	Burton, Deonte	1.93 m (6 ft 4 in)	109 kg (240 lb)	32 – 31 January 1994
SF	5	(United States)	Bowden, Jordan	1.96 m (6 ft 5 in)	88 kg (194 lb)	29 – 20 January 1997
F	6	(Mexico)	Toscano-Anderson, Juan	1.98 m (6 ft 6 in)	95 kg (209 lb)	33 – 10 April 1993
F	7	(United States)	Baker, Robert	2.08 m (6 ft 10 in)	93 kg (205 lb)	28 – 28 June 1998
PG	8	(United States)	Wong, Isaiah	1.91 m (6 ft 3 in)	84 kg (185 lb)	25 – 28 January 2001
SF	10	(United States)	Moore, Tazé	1.96 m (6 ft 5 in)	88 kg (194 lb)	28 – 29 June 1998
PF	11	(United States)	Foster Jr., Michael	2.03 m (6 ft 8 in)	113 kg (249 lb)	23 – 16 January 2003
G	13	(United States)	Walker, M. J.	1.95 m (6 ft 5 in)	97 kg (214 lb)	28 – 28 March 1998

Head coach

- (United States) Paul Hewitt

Assistant coach(es)

- (United States) Taylor Hollowell
- (United States) John O'Connor
- (United States) Jeffery Trepagnier

Legend

- (C) Team captain
- Injured

- Roster
Updated: September 13, 2024

== Head coaches ==
- (United States) Paul Hewitt (2024)
- (United States) Joseph Blair (2025)
- (Palestine) (United States) Mahmoud Abdelfattah (2026)
