= Bowen, Illinois =

- Village
- Location of Bowen in Hancock County, Illinois.
- Coordinates: 40°13′55″N 91°03′48″W
- Country: United States
- State: Illinois
- County: Hancock

Area
  - Total: 0.43 sq mi (1.11 km^{2})
  - Land: 0.43 sq mi (1.11 km^{2})
  - Water: 0 sq mi (0.00 km^{2})
- Elevation: 686 ft (209 m)

Population (2020)
  - Total: 464
  - Density: 1,084.2/sq mi (418.62/km^{2})
- Time zone: UTC-6 (CST)
  - Summer (DST): UTC-5 (CDT)
- Zip code: 62316
- Area code: 217
- FIPS code: 17-07510
- GNIS feature ID: 2398155
- Website: https://www.villageofbowen.com/

Bowen (formerly Bowensburg) is a village in southeast Hancock County, Illinois, United States. The population was 464 at the 2020 census.

== Geography ==
Bowen is located in southeastern Hancock County. Illinois Route 61 passes through the center of town, entering from the east on 5th Street and leaving to the south on Worrell Street. Illinois Route 94 enters from the north on Worrell Street and leaves to the south with IL 61. To the north, IL 94 leads 16 miles (26 km) to Carthage, the county seat. IL 61 leads east 6 miles (10 km) to Augusta, and the two highways lead south six miles before splitting.

According to the 2021 census gazetteer files, Bowen has a total area of 0.43 square miles (1.11 km^{2}), all land.

== Demographics ==
Historical population
Census	Pop.	Note	%±
1880	289		—
1890	376		30.1%
1900	528		40.4%
1910	606		14.8%
1920	715		18.0%
1930	643		−10.1%
1940	619		−3.7%
1950	573		−7.4%
1960	559		−2.4%
1970	489		−12.5%
1980	525		7.4%
1990	462		−12.0%
2000	535		15.8%
2010	494		−7.7%
2020	464		−6.1%
U.S. Decennial Census

As of the 2020 census there were 464 people, 188 households, and 138 families residing in the village. The population density was 1,084.11 inhabitants per square mile (418.58/km^{2}). There were 195 housing units at an average density of 455.61 per square mile (175.91/km^{2}). The racial makeup of the village was 93.53% White, 0.43% African American, 0.22% Native American, 0.86% Asian, 0.00% Pacific Islander, 0.22% from other races, and 4.74% from two or more races. Hispanic or Latino of any race were 0.43% of the population.

There were 188 households, out of which 38.8% had children under the age of 18 living with them, 61.17% were married couples living together, 7.98% had a female householder with no husband present, and 26.60% were non-families. 21.28% of all households were made up of individuals, and 2.13% had someone living alone who was 65 years of age or older. The average household size was 3.64 and the average family size was 3.10.

The village's age distribution consisted of 32.4% under the age of 18, 6.3% from 18 to 24, 26.3% from 25 to 44, 23.4% from 45 to 64, and 11.5% who were 65 years of age or older. The median age was 33.6 years. For every 100 females, there were 103.1 males. For every 100 females age 18 and over, there were 108.5 males.

The median income for a household in the village was $58,929, and the median income for a family was $61,250. Males had a median income of $38,125 versus $21,111 for females. The per capita income for the village was $21,473. About 9.4% of families and 18.7% of the population were below the poverty line, including 18.5% of those under age 18 and 10.4% of those age 65 or over.
