= Littleton, Illinois =

Littleton
- Village
- Location of Littleton in Schuyler County, Illinois.
- Coordinates: 40°14′02″N 90°37′32″W
- Country: United States
- State: Illinois
- County: Schuyler

Area
  - Total: 1.17 sq mi (3.02 km^{2})
  - Land: 1.17 sq mi (3.02 km^{2})
  - Water: 0 sq mi (0.00 km^{2})
- Elevation: 682 ft (208 m)

Population (2020)
  - Total: 139
  - Density: 119.0/sq mi (45.95/km^{2})
- Time zone: UTC-6 (CST)
  - Summer (DST): UTC-5 (CDT)
- ZIP code: 61452
- Area code: 309
- FIPS code: 17-44056
- GNIS feature ID: 2398455

Littleton is a village in Schuyler County, Illinois, United States. The population was 139 at the 2020 census.

== History ==
James Little and his son-in-law William Window were the original promoters of the town. Window built the first house in 1847 and became the town's first postmaster that same year. On October 26, 1856 Littleton was hit by a destructive tornado, setting back development. Littleton's economy was largely agricultural based until the turn of the century. The town served as the southern terminus of the now defunct Macomb and Western Illinois Railway from 1904-1930.

Littleton was incorporated as a village in 1911.

== Geography ==
According to the 2010 census, Littleton has a total area of 1.17 square miles (3.03 km^{2}), all land.

== Demographics ==
Historical population
Census	Pop.	Note	%±
1920	300		—
1930	272		−9.3%
1940	277		1.8%
1950	215		−22.4%
1960	176		−18.1%
1970	208		18.2%
1980	168		−19.2%
1990	181		7.7%
2000	197		8.8%
2010	181		−8.1%
2020	139		−23.2%
U.S. Decennial Census

At the 2000 census, there were 197 people, 69 households and 50 families residing in the village. The population density was 169.3 per square mile (65.4/km^{2}). There were 76 housing units at an average density of 65.3 per square mile (25.2/km^{2}). The racial make up was 98.48% White, 1.02% African American, and 0.51% from two or more races. Hispanic or Latino of any race were 3.55% of the population.

There were 69 households, of which 39.1% had children under the age of 18 living with them, 65.2% were married couples living together, 4.3% had a female householder with no husband present, and 26.1% were non-families. 20.3% of all households were made up of individuals, and 8.7% had someone living alone who was 65 years of age or older. The average household size was 2.86 and the average family size was 3.29.

29.9% of the population were under the age of 18, 10.7% from 18 to 24, 30.5% from 25 to 44, 20.3% from 45 to 64, and 8.6% were 65 years of age or older. The median age was 33 years. For every 100 females, there were 93.1 males. For every 100 females age 18 and over, there were 109.1 males.

The median household income was $43,750 and the median family income was $47,875. Males had a median income of $24,792 and females $26,042. The per capita income was $14,670. None of the families and 0.5% of the population were living below the poverty line, including no under eighteens and 7.7% of those over 64.
