= 2022–23 Florida State Seminoles men's basketball team =

American college basketball season

2022–23 Florida State Seminoles men's basketball
- Conference: Atlantic Coast Conference
- Record: 9–23 (7–13 ACC)
- Head coach: Leonard Hamilton (21st season)
- Associate head coach: Stan Jones
- Assistant coaches: Steve Smith; R-Jay Barsh
- Home arena: Donald L. Tucker Center

2022–23 ACC men's basketball standings
	Conf.				Overall
Team	W		L	PCT	W		L	PCT
No. 16 Miami (FL)	15	–	5	.750	29	–	8	.784
No. 14 Virginia	15	–	5	.750	25	–	8	.758
Clemson	14	–	6	.700	23	–	11	.676
No. 12 Duke †	14	–	6	.700	27	–	9	.750
Pittsburgh	14	–	6	.700	24	–	12	.667
NC State	12	–	8	.600	23	–	11	.676
North Carolina	11	–	9	.550	20	–	13	.606
Wake Forest	10	–	10	.500	19	–	14	.576
Syracuse	10	–	10	.500	17	–	15	.531
Boston College	9	–	11	.450	16	–	17	.485
Virginia Tech	8	–	12	.400	19	–	15	.559
Florida State	7	–	13	.350	9	–	23	.281
Georgia Tech	6	–	14	.300	15	–	18	.455
Notre Dame	3	–	17	.150	11	–	21	.344
Louisville	2	–	18	.100	4	–	28	.125
† 2023 ACC tournament winner Rankings from AP poll

The 2022–23 Florida State Seminoles men's basketball team represented Florida State University during the 2022–23 NCAA Division I men's basketball season. The Seminoles were led by head coach Leonard Hamilton, in his 21st year, and played their home games at the Donald L. Tucker Center on the university's Tallahassee, Florida campus as members of the Atlantic Coast Conference. They finished the season 9–23, 7–13 in ACC play to finish in 12th place. In the ACC Tournament, they lost to Georgia Tech in the first round. Their nine overall wins were the lowest season total since 2001.

== Previous season ==
The Seminoles finished the 2021–22 season 17–14 overall and 10–10 in ACC play to finish in eight place. As the eighth seed in the ACC Tournament, they lost to Syracuse in their Second Round matchup. They were not invited to the NCAA Tournament or the NIT.

== Offseason ==
=== Departures ===
Florida State Departures
Name	Number	Pos.	Height	Weight	Year	Hometown	Reason for Departure
RayQuan Evans	0	G	6'4"	200	GS Senior	Billings, MT	Graduated
Anthony Polite	2	G	6'6"	214	GS Senior	Lugano, Switzerland	Graduated/undrafted in 2022 NBA draft
Malik Osborne	10	F	6'9"	225	GS Senior	Matteson, IL	Left the team for personal reasons
Tanor Ngom	11	C	7'2"	236	GS Senior	Dakar, Senegal	Graduated
Justin Linder	12	G	6'1"	180	GS Senior	Memphis, TN	Walk-on; graduated
Quincy Ballard	15	C	7'0"	240	Sophomore	Syracuse, NY	Transferred to Wichita State
John Butler Jr.	22	F	7'1"	190	Freshman	Greenville, SC	Declare for 2022 NBA draft; went undrafted
John Horner	25	F	6'7"	205	Freshman	Ventor City, NJ	Walk-on; left the team for personal reasons
Harrison Prieto	30	F	6'8"	230	GS Senior	Mandeville, LA	Walk-on; graduated
Wyatt Wilkes	31	G	6'8"	220	(redshirt) Senior	Orlando, FL	Left the team for personal reasons
Barrett Waldrop	34	G/F	6'7"	205	Freshman	Freeport, FL	

=== Incoming transfers ===
Florida State incoming transfers
Name	Number	Pos.	Height	Weight	Year	Hometown	Previous School
Darin Green Jr.	22	G	6'5"	190	Senior	Charlotte, NC	UCF
Jaylan Gainey	33	F	6'9"	220	GS Senior	Greensboro, NC	Brown

=== 2022 recruiting class ===
College recruiting information
Name	Hometown	School	Height	Weight	Commit date
Baba Miller; SF	Spain	Real Madrid	6 ft 10 in (2.08 m)	180 lb (82 kg)	Jun 6, 2022
Baba Miller; SF	Recruit ratings: Rivals: 247Sports: ESPN: (88)				
De'Ante Green #18 PF	Asheville, NC	Christ School	6 ft 9 in (2.06 m)	210 lb (95 kg)	Oct 5, 2021
De'Ante Green #18 PF	Recruit ratings: Rivals: 247Sports: ESPN: (84)				
Cameron Corhen #14 C	Plano, TX	Sunrise Christian Academy	6 ft 9 in (2.06 m)	205 lb (93 kg)	Sep 12, 2021
Cameron Corhen #14 C	Recruit ratings: Rivals: 247Sports: ESPN: (83)				
Chandler Jackson #48 SG	Memphis, TN	Christian Brothers High School	6 ft 2 in (1.88 m)	205 lb (93 kg)	Oct 29, 2021
Chandler Jackson #48 SG	Recruit ratings: Rivals: 247Sports: ESPN: (80)				
Tom House #44 SF	Dayton, OH	Centerville High School	6 ft 6 in (1.98 m)	200 lb (91 kg)	Sep 29, 2021
Tom House #44 SF	Recruit ratings: Rivals: 247Sports: ESPN: (79)				
Jeremiah Bembry #73 SG	Allentown, PA	Executive Education Academy	6 ft 6 in (1.98 m)	175 lb (79 kg)	Oct 25, 2021
Jeremiah Bembry #73 SG	Recruit ratings: Rivals: 247Sports: ESPN: (70)				
Overall recruit ranking: Rivals: 6 247Sports: 5
Note: In many cases, Scout, Rivals, 247Sports, On3, and ESPN may conflict in their listings of height and weight.; In these cases, the average was taken. ESPN grades are on a 100-point scale.; Sources: "Florida State Seminoles". ESPN.; "2022 Team Ranking". Rivals.

=== 2023 Recruiting class ===
College recruiting information (2023)
Name	Hometown	School	Height	Weight	Commit date
Taylor Bol Bowen #12 PF	Wolfeboro, NH	Brewster Academy	6 ft 8 in (2.03 m)	195 lb (88 kg)	Jun 25, 2022
Taylor Bol Bowen #12 PF	Recruit ratings: Rivals: 247Sports: ESPN: (87)				
Overall recruit ranking: Rivals: 6 247Sports: 5
Note: In many cases, Scout, Rivals, 247Sports, On3, and ESPN may conflict in their listings of height and weight.; In these cases, the average was taken. ESPN grades are on a 100-point scale.; Sources: "Florida State Seminoles". ESPN.; "2023 Team Ranking". Rivals.

== Roster ==
2022–23 Florida State Seminoles men's basketball team
Players
Coaches

Pos.	#	Name	Height	Weight	Year	Previous school	Hometown
G	0	Chandler Jackson	6 ft 5 in (1.96 m)	215 lb (98 kg)	Fr	Christian Brothers	Memphis, TN
G	1	Jalen Warley	6 ft 6 in (1.98 m)	200 lb (91 kg)	So	Westtown School	Mount Airy, PA
F	3	Cameron Corhen	6 ft 10 in (2.08 m)	225 lb (102 kg)	Fr	Sunrise Christian Academy	Allen, TX
G	4	Caleb Mills	6 ft 5 in (1.96 m)	180 lb (82 kg)	RS Jr	T. C. Roberson; Houston	Arden, NC
F	5	De'Ante Green	6 ft 10 in (2.08 m)	210 lb (95 kg)	Fr	Asheville Christian	Asheville, NC
F	10	Jeremiah Bembry	6 ft 6 in (1.98 m)	185 lb (84 kg)	Fr	Executive Education Academy	Brooklyn, NY
F	11	Baba Miller	6 ft 11 in (2.11 m)	204 lb (93 kg)	Fr	Real Madrid	Mallorca, Spain
F	12	Tom House	6 ft 7 in (2.01 m)	200 lb (91 kg)	Fr	Centerville	Dayton, OH
G	21	Cam'Ron Fletcher	6 ft 7 in (2.01 m)	215 lb (98 kg)	Jr	Vashon; Kentucky	St. Louis, MO
G	22	Darin Green Jr.	6 ft 5 in (1.96 m)	195 lb (88 kg)	Jr	Wharton; UCF	Charlotte, NC
C	24	Naheem McLeod	7 ft 4 in (2.24 m)	255 lb (116 kg)	Jr	Plymouth-Whitemarsh; Chipola College	Philadelphia, PA
F	33	Jaylan Gainey	6 ft 10 in (2.08 m)	220 lb (100 kg)	GS	The Academy at Smith; Brown	Greensboro, NC
G	35	Matthew Cleveland	6 ft 7 in (2.01 m)	200 lb (91 kg)	So	Pace Academy	Atlanta, GA
G	40	Isaac Spainhour (W)	6 ft 3 in (1.91 m)	180 lb (82 kg)	RS So	West Stokes	King, NC
G	41	R.J. Morris (W)	6 ft 3 in (1.91 m)	185 lb (84 kg)	Fr	Jupiter Christian	Jupiter, FL
G	42	Cleveland Yates (W)	6 ft 2 in (1.88 m)	214 lb (97 kg)	RS So	Briarcrest Christian School	Memphis, TN
G	44	Max Thorpe (W)	6 ft 3 in (1.91 m)	175 lb (79 kg)	RS Fr	Countryside	Clearwater, FL
F	45	Michael Brown (W)	6 ft 7 in (2.01 m)	220 lb (100 kg)	So	Sidwell Friends	Fort Washington, MD

Head coach

- Leonard Hamilton (UT Martin)

Assistant coach(es)

- Stan Jones (Memphis)
- Steve Smith (Morgan State)
- R-Jay Barsh (Puget Sound)

Legend

- (C) Team captain
- (S) Suspended
- (I) Ineligible
- (W) Walk-on
- Injured
- Current redshirt

Roster

== Schedule and results ==
Date time, TV	Rank^{#}	Opponent^{#}	Result	Record	High points	High rebounds	High assists	Site (attendance) city, state Source:
Exhibition
October 27, 2022*; 7:00 p.m.		Newberry College	W 74–66	–	15 – Green Jr.	10 – Fletcher	9 – Mills	Donald L. Tucker Civic Center; Tallahassee, FL
Regular season
November 7, 2022*; 7:00 p.m., ACCRSN		Stetson	L 74–83	0–1	16 – Cleveland	9 – Fletcher	4 – Tied	Donald L. Tucker Civic Center (6,729); Tallahassee, FL
November 11, 2022*; 7:00 p.m., ESPN+		at UCF	L 54–68	0–2	17 – Green, Jr.	6 – Fletcher	5 – Warley	Addition Financial Arena (6,485); Orlando, FL
November 14, 2022*; 8:00 p.m., ACCN		Troy	L 72–79	0–3	24 – Green, Jr.	10 – Fletcher	4 – Tied	Donald L. Tucker Civic Center (4,973); Tallahassee, FL
November 18, 2022*; 8:00 p.m., ACCN		Florida; Rivalry	L 67–76	0–4	21 – Mills	8 – Fletcher	2 – Tied	Donald L. Tucker Civic Center (9,182); Tallahassee, FL
November 21, 2022*; 6:30 p.m., ACCN		Mercer	W 81–72	1–4	23 – Fletcher	9 – McLeod	5 – Green, Jr.	Donald L. Tucker Civic Center (4,454); Tallahassee, FL
November 24, 2022*; 11:00 a.m., ESPN2		vs. Siena; ESPN Events Invitational Quarterfinals	L 63–80	1–5	14 – Cleveland	6 – Tied	4 – Tied	State Farm Field House; Bay Lake, FL
November 25, 2022*; 1:30 p.m., ESPNews		vs. Stanford; ESPN Events Invitational Consolation Game	L 60–70	1–6	16 – Mills	5 – Tied	4 – Mills	State Farm Field House (1,108); Bay Lake, FL
November 27, 2022*; 7:30 p.m., ESPNews		vs. Nebraska; ESPN Events Invitational 7th Place Game	L 58–75	1–7	17 – Cleveland	8 – Fletcher	6 – Mills	State Farm Field House (1,087); Bay Lake, FL
November 30, 2022*; 7:15 p.m., ESPN2		No. 5 Purdue; ACC–Big Ten Challenge	L 69–79	1–8	23 – Green, Jr.	10 – Fletcher	6 – Warley	Donald L. Tucker Civic Center (5,852); Tallahassee, FL
December 3, 2022; 2:00 p.m., ESPN2		at No. 3 Virginia	L 57–62	1–9 (0–1)	17 – Green, Jr.	10 – Cleveland	4 – Mills	John Paul Jones Arena (14,280); Charlottesville, VA
December 10, 2022; 1:00 p.m., ACCN		Louisville	W 75–53	2–9 (1–1)	16 – Mills	8 – Cleveland	4 – Tied	Donald L. Tucker Civic Center (5,718); Tallahassee, FL
December 13, 2022*; 8:30 p.m., ACCN		USC Upstate	W 80–63	3–9	16 – Cleveland	10 – Cleveland	5 – Mills	Donald L. Tucker Civic Center (4,741); Tallahassee, FL
December 17, 2022*; 2:30 p.m., BSFL		vs. St. John's; Orange Bowl Basketball Classic	L 79–93	3–10	30 – Green, Jr.	13 – Cleveland	8 – Mills	FLA Live Arena (6,987); Sunrise, FL
December 21, 2022; 8:30 p.m., ACCN		Notre Dame	W 73–72	4–10 (2–1)	19 – Cleveland	12 – Cleveland	5 – Warley	Donald L. Tucker Civic Center (6,394); Tallahassee, FL
December 31, 2022; 1:00 p.m., ESPN2		at No. 17 Duke	L 67–86	4–11 (2–2)	18 – Tied	10 – Cleveland	3 – Tied	Cameron Indoor Stadium (9,314); Durham, NC
January 7, 2023; 1:00 p.m., ACCRSN		Georgia Tech	W 75–64	5–11 (3–2)	21 – Cleveland	12 – Cleveland	7 – Mills	Donald L. Tucker Civic Center (5,536); Tallahassee, FL
January 11, 2023; 9:00 p.m., ACCN		at Wake Forest	L 75–90	5–12 (3–3)	19 – Tied	12 – Cleveland	7 – Worley	LJVM Coliseum (8,174); Winston-Salem, NC
January 14, 2023; 4:00 p.m., ESPN2		No. 13 Virginia	L 58–67	5–13 (3–4)	15 – Corhen	10 – Cleveland	4 – Tied	Donald L. Tucker Civic Center (9,043); Tallahassee, FL
January 17, 2023; 7:00 p.m., ESPNU		at Notre Dame	W 84–71	6–13 (4–4)	20 – Green, Jr.	16 – Cleveland	5 – Cleveland	Joyce Center (6,216); South Bend, IN
January 21, 2023; 3:00 p.m., ACCN		at Pittsburgh	W 71–64	7–13 (5–4)	24 – Green, Jr.	7 – Tied	4 – Tied	Peterson Events Center (10,390); Pittsburgh, PA
January 24, 2023; 7:00 p.m., ESPNU		No. 20 Miami (FL)	L 63–86	7–14 (5–5)	12 – Mills	5 – Tied	5 – Warley	Donald L. Tucker Civic Center (9,182); Tallahassee, FL
January 28, 2023; 5:00 p.m., ACCN		No. 24 Clemson	L 81–82	7–15 (5–6)	18 – Cleveland	4 – Tied	5 – Green, Jr.	Donald L. Tucker Civic Center (7,956); Tallahassee, FL
February 1, 2023; 9:00 p.m., ACCN		at NC State	L 66–94	7–16 (5–7)	16 – Corhen	6 – Corhen	6 – Mills	PNC Arena (12,206); Raleigh, NC
February 4, 2023; 2:00 p.m., ESPN2		at Louisville	W 81–78	8–16 (6–7)	16 – Corhen	10 – Cleveland	5 – Tied	KFC Yum! Center (12,966); Louisville, KY
February 8, 2023; 7:00 p.m., ESPNU		Syracuse	L 67–76	8–17 (6–8)	19 – Cleveland	12 – Cleveland	9 – Jackson	Donald L. Tucker Civic Center (5,656); Tallahassee, FL
February 11, 2023; 12:00 p.m., ESPNU		Pittsburgh	L 75–83	8–18 (6–9)	23 – Warley	6 – Tied	3 – Mills	Donald L. Tucker Civic Center (5,845); Tallahassee, FL
February 15, 2023; 7:00 p.m., ACCRSN		at Clemson	L 54–94	8–19 (6–10)	12 – Miller	6 – Miller	3 – Tied	Littlejohn Coliseum (6,458); Clemson, SC
February 18, 2023; 12:00 p.m., ACCRSN		at Boston College	L 69–75	8–20 (6–11)	27 – Mills	7 – Mills	2 – Tied	Donald L. Tucker Civic Center (6,025); Tallahassee, FL
February 25, 2023; 4:00 p.m., ESPN2		at No. 13 Miami (FL)	W 85–84	9–20 (7–11)	20 – Tied	7 – Warley	5 – Tied	Watsco Center (7,972); Coral Gables, FL
February 27, 2023; 7:00 p.m., ESPN		North Carolina; Big Monday	L 66–77	9–21 (7–12)	19 – Mills	9 – Cleveland	3 – Mills	Donald L. Tucker Civic Center (7,791); Tallahassee, FL
March 4, 2023; 4:00 p.m., ESPN2		at Virginia Tech	L 60–82	9–22 (7–13)	14 – Mills	4 – Tied	3 – Green Jr.	Cassell Coliseum (8,925); Blacksburg, VA
ACC Tournament
March 7, 2023; 2:00 p.m., ACCN	(12)	vs. (13) Georgia Tech; First round	L 60–61	9–23	12 – Tied	12 – Corhen	4 – Tied	Greensboro Coliseum (7,231); Greensboro, NC
*Non-conference game. ^{#}Rankings from AP Poll. (#) Tournament seedings in parentheses. All times are in Eastern Time.

== Rankings ==
Ranking movements Legend: ██ Increase in ranking ██ Decrease in ranking — = Not ranked RV = Received votes
	Week																			
Poll	Pre	1	2	3	4	5	6	7	8	9	10	11	12	13	14	15	16	17	18	Final
AP	RV	—	—	—	—	—	—	—	—	—	—	—	—	—	—	—	—	—	—	Not released
Coaches	RV	—	—	—	—	—	—	—	—	—	—	—	—	—	—	—	—	—	—	—

== Awards ==
Honors
Player	Award	Ref.
Cam Corhen	ACC Rookie of the Week (Week Seven)	
Matthew Cleveland	Julius Erving Award finalist	
