= 2022–23 Atlantic Coast Conference men's basketball season =

- League: NCAA Division I
- Sport: Basketball
- Duration: November 7, 2022 – March 4, 2023
- Teams: 15
- TV partner(s): ACC Network, ESPN, ACC RSN

NBA Draft
- Top draft pick: Dereck Lively II, Duke
- Picked by: Oklahoma City, 12th overall

2022–23 NCAA Division I men's basketball season
- First place (tie): Miami (FL); Virginia
- Season MVP: Isaiah Wong, Miami
- Top scorer: Tyree Appleby, 18.8 ppg - Wake Forest

ACC tournament
- Champions: Duke
- Finals MVP: Kyle Filipowski – Duke

Atlantic Coast Conference men's basketball seasons
- ← 2021–22 2023–24 →

2022–23 ACC men's basketball standings
	Conf.				Overall
Team	W		L	PCT	W		L	PCT
No. 16 Miami (FL)	15	–	5	.750	29	–	8	.784
No. 14 Virginia	15	–	5	.750	25	–	8	.758
Clemson	14	–	6	.700	23	–	11	.676
No. 12 Duke †	14	–	6	.700	27	–	9	.750
Pittsburgh	14	–	6	.700	24	–	12	.667
NC State	12	–	8	.600	23	–	11	.676
North Carolina	11	–	9	.550	20	–	13	.606
Wake Forest	10	–	10	.500	19	–	14	.576
Syracuse	10	–	10	.500	17	–	15	.531
Boston College	9	–	11	.450	16	–	17	.485
Virginia Tech	8	–	12	.400	19	–	15	.559
Florida State	7	–	13	.350	9	–	23	.281
Georgia Tech	6	–	14	.300	15	–	18	.455
Notre Dame	3	–	17	.150	11	–	21	.344
Louisville	2	–	18	.100	4	–	28	.125
† 2023 ACC tournament winner Rankings from AP poll

The 2022–23 Atlantic Coast Conference men's basketball season began with practices in October 2022, followed by the start of the 2022–23 NCAA Division I men's basketball season in November. Conference play began in December 2022 and concluded March 7–11, 2023, with the 2023 ACC men's basketball tournament at the Greensboro Coliseum in Greensboro, North Carolina. This was the 69th season of Atlantic Coast Conference basketball.

== Head coaches ==
=== Coaching changes ===
- Mike Krzyzewski announced his retirement prior to the 2021–22 season, which he stated would be his final season. Kryzewski was head coach of Duke for forty-two years. After the season concluded, Jon Scheyer became the new head coach at Duke.
- Chris Mack was fired as head coach of Louisville on January 26, 2022. In March of 2022 it was announced that Kenny Payne had been hired as the new head coach.

=== Coaches ===
Team	Head coach	Previous job	Years at school	Record at school	ACC record	ACC titles	NCAA tournaments	NCAA Final Fours	NCAA Championships
Boston College	Earl Grant	Charleston	2	13–20	6–14	0	0	0	0
Clemson	Brad Brownell	Wright State	13	218–166	103–111	0	3	0	0
Duke	Jon Scheyer	Duke (Associate Head Coach)	1	0–0	0–0	0	0	0	0
Florida State	Leonard Hamilton	Washington Wizards	21	417–242	186–156	1	11	0	0
Georgia Tech	Josh Pastner	Memphis	7	94–96	47–64	1	1	0	0
Louisville	Kenny Payne	New York Knicks (Assistant)	1	0–0	0–0	0	0	0	0
Miami	Jim Larrañaga	George Mason	12	226–141	106–96	1	5	1	0
NC State	Kevin Keatts	UNC Wilmington	6	90–68	43–50	0	1	0	0
North Carolina	Hubert Davis	North Carolina (Assistant)	2	29–10	15–5	0	1	1	0
Notre Dame	Mike Brey	Delaware	23	472–259	222–164	1	13	0	0
Pittsburgh	Jeff Capel	Duke (Assistant)	5	51–69	21–53	0	0	0	0
Syracuse	Jim Boeheim	Syracuse (Assistant)	46	998–426	421–265	0	32	5	1
Virginia	Tony Bennett	Washington State	14	316–117	162–70	2	8	1	1
Virginia Tech	Mike Young	Wofford	4	54–36	11–9	1	2	0	0
Wake Forest	Steve Forbes	East Tennessee State	3	31–26	16–22	0	0	0	0

Notes:

- Year at school includes 2022–23 season.
- Overall and ACC records are from the time at current school and are through the end of the 2021–22 season.
- NCAA tournament appearances are from the time at current school only.
- NCAA Final Fours and championship include time at other schools.

== Preseason ==
=== Recruiting classes ===
Rankings
Team	247 Sports	Rivals	Commits
Boston College	33	30	4
Clemson	32	45	4
Duke	1	1	7
Florida State	14	27	6
Georgia Tech	133	NR	2
Louisville	26	36	3
Miami	23	24	4
NC State	95	NR	1
North Carolina	17	21	3
Notre Dame	22	20	3
Pittsburgh	74	35	4
Syracuse	19	8	6
Virginia	13	17	4
Virginia Tech	28	28	4
Wake Forest	56	69	2

Notes:

- Rankings are up to date as of October 18, 2022.
- NR stands for not ranked.

=== Preseason watchlists ===
Naismith	Cousy	West	Erving	Malone	Abdul-Jabbar
Dereck Lively II – Duke; Jeremy Roach – Duke; Dariq Whitehead – Duke; Nijel Pack – Miami; Isaiah Wong – Miami; Armando Bacot – North Carolina; R. J. Davis – North Carolina; Caleb Love – North Carolina; Terquavion Smith – NC State	Jeremy Roach – Duke; Caleb Love – North Carolina; Kihei Clark – Virginia	Tyrese Proctor – Duke; Isaiah Wong – Miami; Terquavion Smith – NC State; Dane Goodwin – Notre Dame; Joseph Girard III – Syracuse	Dariq Whitehead – Duke; Matthew Cleveland – Florida State; Leaky Black – North Carolina	Kyle Filipowski – Duke; Norchad Omier – Miami; Pete Nance – North Carolina; Justyn Mutts – Virginia Tech	PJ Hall – Clemson; Dereck Lively II – Duke; Armando Bacot – North Carolina

=== Preseason polls ===
	247 Sports	AP	Blue Ribbon; Yearbook	CBS Sports	Coaches	ESPN	KenPom	NCAA Sports	Sports; Illustrated
Boston College							74		
Clemson							60		
Duke	8	7	5	5	8	5	15	9	9
Florida State	23	RV			RV		65	RV	
Georgia Tech							117		
Louisville							91		
Miami		RV			RV	RV	42	17	
North Carolina	2	1	1	2	1	1	9	1	1
NC State							81		
Notre Dame		RV					43	RV	
Pittsburgh							84		
Syracuse					RV		54		
Virginia	25	18	20	16	18	18	5	29	
Virginia Tech		RV			RV		21		
Wake Forest							80		

==== ACC Preseason Media poll ====
The preseason poll and preseason all-ACC teams were released on October 18, 2022.

===== Preseason poll =====
1. North Carolina – 1,504 (90)
2. Duke – 1,339 (2)
3. Virginia – 1,310 (6)
4. Miami – 1,138 (2)
5. Florida State – 1,064
6. Notre Dame – 971
7. Virginia Tech – 921 (1)
8. Syracuse – 800
9. Wake Forest – 672
10. NC State – 548
11. Clemson – 528
12. Louisville – 477
13. Boston College – 368
14. Pittsburgh – 320
15. Georgia Tech – 260

First-place votes shown in parentheses

===== Preseason All-ACC teams =====
2021 ACC Men's Basketball Preseason All-ACC Teams
First Team	Second Team
Armando Bacot – North Carolina; Isaiah Wong – Miami; Caleb Love – North Carolina; Terquavion Smith – NC State; Jeremy Roach – Duke	Jayden Gardner – Virginia; Dereck Lively II – Duke; Justyn Mutts – Virginia Tech; PJ Hall – Clemson; R. J. Davis – North Carolina

===== ACC preseason player of the year =====
- Armando Bacot – North Carolina (82)
- Isaiah Wong – Miami (5)
- Caleb Love – North Carolina (4)
- Jeremy Roach – Duke (3)
- PJ Hall – Clemson (2)
- R. J. Davis – North Carolina (2)
- Terquavion Smith – NC State (1)
- Hunter Cattoor – Virginia Tech (1)
- Dariq Whitehead – Duke (1)

===== ACC preseason freshman of the year =====
- Dereck Lively II – Duke (57)
- Dariq Whitehead – Duke (25)
- Tyrese Proctor – Duke (5)
- Mark Mitchell – Duke (3)
- Tyler Nickel – North Carolina (2)
- Jalen Washington – North Carolina (2)
- JJ Starling – Notre Dame (2)
- Kyle Filipowski – Duke (2)
- Prince Aligbe – Boston College (1)
- Isaac McKneely – Virginia (1)
- Seth Trimble – North Carolina (1)

=== Early-season tournaments ===
Team	Tournament	Finish
Boston College	Paradise Jam	3rd
Clemson	Emerald Coast Classic	3rd
Duke	Phil Knight Legacy	2nd
Florida State	ESPN Events Invitational	8th
Georgia Tech	Fort Myers Tip-Off	4th
Louisville	Maui Invitational	8th
Miami	Hall of Fame Tip-Off	2nd
North Carolina	Phil Knight Invitational	4th
NC State	Battle 4 Atlantis	5th
Notre Dame	Gotham Classic	2–1
Pittsburgh	Legends Classic	4th
Syracuse	Empire Classic	2nd
Virginia	Roman Main Event	1st
Virginia Tech	Charleston Classic	2nd
Wake Forest	Jamaica Classic	2nd

== Regular season ==
=== Rankings ===
Legend
Increase in ranking
Decrease in ranking
Not ranked previous week
First-place votes shown in ()

		Pre	Wk 2	Wk 3	Wk 4	Wk 5	Wk 6	Wk 7	Wk 8	Wk 9	Wk 10	Wk 11	Wk 12	Wk 13	Wk 14	Wk 15	Wk 16	Wk 17	Wk 18	Wk 19	Final
Boston College	AP																				N/A
Boston College	C																				
Clemson	AP										RV	19	24	20	RV			RV			N/A
Clemson	C										RV	19	23	19	24т	RV		RV			
Duke	AP	7	7	8	17	15	12	14	17	16	24	RV	RV	RV	RV		RV	RV	21	12	N/A
Duke	C	8	8	10	16	15	12	14	14	14	21	RV	25	RV	24т	RV	RV	RV	21	16	18
Florida State	AP	RV																			N/A
Florida State	C	RV																			
Georgia Tech	AP																				N/A
Georgia Tech	C																				
Louisville	AP																				N/A
Louisville	C																				
Miami	AP	RV	RV	RV	RV	RV	25	22	14	12	16	17	20	23	19	15	13	16	14	16	N/A
Miami	C	RV	RV	RV	RV	RV	25	22	16	12	15	16	19	21	20	13	11	15	13	15	3
North Carolina	AP	1 (47)	1 (44)	1 (47)	18	RV		RV	25		RV	RV	RV	RV							N/A
North Carolina	C	1 (23)	1 (22)	1 (23)	15	RV	RV	RV	RV		RV	RV	RV	RV							
NC State	AP										RV	RV	RV	RV	22	23	RV	RV			N/A
NC State	C											RV	RV	RV	22	22	24	RV	RV	RV	
Notre Dame	AP	RV																			N/A
Notre Dame	C																				
Pittsburgh	AP										RV			RV	RV	RV	RV	25	RV		N/A
Pittsburgh	C										RV			RV	RV	RV	RV	25	RV	RV	RV
Syracuse	AP																				N/A
Syracuse	C	RV																			
Virginia	AP	18	16	5 (1)	3 (2)	3 (3)	2 (19)	6	13	11	13	10	7	6	8	7	6	13	13	14	N/A
Virginia	C	18	14	6	3 (1)	3	2 (12)	6	12	11	12	10	6	4	9	6 (1)	6 (1)	12	11	10	23
Virginia Tech	AP	RV	RV	RV	RV	RV	24	21	RV	RV											N/A
Virginia Tech	C	RV	RV	RV		RV	23т	20	RV	RV									RV		
Wake Forest	AP												RV								N/A
Wake Forest	C												RV								

=== Conference matrix ===
This table summarizes the head-to-head results between teams in conference play. Each team played 20 conference games, including at least 1 against each opponent.

	Boston College	Clemson	Duke	Florida State	Georgia Tech	Louisville	Miami	North Carolina	NC State	Notre Dame	Pittsburgh	Syracuse	Virginia	Virginia Tech	Wake Forest
vs. Boston College	–	54–62	75–59; 65–64	69–75	73–65	65–75	88–72	72–64	92–62	63–70; 72–84	77–58	79–65; 77–68	76–57; 48–63	65–70 (OT); 76–82	85–63; 69–71
vs. Clemson	62–54	–	64–72	81–82; 54–94	66–79; 51–72	70–83; 83–73	78–74	91–71	64–78; 71–96	64–87	74–75	73–91	64–57	65–68; 50–51	57–77; 87–77
vs. Duke	59–75; 64–65	72–64	–	67–86	43–86	62–79	66–68; 81–59	57–63; 57–62	84–60; 67–71	64–68	69–77	55–77	69–62 (OT)	78–75; 65–81	81–70; 73–75
vs. Florida State	75–69	82–81; 94–54	86–67	–	64–75	53–75; 78–81	86–63; 84–85	77–66	94–66	72–73; 71–84	64–71; 83–75	76–67	62–57; 67–58	82–60	90–75
vs. Georgia Tech	65–73	79–66; 72–51	86–43	75–64	–	68–58; 67–83	70–76	75–59	78–66; 72–64	73–72 (OT); 68–70	71–60; 76–68	80–63; 76–96	74–56	70–77	71–70
vs. Louisville	75–65	83–70; 73–83	79–62	75–53; 81–78	58–68; 83–67	–	80–53; 93–85	80–59	76–64	76–62	75–54; 91–57	70–69	61–58; 60–75	71–54	80–72
vs. Miami	72–88	74–78	68–66; 59–81	63–86; 85–84	76–70	53–80; 85–93	–	72–80	73–80; 83–81 (OT)	65–76	71–68; 76–78	78–82	64–66	83–92; 70–76	87–96
vs. North Carolina	64–72	71–91	63–57; 62–57	66–77	59–75	59–80	80–72	–	69–80; 77–69	64–81; 59–63	76–74; 65–64	68–72	65–58; 63–71	80–72	79–88; 92–85
vs. NC State	62–92	78–64; 96–71	60–84; 71–67	66–94	66–78; 64–72	64–67	80–73; 81–83 (OT)	80–69; 69–77	–	82–85	68–60	75–72	63–50	69–73	77–79; 74–90
vs. Notre Dame	70–63; 84–72	87–64	68–64	73–72; 84–71	72–73 (OT); 70–68	62–76	76–65	81–64; 63–59	85–82	–	81–88	62–61; 78–73	57–55	93–87	81–64; 66–58
vs. Pittsburgh	58–77	75–74	77–69	71–64; 75–83	60–71; 68–76	54–75; 57–91	68–71; 78–76	74–76; 64–65	60–68	88–81	–	82–84; 82–99	65–68	79–72	79–81
vs. Syracuse	65–79; 68–77	91–73	77–55	67–76	63–80; 96–76	69–70	82–78	72–68	72–75	61–62; 73–78	84–82; 99–82	–	73–66; 67–62	72–82; 85–70	63–72
vs. Virginia	57–76; 63–48	57–64	62–69 (OT)	57–62; 58–67	56–74	58–61; 75–60	66–64	58–65; 71–63	50–63	55–57	68–65	66–73; 62–67	–	68–78; 74–68	67–76
vs. Virginia Tech	70–65 (OT); 82–76	68–65; 51–50	75–78; 81–65	60–82	77–70	54–71	92–83; 76–70	72–80	73–69	87–93	72–79	82–72; 70–85	78–68; 68–74	–	77–75
vs. Wake Forest	63–85; 71–69	77–57; 77–87	70–81; 75–73	75–90	70–71	72–80	96–87	88–79; 85–92	79–77; 90–74	64–81; 58–66	81–79	72–63	76–67	75–77	–
Total	9–11	14–6	14–6	7–13	6–14	2–18	15–5	11–9	12–8	3–17	14–6	10–10	15–5	8–12	10–10

=== Player of the week ===
Throughout the conference regular season, the Atlantic Coast Conference offices named one or two players of the week and one or two rookies of the week.

Week	Player of the week	Rookie of the week	Reference
Week 1 – Nov 14	Nate Laszewski – Notre Dame	Kyle Filipowski – Duke	
Week 2 – Nov 21	Reece Beekman – Virginia	Kyle Filipowski (2) – Duke	
Week 3 – Nov 28	Jarkel Joiner – NC State	Kyle Filipowski (3) – Duke	
Week 4 – Dec 5	Justyn Mutts – Virginia Tech	Kyle Filipowski (4) – Duke	
Week 5 – Dec 12	Isaiah Wong – Miami	Judah Mintz – Syracuse	
Week 6 – Dec 19	Armando Bacot – North Carolina	Judah Mintz (2) – Syracuse	
Week 7 – Dec 27	Isaiah Wong (2) – Miami	Cam Corhen – Florida State	
Week 7 – Dec 27	Blake Hinson – Pittsburgh	Cam Corhen – Florida State	
Week 8 – Jan 2	Hunter Tyson – Clemson	Judah Mintz (3) – Syracuse	
Week 8 – Jan 2	Jamarius Burton – Pittsburgh	Judah Mintz (3) – Syracuse	
Week 9 – Jan 9	Armando Bacot (2) – North Carolina	Mike James – Louisville	
Week 10 – Jan 16	Andrew Carr – Wake Forest	Kyle Filipowski (5) – Duke	
Week 11 – Jan 23	Armando Bacot (3) – North Carolina	Kyle Filipowski (6) – Duke	
Week 12 – Jan 30	Grant Basile – Virginia Tech	Kyle Filipowski (7) – Duke	
Week 13 – Feb 6	Jeremy Roach – Duke	Dereck Lively II – Duke	
Week 13 – Feb 6	Nijel Pack – Miami	Dereck Lively II – Duke	
Week 14 – Feb 13	Tyree Appleby – Wake Forest	Chas Kelly III – Boston College	
Week 14 – Feb 13	Tyree Appleby – Wake Forest	Judah Mintz (4) – Syracuse	
Week 15 – Feb 20	El Ellis – Louisville	Kyle Filipowski (8) – Duke	
Week 15 – Feb 20	Jarkel Joiner (2) – NC State	Kyle Filipowski (8) – Duke	
Week 16 – Feb 27	Hunter Tyson (2) – Clemson	Judah Mintz (5) – Syracuse	
Week 17 – Mar 6	Miles Kelly – Georgia Tech	Kyle Filipowski (9) – Duke	

=== Records against other conferences ===
2022–23 records against non-conference foes. Records shown for regular season only. Statistics through games played on February 17, 2023.

Power 6 Conferences & Gonzaga	Record
American	1–3
Big East	4–5
Big Ten	13–12
Big 12	2–5
Pac-12	2–2
SEC	3–8
Gonzaga	0–0
Power 7 Total	25–36
Other NCAA Division I conferences	Record
America East	1–3
A-10	7–3
ASUN	8–3
Big Sky	0–0
Big South	7–0
Big West	0–0
CAA	12–1
C-USA	2–0
Horizon League	3–1
Ivy League	3–0
MAAC	1–1
MAC	2–0
MEAC	6–0
MVC	0–0
Mountain West	1–0
NEC	5–0
OVC	2–0
Patriot League	5–1
Pacific West	0–0
SoCon	5–0
Southland	0–0
SWAC	5–0
The Summit	0–0
Sun Belt	6–2
WAC	1–1
WCC (not including Gonzaga)	1–1
Other Division I total	83–17
NCAA Division I total	109–53
NCAA Division II total	2–0

== Postseason ==
=== ACC tournament ===
- The 2023 Atlantic Coast Conference Basketball Tournament was held at the Greensboro Coliseum in Greensboro, North Carolina, from March 7 to 11, 2023.

First round
12	Florida State	60
13	Georgia Tech	61
10	Boston College	80
15	Louisville	62
11	Virginia Tech	67
14	Notre Dame	64

Second round
8	Syracuse	74
9	Wake Forest	77
5	Pittsburgh	89
13	Georgia Tech	81
7	North Carolina	85
10	Boston College	61
6	NC State	97
11	Virginia Tech	77

Quarterfinals
1	Miami	74
9	Wake Forest	72
4	Duke	96
5	Pittsburgh	69
2	Virginia	68
7	North Carolina	59
3	Clemson	80
6	NC State	54

Semifinals
1	Miami	78
4	Duke	85
2	Virginia	76
3	Clemson	56

Championship
4	Duke	59
2	Virginia	49

* – Denotes overtime period

=== NCAA tournament ===
Seed	Region	School	First Four	1st round	2nd round	Sweet 16	Elite Eight	Final Four	Championship
4	South	Virginia	Bye	L 67–68 vs. #13 Furman – (Orlando, FL)					
5	Midwest	Miami (FL)	Bye	W 63–56 vs. #12 Drake – (Albany, NY)	W 85–69 vs. #4 Indiana – (Albany, NY)	W 89–75 vs. #1 Houston – (Kansas City, MO)	W 88–81 vs. #2 Texas – (Kansas City, MO)	L 59–72 vs. #4 UConn – (Houston, TX)	
5	East	Duke	Bye	W 74–51 vs. #12 Oral Roberts – (Orlando, FL)	L 52–65 vs. #4 Tennessee – (Orlando, FL)				
11	South	NC State	Bye	L 63–72 vs. #6 Creighton – (Denver, CO)					
11	Midwest	Pittsburgh	W 60–59 vs. #11 Mississippi State – (Datyon, OH)	W 59–41 vs. #6 Iowa State – (Greensboro, NC)	L 73–84 vs. #3 Xavier – (Greensboro, NC)				
		W–L (%):	1–0 (1.000)	3–2 (.600)	1–2 (.333)	1–0 (1.000)	1–0 (1.000)	0–1 (.000)	0–0 (–) Total: 7–5 (.583)

=== National Invitation Tournament ===
Seed	Bracket	School	1st round	2nd round	Quarterfinals	Semifinals	Championship
1	Clemson	Clemson	L 64–68 vs. Morehead State – (Clemson, SC)				
—	Rutgers	Virginia Tech	L 72–81 vs. #4 Cincinnati – (Cincinnati, OH)				
		W–L (%):	0–2 (.000)	0–0 (–)	0–0 (–)	0–0 (–)	0–0 (–) Total: 0–2 (.000)

== Honors and awards ==
=== All-Americans ===
Consensus All-Americans
First Team	Second Team
None	None

To earn "consensus" status, a player must win honors based on a point system computed from the four different all-America teams. The point system consists of three points for first team, two points for second team and one point for third team. No honorable mention or fourth team or lower are used in the computation. The top five totals plus ties are first team and the next five plus ties are second team.

Associated Press	NABC	Sporting News	USBWA
First team
None	None	None	None
Second team
None	None	None	None
Third team
Armando Bacot	Isaiah Wong	Armando Bacot	Armando Bacot

=== ACC awards ===
2022–23 ACC men's basketball individual awards
Award	Recipient(s)
Player of the Year	Isaiah Wong – Miami
Coach of the Year	Jeff Capel – Pittsburgh
Defensive Player of the Year	Reece Beekman – Virginia
Rookie of the Year	Kyle Filipowski – Duke
Most Improved Player of the Year	Quinten Post – Boston College
Sixth Man Award	Nike Sibande – Pittsburgh

2022–23 ACC men's basketball all-conference teams
First team	Second team	Third team	Honorable mention
Isaiah Wong – Miami; Armando Bacot – North Carolina; Tyree Appleby – Wake Forest; Hunter Tyson – Clemson; Jamarius Burton – Pittsburgh	Kyle Filipowski – Duke; Terquavion Smith – NC State; Jarkel Joiner – NC State; Jordan Miller – Miami; Blake Hinson – Pittsburgh	Norchad Omier – Miami; PJ Hall – Clemson; Kihei Clark – Virginia; Jesse Edwards – Syracuse; Reece Beekman – Virginia	El Ellis – Louisville; Grant Basile – Virginia Tech; Judah Mintz – Syracuse; Jeremy Roach – Duke; Quinten Post – Boston College; Jayden Gardner – Virginia; R. J. Davis – North Carolina; D. J. Burns – NC State; Caleb Love – North Carolina

2022–23 ACC men's basketball all-freshman team
Player	Team
Kyle Filipowski	Duke
Judah Mintz	Syracuse
Tyrese Proctor	Duke
JJ Starling	Notre Dame
Dereck Lively II	Duke

2022–23 ACC men's basketball all-defensive team
Player	Team
Reece Beekman	Virginia
Jesse Edwards	Syracuse
Leaky Black	North Carolina
Dereck Lively II	Duke
Kihei Clark	Virginia

== NBA draft ==
The ACC had five players selected in the 2023 NBA draft.

PG	Point guard	SG	Shooting guard	SF	Small forward	PF	Power forward	C	Center

Player	Team	Round	Pick #	Position	School
Dereck Lively II	Oklahoma City Thunder	1	12	C	Duke
Dariq Whitehead	Brooklyn Nets	1	22	SG	Duke
Hunter Tyson	Oklahoma City Thunder	2	37	SF	Clemson
Jordan Miller	Los Angeles Clippers	2	48	SF	Miami (FL)
Isaiah Wong	Indiana Pacers	2	55	PG	Miami (FL)

== Attendance ==
Team	Arena	Capacity	Game 1	Game 2	Game 3	Game 4	Game 5	Game 6	Game 7	Game 8	Game 9	Game 10	Total	Average	% of Capacity
Team	Arena	Capacity	Game 11	Game 12	Game 13	Game 14	Game 15	Game 16	Game 17	Game 18	Game 19	Game 20	Total	Average	% of Capacity
Boston College	Conte Forum	8,606	4,239	4,830	3,811	4,432	3,259	3,749	4,012	4,194	7,000	4,655	83,679	5,230	60.77%
Boston College	Conte Forum	8,606	5,688	5,298	7,000	6,764	8,194	7,406	6,554				83,679	5,230	60.77%
Clemson	Littlejohn Coliseum	9,000	4,768	5,002	6,137	4,655	5,861	6,599	4,788	5,969	7,789	9,000	108,098	6,756	75.07%
Clemson	Littlejohn Coliseum	9,000	9,000	6,923	9,000	6,458	7,149	9,000					108,098	6,756	75.07%
Duke	Cameron Indoor Stadium	9,314	9,314	9,314	9,314	9,314	9,314	9,314	9,314	9,314	9,314	9,314	149,024	9,314	100%
Duke	Cameron Indoor Stadium	9,314	9,314	9,314	9,314	9,314	9,314	9,314					149,024	9,314	100%
Florida State	Donald L. Tucker Center	11,675	6,729	4,973	9,182	4,454	5,852	5,718	4,741	6,394	5,536	9,043	105,077	6,567	56.25%
Florida State	Donald L. Tucker Center	11,675	9,182	7,956	5,656	5,845	6,025	7,791					105,077	6,567	56.25%
Georgia Tech	McCamish Pavilion	8,600	3,072	3,269	3,379	3,494	5,810	3,798	4,763	5,371	4,203	5,325	80,125	4,713	54.81%
Georgia Tech	McCamish Pavilion	8,600	4,242	5,586	7,382	4,906	4,565	4,890	6,070				80,125	4,713	54.81%
Louisville	KFC Yum! Center	22,090	14,865	12,270	11,919	12,211	11,811	12,417	11,736	11,861	11,506	11,986	211,991	12,470	56.45%
Louisville	KFC Yum! Center	22,090	14,842	11,579	11,416	12,966	11,570	15,157	11,879				211,991	12,470	56.45%
Miami	Watsco Center	7,972	4,789	4,831	4,339	3,612	5,668	4,235	4,880	4,029	7,257	4,353	99,020	5,825	73.06%
Miami	Watsco Center	7,972	6,765	5,834	7,972	6,540	7,972	7,972	7,972				99,020	5,825	73.06%
North Carolina	Dean Smith Center	21,750	19,744	17,892	17,200	19,942	19,410	16,926	19,031	21,750	19,121	21,750	298,344	19,890	91.45%
North Carolina	Dean Smith Center	21,750	20,421	21,750	19,907	21,750	21,750						298,344	19,890	91.45%
NC State	PNC Arena	19,722	11,109	12,977	5,034	11,351	10,029	12,798	5,500	9,996	12,446	15,188	220,798	12,988	65.86%
NC State	PNC Arena	19,722	16,819	15,144	12,206	15,473	19,500	15,728	19,500				220,798	12,988	65.86%
Notre Dame	Edmund P. Joyce Center	9,149	4,698	4,940	4,433	6,552	4,863	7,854	5,702	4,986	7,098	6,151	116,248	6,118	66.87%
Notre Dame	Edmund P. Joyce Center	9,149	6,105	4,502	6,216	6,068	6,531	6,152	6,632	8,183	8,582		116,248	6,118	66.87%
Pittsburgh	Petersen Events Center	12,508	6,055	10,827	5,558	5,455	5,649	6,019	5,782	10,215	6,464	10,403	139,298	8,194	65.51%
Pittsburgh	Petersen Events Center	12,508	10,390	7,660	12,508	7,577	6,746	9,482	12,508				139,298	8,194	65.51%
Syracuse	Carrier Dome	33,000	17,755	17,836	15,668	15,892	17,368	20,370	19,262	16,578	15,417	17,693	343,828	19,102	57.88%
Syracuse	Carrier Dome	33,000	16,158	20,666	20,761	19,272	18,957	31,063	18,522	24,590			343,828	19,102	57.88%
Virginia	John Paul Jones Arena	14,593	13,238	13,487	13,882	14,280	14,193	14,629	14,269	14,217	14,629	14,629	227,511	14,219	97.44%
Virginia	John Paul Jones Arena	14,593	14,629	14,070	14,629	14,230	14,351	14,149					227,511	14,219	97.44%
Virginia Tech	Cassell Coliseum	8,925	7,899	7,541	7,936	8,925	7,870	8,925	7,702	7,587	7,539	8,925	134,399	8,400	94.12%
Virginia Tech	Cassell Coliseum	8,925	8,925	8,925	8,925	8,925	8,925	8,925					134,399	8,400	94.12%
Wake Forest	LJVM Coliseum	14,665	5,335	7,114	5,694	5,760	5,151	7,781	10,812	8,709	8,174	8,047	133,300	8,331	56.81%
Wake Forest	LJVM Coliseum	14,665	12,443	11,092	11,318	8,566	9,898	7,406					133,300	8,331	56.81%
