= 2022–23 Notre Dame Fighting Irish men's basketball team =

American college basketball season

2022–23 Notre Dame Fighting Irish men's basketball
- Conference: Atlantic Coast Conference
- Record: 11–21 (3–17 ACC)
- Head coach: Mike Brey (23rd season)
- Associate head coach: Anthony Solomon
- Assistant coaches: Antoni Wyche; Hamlet Tibbs
- Home arena: Joyce Center

2022–23 ACC men's basketball standings
	Conf.				Overall
Team	W		L	PCT	W		L	PCT
No. 16 Miami (FL)	15	–	5	.750	29	–	8	.784
No. 14 Virginia	15	–	5	.750	25	–	8	.758
Clemson	14	–	6	.700	23	–	11	.676
No. 12 Duke †	14	–	6	.700	27	–	9	.750
Pittsburgh	14	–	6	.700	24	–	12	.667
NC State	12	–	8	.600	23	–	11	.676
North Carolina	11	–	9	.550	20	–	13	.606
Wake Forest	10	–	10	.500	19	–	14	.576
Syracuse	10	–	10	.500	17	–	15	.531
Boston College	9	–	11	.450	16	–	17	.485
Virginia Tech	8	–	12	.400	19	–	15	.559
Florida State	7	–	13	.350	9	–	23	.281
Georgia Tech	6	–	14	.300	15	–	18	.455
Notre Dame	3	–	17	.150	11	–	21	.344
Louisville	2	–	18	.100	4	–	28	.125
† 2023 ACC tournament winner Rankings from AP poll

The 2022–23 Notre Dame Fighting Irish men's basketball team represented the University of Notre Dame, located in Notre Dame, Indiana, in the 2022–23 NCAA Division I men's basketball season. The team was led by head coach Mike Brey, in his 23rd and final season as head coach, and played home games at the on-campus Joyce Center as members of the Atlantic Coast Conference (ACC). The Irish finished the season 11–21, 3–17 in ACC play to finish in 14th place. They lost in the first round of the ACC tournament to Virginia Tech.

On January 20, 2023, Mike Brey announced he would step down as head coach following the season. On March 22, the school named Penn State head coach Micah Shrewsberry the team's new head coach.

== Previous season ==
The Fighting Irish finished the 2021–22 season 24–11, 15–5 in ACC Play to finish a tie for second place. As the No. 2 seed, they lost in the quarterfinals of the ACC tournament to No. 7 seed Virginia Tech. They received an at-large bid to the NCAA tournament as the No. 11 seed in the West Region, where they defeated Rutgers in the First Four and then upset Alabama to advance to the Second Round where they lost to Texas Tech.

== Offseason ==
=== Departures ===
Departures
Name	Number	Pos.	Height	Weight	Year	Hometown	Reason for departure
Paul Atkinson	20	F	6'9"	230	GS	West Palm Beach, FL	Graduated
Prentiss Hubb	3	G	6'3"	176	Senior	Upper Marlboro, MD	Graduated
Elijah Morgan	31	G	6'1"	169	Junior	New Orleans, LA	Walk-on; transferred to The Citadel
Elijah Taylor	22	F	6'8"	242	Sophomore	Philadelphia, PA	Transferred to Quinnipiac
Blake Wesley	0	G	6'5"	185	Freshman	South Bend, IN	Declared for 2022 NBA draft; selected 25th overall by the San Antonio Spurs

=== Incoming transfers ===
Incoming transfers
Name	Number	Pos.	Height	Weight	Year	Hometown	Previous school
Marcus Hammond	10	G	6'4"	188	GS	Queens, NY	Niagara

=== 2022 recruiting class ===
College recruiting
Name	Hometown	School	Height	Weight	Commit date
Dom Campbell #17 C	Scarborough, ME	Phillips Exeter Academy	6 ft 9 in (2.06 m)	268 lb (122 kg)	Jul 21, 2021
Dom Campbell #17 C	Recruit ratings: Rivals: 247Sports: On3: ESPN: (80)				
JJ Starling #4 CG	Baldwinsville, NY	La Lumiere	6 ft 4 in (1.93 m)	200 lb (91 kg)	Oct 12, 2021
JJ Starling #4 CG	Recruit ratings: Rivals: 247Sports: On3: ESPN: (91)				
Ven-Allen Lubin #20 SF	Orlando, FL	Orlando Christian Prep	6 ft 8 in (2.03 m)	226 lb (103 kg)	Nov 9, 2021
Ven-Allen Lubin #20 SF	Recruit ratings: Rivals: 247Sports: On3: ESPN: (83)				
Overall recruit ranking: Rivals: 15 247Sports: 22
Note: In many cases, Scout, Rivals, 247Sports, On3, and ESPN may conflict in their listings of height and weight.; In these cases, the average was taken. ESPN grades are on a 100-point scale.; Sources: "Notre Dame Fighting Irish". ESPN.; "2022 Team Ranking". Rivals.; "Notre Dame 2022 Basketball Commits". 247Sports.

== Roster ==
2022–23 Notre Dame Fighting Irish men's basketball team
Players
Coaches

Pos.	#	Name	Height	Weight	Year	Previous school	Hometown
G	24	Robby Carmody	6 ft 4 in (1.93 m)	205 lb (93 kg)	GS	Mars Area	Mars, PA
G	23	Dane Goodwin	6 ft 6 in (1.98 m)	214 lb (97 kg)	GS	Upper Arlington	Upper Arlington, OH
F	14	Nate Laszewski	6 ft 10 in (2.08 m)	230 lb (104 kg)	GS	Northfield Mount Hermon	Jupiter, FL
G	5	Cormac Ryan	6 ft 5 in (1.96 m)	195 lb (88 kg)	GS	Milton Academy; Stanford	New York, NY
G	3	Trey Wertz	6 ft 5 in (1.96 m)	193 lb (88 kg)	GS	Providence Day; Santa Clara	Charlotte, NC
G	10	Marcus Hammond	6 ft 4 in (1.93 m)	188 lb (85 kg)	GS	Cardozo; Niagara	Queens, NY
F	25	Matt Zona	6 ft 9 in (2.06 m)	242 lb (110 kg)	Jr	Bergen Catholic	Blauvelt, NY
G	12	Tony Sanders Jr.	6 ft 7 in (2.01 m)	215 lb (98 kg)	Jr	Gulliver Prep	Miami, FL
G	20	J.R. Konieczny (redshirt)	6 ft 7 in (2.01 m)	202 lb (92 kg)	So	St. Joseph	South Bend, IN
G	4	Alex Wade (W) (redshirt)	6 ft 0 in (1.83 m)	170 lb (77 kg)	So	Cathedral Catholic	San Diego, CA
F	13	Dom Campbell	6 ft 9 in (2.06 m)	268 lb (122 kg)	Fr	Phillips Exeter Academy	Scarborough, ME
G	1	JJ Starling	6 ft 4 in (1.93 m)	200 lb (91 kg)	Fr	La Lumiere	Baldwinsville, NY
F	2	Ven-Allen Lubin	6 ft 8 in (2.03 m)	226 lb (103 kg)	Fr	Orlando Christian Prep	Orlando, FL

Head coach

- Mike Brey (George Washington)

Assistant coach(es)

- Anthony Solomon (Virginia)
- Antoni Wyche (Notre Dame)
- Hamlet Tibbs (West Virginia)

Legend

- (C) Team captain
- (S) Suspended
- (I) Ineligible
- (W) Walk-on
- Injured
- Current redshirt

Roster
Last update: October 6, 2022

== Schedule and results ==
Date time, TV	Rank^{#}	Opponent^{#}	Result	Record	High points	High rebounds	High assists	Site (attendance) city, state
Exhibition
November 2, 2022*; 7:00 p.m.		Xavier (La.)	W 67–52	–	21 – Goodwin	10 – Goodwin	3 – Goodwin	Joyce Center (4,289); South Bend, IN
Regular season
November 10, 2022*; 7:00 p.m., ACCN		Radford	W 79–76	1–0	28 – Laszewski	12 – Laszewski	4 – Wertz	Joyce Center (4,698); South Bend, IN
November 13, 2022*; 4:00 p.m., ACCRSN		Youngstown State	W 88–81	2–0	20 – Goodwin	10 – Laszewski	3 – Tied	Joyce Center (4,940); South Bend, IN
November 16, 2022*; 8:00 p.m., ACCN		Southern Indiana; Gotham Classic	W 82–70	3–0	20 – Wertz	10 – Laszewski	3 – Tied	Joyce Center (4,433); South Bend, IN
November 18, 2022*; 7:00 p.m., ACCNX/ESPN+		Lipscomb	W 66–65	4–0	24 – Goodwin	9 – Laszewski	4 – Tied	Joyce Center (6,552); South Bend, IN
November 22, 2022*; 6:30 p.m., ACCN		Bowling Green; Gotham Classic	W 82–66	5–0	23 – Starling	6 – Tied	6 – Wertz	Joyce Center (4,863); South Bend, IN
November 25, 2022*; 4:00 p.m., ESPN+		vs. St. Bonaventure; Gotham Classic	L 51–63	5–1	11 – Laszweski	13 – Lubin	6 – Wertz	UBS Arena (5,178); Elmont, NY
November 30, 2022*; 9:15 p.m., ESPN2		No. 20 Michigan State; ACC–Big Ten Challenge	W 70–52	6–1	23 – Ryan	8 – Laszewski	7 – Wertz	Joyce Center (7,854); South Bend, IN
December 3, 2022; 12:00 p.m., ESPN2		Syracuse	L 61–62	6–2 (0–1)	16 – Goodwin	9 – Goodwin	3 – Tied	Joyce Center (5,702); South Bend, IN
December 7, 2022*; 7:00 p.m., ACCNX/ESPN+		Boston University	W 81–75	7–2	21 – Cormac	9 – Laszewski	4 – Wertz	Joyce Center (4,986); South Bend, IN
December 11, 2022*; 4:00 p.m., ESPN2		Marquette	L 64–79	7–3	20 – Laszewski	7 – Laszewksi	4 – Goodwin	Joyce Center (7,098); South Bend, IN
December 18, 2022*; 5:30 p.m., ESPN2		vs. Georgia; Holiday Hoopsgiving	L 62–77	7–4	20 – Laszewski	6 – Ryan	4 – Tied	State Farm Arena (3,087); Atlanta, GA
December 21, 2022; 8:30 p.m., ACCN		at Florida State	L 72–73	7–5 (0–2)	20 – Starling	6 – Tied	4 – Wertz	Donald L. Tucker Civic Center (6,394); Tallahassee, FL
December 27, 2022*; 7:00 p.m., ACCN		Jacksonville	W 59–43	8–5	15 – Hammond	8 – Starling	3 – Tied	Joyce Center (6,151); South Bend, IN
December 30, 2022; 2:00 p.m., ACCN		No. 14 Miami (FL)	L 65–76	8–6 (0–3)	15 – Wertz	9 – Tied	5 – Ryan	Joyce Center (6,105); South Bend, IN
January 3, 2023; 7:00 p.m., ACCN		at Boston College	L 63–70	8–7 (0–4)	16 – Tied	6 – Tied	3 – Laszewski	Conte Forum (4,194); Chestnut Hill, MA
January 7, 2023; 11:30 a.m., ESPN2		at North Carolina	L 64–81	8–8 (0–5)	17 – Laszewski	8 – Laszewski	3 – Tied	Dean Smith Center (21,750); Chapel Hill, NC
January 10, 2023; 7:00 p.m., ACCN		Georgia Tech	W 73–72 ^{OT}	9–8 (1–5)	19 – Goodwin	12 – Goodwin	3 – Tied	Joyce Center (4,502); South Bend, IN
January 14, 2023; 7:00 p.m., ACCN		at Syracuse	L 73–78	9–9 (1–6)	18 – Hammond	10 – Laszewski	6 – Goodwin	JMA Wireless Dome (20,666); Syracuse, NY
January 17, 2023; 7:00 p.m., ESPNU		Florida State	L 71–84	9–10 (1–7)	19 – Hammond	8 – Goodwin	5 – Wertz	Joyce Center (6,216); South Bend, IN
January 21, 2023; 2:00 p.m., ACCRSN		Boston College	L 72–84	9–11 (1–8)	29 – Laszewski	7 – Laszewski	4 – Ryan	Joyce Center (6,068); South Bend, IN
January 24, 2023; 7:00 p.m., ACCN		at NC State	L 82–85	9–12 (1–9)	19 – Ryan	10 – Hammond	4 – Hammond	PNC Arena (15,144); Raleigh, NC
January 28, 2023; 12:00 p.m., ESPN2		Louisville	W 76–62	10–12 (2–9)	22 – Starling	10 – Goodwin	8 – Ryan	Joyce Center (6,531); South Bend, IN
February 4, 2023; 1:00 p.m., ACCRSN		Wake Forest	L 64–81	10–13 (2–10)	18 – Laszewski	7 – Tied	4 – Wertz	Joyce Center (6,152); South Bend, IN
February 8, 2023; 7:00 p.m., ACCRSN		at Georgia Tech	L 68–70	10–14 (2–11)	16 – Laszewski	7 – Tied	4 – Goodwin	McCamish Pavilion (4,906); Atlanta, GA
February 11, 2023; 2:00 p.m., ACCRSN		Virginia Tech	L 87–93	10–15 (2–12)	33 – Laszewski	8 – Laszewski	4 – Hammond	Joyce Center (6,632); South Bend, IN
February 14, 2023; 7:00 p.m., ESPN		at Duke	L 64–68	10–16 (2–13)	25 – Goodwin	8 – Laszewski	2 – Tied	Cameron Indoor Stadium (9,314); Durham, NC
February 18, 2023; 12:00 p.m., ESPN2		at No. 7 Virginia	L 55–57	10–17 (2–14)	18 – Laszewski	8 – Laszewski	5 – Wertz	John Paul Jones Arena (14,230); Charlottesville, VA
February 22, 2023; 9:00 p.m., ESPN		North Carolina	L 59–63	10–18 (2–15)	14 – Ryan	9 – Laszewski	3 – Tied	Joyce Center (8,183); South Bend, IN
February 25, 2023; 7:00 p.m., ACCN		at Wake Forest	L 58–66	10–19 (2–16)	19 – Lubin	8 – Lubin	5 – Wertz	LJVM Coliseum (9,898); Winston-Salem, NC
March 1, 2023; 7:00 p.m., ESPNU		No. 25 Pittsburgh	W 88–81	11–19 (3–16)	20 – Tied	8 – Laszewski	5 – Wertz	Joyce Center (8,582); South Bend, IN
March 4, 2023; 8:00 p.m., ACCN		at Clemson	L 64–87	11–20 (3–17)	19 – Ryan	9 – Laszewski	4 – Wertz	Littlejohn Coliseum (9,000); Clemson, SC
ACC tournament
March 7, 2023; 7:00 p.m., ACCN	(14)	vs. (11) Virginia Tech; First round	L 64–67	11–21	23 – Hammond	6 – Laszewski	4 – Wertz	Greensboro Coliseum (7,231); Greensboro, NC
*Non-conference game. ^{#}Rankings from AP Poll. (#) Tournament seedings in parentheses. All times are in Eastern Time.

== Rankings ==
Ranking movements Legend: ██ Increase in ranking ██ Decrease in ranking — = Not ranked RV = Received votes
	Week																			
Poll	Pre	1	2	3	4	5	6	7	8	9	10	11	12	13	14	15	16	17	18	Final
AP	RV	RV	—	—	—	—	—	—	—	—	—	—	—	—	—	—	—	—	—	Not released
Coaches	—	—	—	—	—	—	—	—	—	—	—	—	—	—	—	—	—	—	—	—

*AP does not release post-NCAA Tournament rankings
