= 2022–23 Wake Forest Demon Deacons men's basketball team =

American college basketball season

2022–23 Wake Forest Demon Deacons men's basketball
- Conference: Atlantic Coast Conference
- Record: 19–14 (10–10 ACC)
- Head coach: Steve Forbes (3rd season)
- Assistant coaches: BJ McKie; Brooks Savage; Matt Woodley
- Home arena: LJVM Coliseum

2022–23 ACC men's basketball standings
	Conf.				Overall
Team	W		L	PCT	W		L	PCT
No. 16 Miami (FL)	15	–	5	.750	29	–	8	.784
No. 14 Virginia	15	–	5	.750	25	–	8	.758
Clemson	14	–	6	.700	23	–	11	.676
No. 12 Duke †	14	–	6	.700	27	–	9	.750
Pittsburgh	14	–	6	.700	24	–	12	.667
NC State	12	–	8	.600	23	–	11	.676
North Carolina	11	–	9	.550	20	–	13	.606
Wake Forest	10	–	10	.500	19	–	14	.576
Syracuse	10	–	10	.500	17	–	15	.531
Boston College	9	–	11	.450	16	–	17	.485
Virginia Tech	8	–	12	.400	19	–	15	.559
Florida State	7	–	13	.350	9	–	23	.281
Georgia Tech	6	–	14	.300	15	–	18	.455
Notre Dame	3	–	17	.150	11	–	21	.344
Louisville	2	–	18	.100	4	–	28	.125
† 2023 ACC tournament winner Rankings from AP poll

The 2022–23 Wake Forest Demon Deacons men's basketball team represented Wake Forest University during the 2022–23 NCAA Division I men's basketball season. The Demon Deacons were led by third-year head coach Steve Forbes and played their home games at the Lawrence Joel Veterans Memorial Coliseum in Winston-Salem, North Carolina as members of the Atlantic Coast Conference. They finished the season 19–14, 10–10 in ACC play to finish in a tie for eighth place. As the ninth seed in the ACC tournament they defeated Syracuse before losing to Miami in the quarterfinals.

== Previous season ==
The Demon Deacons finished 2021–22 season 25–10, 13–7 in ACC play, to finish in fifth place. They lost to Boston College in the second round of the ACC tournament. They received an at-large bid to the National Invitation Tournament, where they defeated Towson and VCU in the first two rounds. Their season then ended in a quarterfinal loss to Texas A&M.

== Offseason ==
=== Departures ===
Departures
Name	Number	Pos.	Height	Weight	Year	Hometown	Reason for departure
Jake LaRavia	0	F	6'8"	235	Junior	Indianapolis, IN	Declare for 2022 NBA draft
Isaiah Mucius	1	F	6'8"	205	Senior	East Patchogue, NY	Graduated
Carter Whitt	11	G	6'3"	180	RS Freshman	Raleigh, NC	Transferred to Furman
Dallas Walton	13	F/C	7'0"	230	GS Senior	Arvada, CO	Graduated
Khadim Sy	20	F	6'10"	240	GS Senior	Dakra, Senegal	Graduated
Alondes Williams	31	G	6'5"	210	GS Senior	Milwaukee, WI	Graduated/undrafted in 2022 NBA draft
Anthony Mathis Jr.	45	G	6'0"	185	RS Senior	Louisville, KY	Walk-on; left the team for personal reasons
Miles Lester	55	G	6'0"	180	RS Senior	Wichita, KS	Walk-on; left the team for personal reasons

=== Incoming transfers ===
Incoming transfers
Name	Number	Pos.	Height	Weight	Year	Hometown	Previous school
Tyree Appleby	1	G	6'1"	163	GS Senior	Jacksonville, AR	Florida
Jao Ituka	10	G	6'1"	196	Sophomore	Gaithersburg, MD	Marist
Andrew Carr	11	F	6'9"	220	Junior	West Chester, PA	Delaware
Davion Bradford	20	F	7'0"	270	Junior	St. Louis, MO	Kansas State

=== 2022 recruiting class ===
College recruiting information
Name	Hometown	School	Height	Weight	Commit date
Zach Keller #24 C	Highlands Ranch, CO	ThunderRidge High School	6 ft 9 in (2.06 m)	220 lb (100 kg)	Oct 11, 2021
Zach Keller #24 C	Recruit ratings: Scout: Rivals: 247Sports: ESPN: (81)				
Bobi Klintman #34 PF	Bel Aire, KS	Sunrise Christian Academy	6 ft 9 in (2.06 m)	200 lb (91 kg)	May 13, 2022
Bobi Klintman #34 PF	Recruit ratings: Scout: Rivals: 247Sports: ESPN: (80)				
Overall recruit ranking:
Note: In many cases, Scout, Rivals, 247Sports, On3, and ESPN may conflict in their listings of height and weight.; In these cases, the average was taken. ESPN grades are on a 100-point scale.; Sources: "Wake Forest Demon Deacons". ESPN.; "2022 Team Ranking". Rivals.

== Roster ==
2022–23 Wake Forest Demon Deacons men's basketball team
Players
Coaches

Pos.	#	Name	Height	Weight	Year	Previous school	Hometown
G	0	Lucas Taylor	6 ft 5 in (1.96 m)	195 lb (88 kg)	So	Heritage	Wake Forest, NC
G	1	Tyree Appleby	6 ft 1 in (1.85 m)	165 lb (75 kg)	GS	Jacksonville; Florida	Jacksonville, AR
G	2	Cameron Hildreth	6 ft 4 in (1.93 m)	195 lb (88 kg)	So	Surrey Scorchers	Worthing, England
G	4	Daivien Williamson	6 ft 1 in (1.85 m)	180 lb (82 kg)	GS	Winston-Salem Prep; ETSU	Winston-Salem, NC
G	10	Jao Ituka	6 ft 1 in (1.85 m)	196 lb (89 kg)	So	Gaithersburg; Marist	Gaithersburg, MD
F	11	Andrew Carr	6 ft 10 in (2.08 m)	220 lb (100 kg)	Jr	West Chester East; Delaware	West Chester, PA
G	13	Robert McCray	6 ft 4 in (1.93 m)	185 lb (84 kg)	So	AC Flora	Columbia, SC
F	20	Davion Bradford	7 ft 0 in (2.13 m)	270 lb (122 kg)	Jr	Mehlville; Kansas State	St. Louis, MO
F	25	Zach Keller	6 ft 10 in (2.08 m)	228 lb (103 kg)	Fr	ThunderRidge	Highlands Ranch, CO
G	30	Damari Monsanto	6 ft 6 in (1.98 m)	225 lb (102 kg)	RS Jr	Western; East Tennessee State	Pembroke Pines, FL
F/C	33	Matthew Marsh	7 ft 1 in (2.16 m)	250 lb (113 kg)	So	ASVEL Lyon-Villeurbanne	Cornwall, England
F	34	Bobi Klintman	6 ft 10 in (2.08 m)	225 lb (102 kg)	Fr	Sunrise Christian Academy	Malmö, Sweden
G	40	RJ Kennah (W)	6 ft 5 in (1.96 m)	195 lb (88 kg)	So	Kent Denver	Parker, CO
G	45	Xiaolong Xu (W)	6 ft 1 in (1.85 m)	180 lb (82 kg)	Jr	Concord Academy	Beijing, China
G	51	Kevin Dunn (W)	6 ft 2 in (1.88 m)	205 lb (93 kg)	So	Choate Rosemary Hall	Winston-Salem, NC
F	52	Grant van Beveren (W)	6 ft 6 in (1.98 m)	215 lb (98 kg)	Sr	Chattahoochee	Alpharetta, GA
F	55	Owen Kmety (W)	6 ft 6 in (1.98 m)	180 lb (82 kg)	Fr	La Lumiere School	Chicago, IL

Head coach

- Steve Forbes (Southern Arkansas University)

Assistant coach(es)

- BJ McKie (South Carolina)
- Brooks Savage (Tennessee)
- Matt Woodley (Drake)

Legend

- (C) Team captain
- (S) Suspended
- (I) Ineligible
- (W) Walk-on
- Injured
- Current redshirt

Roster

== Schedule and results ==
Date time, TV	Rank^{#}	Opponent^{#}	Result	Record	High points	High rebounds	High assists	Site (attendance) city, state
Exhibition
November 1, 2022*; 7:00 p.m.		Winston-Salem State; Winston-Salem Tip Off Classic	W 82–69	–	25 – Williamson	7 – Keller	4 – Tied≈	LJVM Coliseum; Winston-Salem, NC
Regular season
November 7, 2022*; 8:00 p.m., ACCNX/ESPN+		Fairfield	W 71–59	1–0	14 – 3 tied	6 – Klintman	3 – Tied	LJVM Coliseum (5,335); Winston-Salem, NC
November 11, 2022*; 8:30 p.m., ACCN		Georgia	W 81–71	2–0	24 – Williamson	11 – Hildreth	6 – Appleby	LJVM Coliseum (7,114); Winston-Salem, NC
November 15, 2022*; 7:00 p.m., ACCNX/ESPN+		Utah Valley; Jamaica Classic campus site game	W 68–65 ^{OT}	3–0	23 – Appleby	14 – Carr	6 – Appleby	LJVM Coliseum (5,694); Winston-Salem, NC
November 18, 2022*; 2:00 p.m., CBSSN		vs. La Salle; Jamaica Classic Semifinal	W 75–63	4–0	23 – Appleby	6 – Tied	4 – Tied	Montego Bay Convention Centre; Montego Bay, Jamaica
November 20, 2022*; 2:30 p.m., CBSSN		vs. Loyola Marymount; Jamaica Classic Final	L 75–77 ^{OT}	4–1	19 – Appleby	8 – Tied	8 – Appleby	Montego Bay Convention Centre; Montego Bay, Jamaica
November 23, 2022*; 8:30 p.m., ACCN		South Carolina State	W 105–74	5–1	19 – Hildreth	10 – Klintman	9 – Appleby	LJVM Coliseum (5,760); Winston-Salem, NC
November 26, 2022*; 12:30 p.m., ACCN		Hampton	W 97–70	6–1	20 – Monsanto	11 – Hildreth	10 – Hildreth	LJVM Coliseum (5,151); Winston-Salem, NC
November 29, 2022*; 9:00 p.m., ESPNU		at Wisconsin; ACC–Big Ten Challenge	W 78–75	7–1	32 – Appleby	9 – Marsh	5 – Appleby	Kohl Center (14,435); Madison, WI
December 2, 2022; 7:00 p.m., ACCRSN		at Clemson	L 57–77	7–2 (0–1)	12 – Williamson	6 – Tied	5 – Appleby	Littlejohn Coliseum (6,599); Clemson, SC
December 10, 2022*; 2:00 p.m., ESPNU		vs. LSU; Holiday Hoopsgiving	L 70–72	7–3	26 – Appleby	11 – Marsh	6 – Appleby	State Farm Arena (7,795); Atlanta, GA
December 14, 2022*; 7:00 p.m., ACCN		Appalachian State	W 67–66	8–3	20 – Carr	6 – Tied	4 – Appleby	LJVM Coliseum (7,781); Winston-Salem, NC
December 17, 2022*; 12:00 p.m., BTN		at Rutgers	L 57–81	8–4	22 – Monsanto	5 – Tied	3 – Carr	Jersey Mike's Arena (8,000); Piscataway, NJ
December 20, 2022; 6:30 p.m., ACCN		No. 14 Duke	W 81–70	9–4 (1–1)	18 – Appleby	9 – Hildreth	8 – Appleby	LJVM Coliseum (10,812); Winston-Salem, NC
December 31, 2022; 12:00 p.m., ACCRSN		Virginia Tech	W 77–75	10–4 (2–1)	24 – Appleby	8 – Hildreth	7 – Appleby	LJVM Coliseum (8,709); Winston-Salem, NC
January 4, 2023; 9:00 p.m., ACCN		at North Carolina; Rivalry	L 79–88	10–5 (2–2)	17 – Monsanto	9 – Carr	9 – Appleby	Dean Smith Center (19,031); Chapel Hill, NC
January 7, 2023; 3:00 p.m., ACCN		at Louisville	W 80–72	11–5 (3–2)	21 – Monsanto	8 – Tied	8 – Appleby	KFC Yum! Center (11,986); Louisville, KY
January 11, 2023; 9:00 p.m., ACCN		Florida State	W 90–75	12–5 (4–2)	23 – Hildreth	6 – Hildreth	8 – Appleby	LJVM Coliseum (8,174); Winston-Salem, NC
January 14, 2023; 8:00 p.m., ESPN2		at Boston College	W 85–63	13–5 (5–2)	21 – Carr	13 – Carr	7 – Appleby	Conte Forum (4,655); Chestnut Hill, MA
January 17, 2023; 9:00 p.m., ACCRSN		No. 19 Clemson	W 87–77	14–5 (6–2)	24 – Appleby	11 – Carr	7 – Appleby	LJVM Coliseum (8,047); Winston-Salem, NC
January 21, 2023; 2:00 p.m., ESPNU		No. 10 Virginia	L 67–76	14–6 (6–3)	25 – Monsanto	10 – Carr	5 – Appleby	LJVM Coliseum (12,443); Winston-Salem, NC
January 25, 2023; 7:00 p.m., ACCN		at Pittsburgh	L 79–81	14–7 (6–4)	15 – Tied	7 – Tied	7 – Appleby	Peterson Events Center (7,660); Pittsburgh, PA
January 28, 2023; 1:00 p.m., ACCN		NC State; Rivalry	L 77–79	14–8 (6–5)	22 – Monsanto	9 – Carr	7 – Appleby	LJVM Coliseum (11,092); Winston-Salem, NC
January 31, 2023; 7:00 p.m., ESPN		at Duke	L 73–75	14–9 (6–6)	27 – Appleby	5 – Tied	4 – Appleby	Cameron Indoor Stadium (9,314); Durham, NC
February 4, 2023; 1:00 p.m., ACCRSN		at Notre Dame	W 81–64	15–9 (7–6)	28 – Monsanto	9 – Appleby	7 – Appleby	Joyce Center (6,152); South Bend, IN
February 7, 2023; 7:00 p.m., ESPN		North Carolina; Rivalry	W 92–85	16–9 (8–6)	35 – Appleby	7 – Tied	11 – Appleby	LJVM Coliseum (11,318); Winston-Salem, NC
February 11, 2023; 5:00 p.m., ACCN		Georgia Tech	W 71–70	17–9 (9–6)	19 – Hildreth	9 – Monsanto	6 – Appleby	LJVM Coliseum (8566); Winston-Salem, NC
February 18, 2023; 2:00 p.m., ACCRSN		at No. 15 Miami (FL)	L 87–96	17–10 (9–7)	15 – Appleby	12 – Klintman	9 – Appleby	Watsco Center (7,972); Coral Gables, FL
February 22, 2023; 9:00 p.m., ACCRSN		at NC State; Rivalry	L 74–90	17–11 (9–8)	19 – Appleby	7 – Marsh	4 – Appleby	PNC Arena (15,728); Raleigh, NC
February 25, 2023; 7:00 p.m., ACCN		Notre Dame	W 66–58	18–11 (10–8)	21 – Appleby	12 – Klintman	6 – Appleby	LJVM Coliseum (9,898); Winston-Salem, NC
February 28, 2023; 7:00 p.m., ESPNU		Boston College	L 69–71	18–12 (10–9)	23 – Appleby	8 – Klintman	6 – Appleby	LJVM Coliseum (7,406); Winston-Salem, NC
March 4, 2023; 5:00 p.m., ACCRSN		at Syracuse	L 63–72	18–13 (10–10)	21 – Appleby	8 – Carr	8 – Appleby	JMA Wireless Dome (24,590); Syracuse, NY
ACC tournament
March 8, 2023; 12:00 p.m., ESPN	(9)	vs. (8) Syracuse; Second round	W 77–74	19–13	17 – Tied	11 – Klintman	12 – Appleby	Greensboro Coliseum (17,685); Greensboro, NC
March 9, 2023; 12:00 p.m., ESPN	(9)	vs. (1) No. 14 Miami; Quarterfinals	L 72–74	19–14	24 – Appleby	11 – Klintman	7 – Hildreth	Greensboro Coliseum (13,920); Greensboro, NC
*Non-conference game. ^{#}Rankings from AP Poll. (#) Tournament seedings in parentheses. All times are in Eastern Time.

== Rankings ==
Ranking movements Legend: ██ Increase in ranking ██ Decrease in ranking — = Not ranked RV = Received votes
	Week																			
Poll	Pre	1	2	3	4	5	6	7	8	9	10	11	12	13	14	15	16	17	18	Final
AP	—	—	—	—	—	—	—	—	—	—	—	RV	—	—	—	—	—	—	—	Not released
Coaches	—	—	—	—	—	—	—	—	—	—	—	RV	—	—	—	—	—	—	—	—

*AP does not release post-NCAA tournament rankings
^Coaches did not release a Week 2 poll.
