= 2023 ACC men's basketball tournament =

American college basketball competition

- 2023 ACC Tournament logo
- Classification: Division I
- Season: 2022–23
- Teams: 15
- Site: Greensboro Coliseum; Greensboro, North Carolina
- Champions: Duke (22nd title)
- Winning coach: Jon Scheyer (1st title)
- MVP: Kyle Filipowski (Duke)
- Television: ESPN, ESPN2, ACCN

2022–23 ACC men's basketball standings
	Conf.				Overall
Team	W		L	PCT	W		L	PCT
No. 16 Miami (FL)	15	–	5	.750	29	–	8	.784
No. 14 Virginia	15	–	5	.750	25	–	8	.758
Clemson	14	–	6	.700	23	–	11	.676
No. 12 Duke †	14	–	6	.700	27	–	9	.750
Pittsburgh	14	–	6	.700	24	–	12	.667
NC State	12	–	8	.600	23	–	11	.676
North Carolina	11	–	9	.550	20	–	13	.606
Wake Forest	10	–	10	.500	19	–	14	.576
Syracuse	10	–	10	.500	17	–	15	.531
Boston College	9	–	11	.450	16	–	17	.485
Virginia Tech	8	–	12	.400	19	–	15	.559
Florida State	7	–	13	.350	9	–	23	.281
Georgia Tech	6	–	14	.300	15	–	18	.455
Notre Dame	3	–	17	.150	11	–	21	.344
Louisville	2	–	18	.100	4	–	28	.125
† 2023 ACC tournament winner Rankings from AP poll

The 2023 ACC men's basketball tournament was the postseason men's basketball tournament for the Atlantic Coast Conference held at the Greensboro Coliseum in Greensboro, North Carolina, from March 7 to 11, 2023. It was the 70th annual edition of the tournament. The Duke Blue Devils won the tournament, their twenty-second ACC Tournament title, receiving the conference's automatic bid to the 2023 NCAA tournament. The tournament marked the last game of Jim Boeheim's 47 year coaching career at Syracuse.

== Seeds ==
All 15 ACC teams participated in the tournament. Teams were seeded by record within the conference, with a tiebreaker system to seed teams with identical conference records.

Seed	School	Conference Record	Tiebreaker
1	Miami	15–5	1–0 vs. Virginia
2	Virginia	15–5	0–1 vs. Miami
3	Clemson	14–6	2–0 vs. Duke/Pittsburgh
4	Duke	14–6	1–1 vs. Clemson/Pittsburgh
5	Pittsburgh	14–6	0–2 vs. Clemson/Duke
6	NC State	12–8	
7	North Carolina	11–9	
8	Syracuse	10–10	1–0 vs. Wake Forest
9	Wake Forest	10–10	0–1 vs. Syracuse
10	Boston College	9–11	
11	Virginia Tech	8–12	
12	Florida State	7–13	
13	Georgia Tech	6–14	
14	Notre Dame	3–17	
15	Louisville	2–18	

== Schedule ==
Session	Game	Time	Matchup	Score	Television	Attendance	U.S. Viewers (Millions)
First round – Tuesday, March 7							
Opening day	1	2:00 pm	No. 12 Florida State vs. No. 13 Georgia Tech	60−61	ACCN	7,231	n/a
Opening day	2	4:30 pm	No. 10 Boston College vs. No. 15 Louisville	80–62	ACCN	7,231	n/a
Opening day	3	7:00 pm	No. 11 Virginia Tech vs. No. 14 Notre Dame	67–64	ACCN	7,231	n/a
Second round – Wednesday, March 8							
1	4	12:00 pm	No. 8 Syracuse vs. No. 9 Wake Forest	74–77	ESPN	n/a	0.61
1	5	2:30 pm	No. 5 Pittsburgh vs. No. 13 Georgia Tech	89–81	ESPN	n/a	0.72
2	6	7:00 pm	No. 7 North Carolina vs. No. 10 Boston College	85–61	ESPN2	17,685	0.89
2	7	9:30 pm	No. 6 NC State vs. No. 11 Virginia Tech	97–77	ESPN2	17,685	0.59
Quarterfinals – Thursday, March 9							
3	8	12:00 pm	No. 1 Miami vs. No. 9 Wake Forest	74–72	ESPN2	13,920	0.32
3	9	2:30 pm	No. 4 Duke vs. No. 5 Pittsburgh	96–69	ESPN2	13,920	0.51
4	10	7:00 pm	No. 2 Virginia vs. No. 7 North Carolina	68–59	ESPN	17,772	1.51
4	11	9:30 pm	No. 3 Clemson vs. No. 6 NC State	80–54	ESPN	17,772	0.89
Semifinals – Friday, March 10							
5	12	7:00 pm	No. 1 Miami vs. No. 4 Duke	78–85	ESPN2	15,316	1.35
5	13	9:30 pm	No. 2 Virginia vs. No. 3 Clemson	76–56	ESPN2	15,316	0.90
Championship – Saturday, March 11							
6	14	8:30pm	No. 2 Virginia vs. No. 4 Duke	49–59	ESPN	19,116	2.70
Game times in ET. Rankings denote tournament seed.							

== Bracket ==
First round Tuesday, March 7 ACCN
12	Florida State	60
13	Georgia Tech	61
10	Boston College	80
15	Louisville	62
11	Virginia Tech	67
14	Notre Dame	64

Second round Wednesday, March 8 ESPN/ESPN2
8	Syracuse	74
9	Wake Forest	77
5	Pittsburgh	89
13	Georgia Tech	81
7	North Carolina	85
10	Boston College	61
6	NC State	97
11	Virginia Tech	77

Quarterfinals; Thursday, March 9 ESPN/ESPN2
1	Miami	74
9	Wake Forest	72
4	Duke	96
5	Pittsburgh	69
2	Virginia	68
7	North Carolina	59
3	Clemson	80
6	NC State	54

Semifinals; Friday, March 10; ESPN2
1	Miami	78
4	Duke	85
2	Virginia	76
3	Clemson	56

Championship; Saturday, March 11; ESPN
4	Duke	59
2	Virginia	49

== Game summaries ==
=== First round ===
ACCN

March 7
2:00 p.m.

Report

No. 12 Florida State 60, No. 13 Georgia Tech 61
Scoring by half: 31–21, 29–40
Pts: Tied, 12; Rebs: Cam Corhen, 11; Asts: Tied, 4	Pts: Miles Kelly, 21; Rebs: Javon Franklin, 19; Asts: Kyle Sturdivant, 7

Greensboro Coliseum
Greensboro, NC
Attendance: 7,231
Referees: Jamie Luckie, Tommy Morrissey, Jerry Heater

ACCN

March 7
4:30 p.m.

Report

No. 10 Boston College 80, No. 15 Louisville 62
Scoring by half: 31–34, 49–28
Pts: Makai Ashton-Langford, 16; Rebs: T.J. Bickerstaff, 7 Asts: Jaeden Zackery, 8	Pts: El Ellis, 16; Rebs: Tied, 7 Asts: El Ellis, 5

Greensboro Coliseum
Greensboro, NC
Attendance: 7,231
Referees: Bill Covington, Mark Schnur, Jemel Spearman

ACCN

March 7
7:00 p.m.

Report

No. 11 Virginia Tech 67, No. 14 Notre Dame 64
Scoring by half: 33–32, 34–32
Pts: Grant Basile, 20; Rebs: Justyn Mutts, 13; Asts: Justyn Mutts, 4	Pts: Marcus Hammond, 23; Rebs: Nate Laszewski, 6 Asts: Trey Wertz, 4

Greensboro Coliseum
Greensboro, NC
Attendance: 7,231
Referees: Lee Cassell, A.J. Desai, Jeff Pon

=== Second round ===
ESPN

March 8
12:00 p.m.

Report

No. 8 Syracuse 74, No. 9 Wake Forest 77
Scoring by half: 35–33, 39–44
Pts: Tied, 18; Rebs: Benny Williams, 11; Asts: Judah Mintz, 7	Pts: Tied, 17; Rebs: Bobi, Klintman, 11; Asts: Tyree Appleby, 12

Greensboro Coliseum
Greensboro, NC
Referees: Ted Valentine, Mark Schnur, Tommy Morrissey

Davien Williamson hits the game winning 3 with 0.2 seconds left. This was the last game Jim Boeheim coached, as he retired following the loss.

ESPN

March 8
2:30 p.m.

Report

No. 5 Pittsburgh 89, No. 13 Georgia Tech 81
Scoring by half: 44–31, 45–50
Pts: Jamarius Burton, 21; Rebs: Blake Hinson, 9 Asts: Jamarius Burton, 8	Pts: Javon Franklin, 19; Rebs: Javon Franklin, 15; Asts: Kyle Sturdivant, 8

Greensboro Coliseum
Greensboro, NC
Referees: Raymie Styons, Bert Smith, Justin Porterfield

ESPN2

March 8
7:00 p.m.

Report

No. 7 North Carolina 85, No. 10 Boston College 61
Scoring by half: 43–29, 42–32
Pts: Caleb Love, 22; Rebs: Tied, 6 Asts: Leaky Black, 4	Pts: Makai Ashton-Langford, 16; Rebs: Quinten Post, 5 Asts: Makai Ashton-Langford, 3

Greensboro Coliseum
Greensboro, NC
Referees: Roger Ayers, Lee Cassell, Jerry Heater

ESPN2

March 8
9:30 p.m.

Report

No. 6 NC State 97, No. 11 Virginia Tech 77
Scoring by half: 53–26, 44–51
Pts: Terquavion Smith, 30; Rebs: Terquavion Smith, 8 Asts: Jarkel Joiner, 10	Pts: Rodney Rice, 17; Rebs: Justun Mutts, 5 Asts: Sean Pedulla, 4

Greensboro Coliseum
Greensboro, NC
Attendance: 17,685
Referees: Clarence Armstrong, Ron Groover, Jemel Spearman

=== Quarterfinals ===
ESPN2

March 9
12:00 p.m.

Report

No. 1 Miami 74, No. 9 Wake Forest 72
Scoring by half: 34–29, 40–43
Pts: Jordan Miller, 24; Rebs: Norchad Omier, 10; Asts: Tied, 5	Pts: Tyree Appleby, 24; Rebs: Bobi Klintman, 11; Asts: Cameron Hildreth, 7

Greensboro Coliseum
Greensboro, NC
Referees: Bill Covington, Justin Porterfield, Raymie Styons

ESPN2

March 9
2:30 p.m.

Report

No. 4 Duke 96, No. 5 Pittsburgh 69
Scoring by half: 48–32, 48–37
Pts: Kyle Filipowski, 22; Rebs: Mark Mitchell, 5 Asts: Tyrese Proctor, 10	Pts: Nike Sabande, 17; Rebs: Guilermo Diaz Graham, 8 Asts: Tied, 3

Greensboro Coliseum
Greensboro, NC
Attendance: 13,920
Referees: Ron Groover, Jamie Luckie, Tommy Morrissey

ESPN

March 9
7:00 p.m.

Report

No. 2 Virginia 68, No. 7 North Carolina 59
Scoring by half: 25–24, 43–35
Pts: Jayden Gardner, 17; Rebs: Jayden Gardner, 10; Asts: Reece Beekman, 5	Pts: R. J. Davis, 24; Rebs: Leaky Black, 9 Asts: Caleb Love, 6

Greensboro Coliseum
Greensboro, NC
Referees: Clarence Armstrong, Mark Schnur, Bert Smith

ESPN

March 9
9:30 p.m.

Report

No. 3 Clemson 80, No. 6 NC State 54
Scoring by half: 39–36, 41–18
Pts: Tied, 15; Rebs: Hunter Tyson, 12; Asts: Chase Hunter, 9	Pts: D. J. Burns, 12; Rebs: Jack Clark, 7 Asts: Tied, 3

Greensboro Coliseum
Greensboro, NC
Attendance: 17,722
Referees: Roger Ayers, AJ Desai, Ted Valentine

=== Semifinals ===
ESPN2

March 10
7:00 p.m.

Report

No. 1 Miami 78, No. 4 Duke 85
Scoring by half: 36–41, 42–44
Pts: Isaiah Wong, 22; Rebs: Jordan Miller, 7 Asts: Wooga Poplar, 4	Pts: Kyle Filipowski, 17; Rebs: Kyle Filiposwski, 11; Asts: Tied, 5

Greensboro Coliseum
Greensboro, NC
Referees: Clarence Armstrong, A.J. Desai, Ted Valentine

ESPN2

March 10
9:30 p.m.

Report

No. 2 Virginia 76, No. 3 Clemson 56
Scoring by half: 37–25, 39–31
Pts: Jayden Gardner, 23; Rebs: Jayden Gardner, 12; Asts: Reece Beekman, 7	Pts: Hunter Tyson, 15; Rebs: PJ Hall, 10; Asts: Tied, 2

Greensboro Coliseum
Greensboro, NC
Attendance: 15,316
Referees: Lee Cassell, Ron Groover, Jamie Luckie

=== Final ===
ESPN

March 11
8:30 p.m.

Report

No. 2 Virginia 49, No. 4 Duke 59
Scoring by half: 17-24, 32-35
Pts: Reece Beekman, 12; Rebs: Kadin Shedrick, 7 Asts: Reece Beekman, 4	Pts: Jeremy Roach, 23; Rebs: Kyle Filipowski, 10; Asts: Tied, 3

Greensboro Coliseum
Greensboro, NC
Attendance: 19,116
Referees: Bert Smith, Bill Covington, Roger Ayers

== Awards and honors ==
2023 ACC Men's Basketball All-Tournament Teams
First Team	Second Team
Kyle Filipowski, Duke (MVP); Jeremy Roach, Duke; Jayden Gardner, Virginia; Isaiah Wong, Miami; Terquavion Smith, NC State	Dereck Lively II, Duke; Armaan Franklin, Virginia; Reece Beekman, Virginia; Jordan Miller, Miami; R. J. Davis, North Carolina

== See also ==
- 2023 ACC women's basketball tournament
