= 2022–23 Georgia Tech Yellow Jackets men's basketball team =

American college basketball season

2022–23 Georgia Tech Yellow Jackets men's basketball
- Conference: Atlantic Coast Conference
- Record: 15–18 (6–14 ACC)
- Head coach: Josh Pastner (7th season)
- Associate head coach: Anthony Wilkins
- Assistant coaches: Julian Swartz; Brian Eskildsen
- Home arena: McCamish Pavilion

2022–23 ACC men's basketball standings
	Conf.				Overall
Team	W		L	PCT	W		L	PCT
No. 16 Miami (FL)	15	–	5	.750	29	–	8	.784
No. 14 Virginia	15	–	5	.750	25	–	8	.758
Clemson	14	–	6	.700	23	–	11	.676
No. 12 Duke †	14	–	6	.700	27	–	9	.750
Pittsburgh	14	–	6	.700	24	–	12	.667
NC State	12	–	8	.600	23	–	11	.676
North Carolina	11	–	9	.550	20	–	13	.606
Wake Forest	10	–	10	.500	19	–	14	.576
Syracuse	10	–	10	.500	17	–	15	.531
Boston College	9	–	11	.450	16	–	17	.485
Virginia Tech	8	–	12	.400	19	–	15	.559
Florida State	7	–	13	.350	9	–	23	.281
Georgia Tech	6	–	14	.300	15	–	18	.455
Notre Dame	3	–	17	.150	11	–	21	.344
Louisville	2	–	18	.100	4	–	28	.125
† 2023 ACC tournament winner Rankings from AP poll

The 2022–23 Georgia Tech Yellow Jackets men's basketball team represented the Georgia Institute of Technology during the 2022–23 NCAA Division I men's basketball season. They were led by seventh-year head coach Josh Pastner and played their home games at Hank McCamish Pavilion as members of the Atlantic Coast Conference. They finished the season 15–18, 6–14 in ACC play to finish in 13thplace. In the ACC tournament, they defeated Florida State before losing to Pittsburgh in the second round. They were not invited to the NCAA tournament or the NIT

On March 10, 2023, the school fired head coach Josh Pastner. Three days later, the school named former Pacific head coach Damon Stoudamire as the team's new head coach.

== Previous season ==
The Yellow Jackets finished the 2021–22 season 12–20, 5–15 in ACC play to finish in 14th place. In the ACC tournament, they lost to Louisville in the first round.

== Offseason ==
=== Departures ===
Departures
Name	Number	Pos.	Height	Weight	Year	Hometown	Reason for departure
Michael Devoe	0	G	6'5"	191	Senior	Orlando, FL	Graduated/undrafted in 2022 NBA draft
Saba Gigiberia	2	C	7'1"	248	Sophomore	Tbilisi, Georgia	Transferred to San Francisco
Bubba Parham	3	G	5'10"	161	GS Senior	Snellville, GA	Graduate and transferred to Samford
Jordan Usher	4	G/F	6'7"	220	GS Senior	Canton, GA	Graduated
Khalid Moore	12	F	6'7"	208	Senior	Briarwood, NY	Graduated and transferred to Fordham
Jehloni James	35	F	6'6"	192	Junior	Sugar Hill, GA	Walk-on; transferred

=== Incoming transfers ===
Incoming transfers
Name	Number	Pos.	Height	Weight	Year	Hometown	Previous school
Lance Terry	0	G	6'2"	180	Senior	College Park, GA	Gardner–Webb
Javon Franklin	4	F	6'7"	220	GS Senior	Little Rock, AR	South Alabama

=== Recruiting classes ===
==== 2022 recruiting class ====
College recruiting information
Name	Hometown	School	Height	Weight	Commit date
Freds Bagatskis; SF	Latvia	N/A	6 ft 9 in (2.06 m)	190 lb (86 kg)	Jun 7, 2022
Freds Bagatskis; SF	Recruit ratings: Scout: Rivals: 247Sports: ESPN: (NR)				
Cyril Martynov; PF	Lawrenceville, NJ	The Lawrenceville School	6 ft 11 in (2.11 m)	230 lb (100 kg)	Aug 4, 2022
Cyril Martynov; PF	Recruit ratings: Scout: Rivals: 247Sports: ESPN: (NR)				
Overall recruit ranking:
Note: In many cases, Scout, Rivals, 247Sports, On3, and ESPN may conflict in their listings of height and weight.; In these cases, the average was taken. ESPN grades are on a 100-point scale.; Sources: "2022 Georgia Tech Commits". Rivals.; "Georgia Tech 2022 Basketball Commits". Scout.; "Georgia Tech Yellow Jackets". ESPN.; "Scout.com Team Recruiting Rankings". Scout.; "2022 Team Ranking". Rivals.

==== 2023 recruiting class ====
College recruiting information (2023)
Name	Hometown	School	Height	Weight	Commit date
Blue Cain; SG	Knoxville, TN	Knoxville Catholic School	6 ft 4 in (1.93 m)	180 lb (82 kg)	Jun 9, 2022
Blue Cain; SG	Recruit ratings: Scout: Rivals: 247Sports: ESPN: (NR)				
Overall recruit ranking:
Note: In many cases, Scout, Rivals, 247Sports, On3, and ESPN may conflict in their listings of height and weight.; In these cases, the average was taken. ESPN grades are on a 100-point scale.; Sources: "2023 Georgia Tech Commits". Rivals.; "Georgia Tech 2023 Basketball Commits". Scout.; "Georgia Tech Yellow Jackets". ESPN.; "Scout.com Team Recruiting Rankings". Scout.; "2023 Team Ranking". Rivals.

== Roster ==
2022–23 Georgia Tech Yellow Jackets men's basketball team
Players
Coaches

Pos.	#	Name	Height	Weight	Year	Previous school	Hometown
G	0	Lance Terry	6 ft 2 in (1.88 m)	180 lb (82 kg)	Sr	The Heritage School; Gardner–Webb	College Park, GA
G	1	Kyle Sturdivant	6 ft 2 in (1.88 m)	197 lb (89 kg)	Sr	Norcross HS; Southern California	Norcross, GA
G	3	Dallan Coleman	6 ft 6 in (1.98 m)	215 lb (98 kg)	So	West Nassau HS	Memphis, TN
F	4	Javon Franklin	6 ft 7 in (2.01 m)	220 lb (100 kg)	GS	Parkview Magnet HS; Auburn	Little Rock, AR
G	5	Deivon Smith	6 ft 1 in (1.85 m)	172 lb (78 kg)	Jr	Grayson HS; Mississippi State	Loganville, GA
F	10	Cyril Martynov	6 ft 11 in (2.11 m)	230 lb (104 kg)	Fr	Lawrenceville School	Barrie, ON
G	11	Tristan Maxwell	6 ft 2 in (1.88 m)	209 lb (95 kg)	Jr	North Mecklenburg HS	Huntersville, NC
F	12	Freds Bagatskis	6 ft 8 in (2.03 m)	200 lb (91 kg)	Fr	Valencia Basket	Riga, Latvia
G	13	Miles Kelly	6 ft 5 in (1.96 m)	171 lb (78 kg)	So	Parkview HS	Lilburn, GA
F	14	Jalon Moore	6 ft 6 in (1.98 m)	211 lb (96 kg)	So	Gardendale HS	Gardendale, AL
F	23	Jordan Meka	6 ft 8 in (2.03 m)	225 lb (102 kg)	Jr	Mount Bethel Christian Academy	Yaoundé, Cameroon
C	24	Rodney Howard	6 ft 10 in (2.08 m)	246 lb (112 kg)	Sr	Legacy Charter School; Georgia	Ypsilanti, MI
G	30	Coleman Boyd (W)	6 ft 1 in (1.85 m)	178 lb (81 kg)	Sr	Mount Bethel Christian Academy	Smyrna, GA
G	33	Brayden Daniels (W)	6 ft 4 in (1.93 m)	176 lb (80 kg)	So	Christian Academy	Louisville, KY
F	43	Jermontae Hill (W)	6 ft 6 in (1.98 m)	198 lb (90 kg)	RS Fr	DME Academy	Tucker, GA
F		Emmer Nichols (W)	6 ft 6 in (1.98 m)	220 lb (100 kg)	Fr	Sacred Heart Prep School	Woodside, CA

Head coach

- Josh Pastner (Arizona)

Assistant coach(es)

- Anthony Wilkins (Kent State)
- Julian Swartz (Carroll)
- Brian Eskildsen (Tennessee)

Legend

- (C) Team captain
- (S) Suspended
- (I) Ineligible
- (W) Walk-on
- Injured
- Current redshirt

Roster

== Schedule and results ==
Date time, TV	Rank^{#}	Opponent^{#}	Result	Record	High points	High rebounds	High assists	Site (attendance) city, state
Regular season
November 7, 2022*; 7:30 p.m., ACCNX/ESPN+		Clayton State	W 93–63	1–0	16 – Terry	13 – Howard	5 – Sturdivant	McCamish Pavilion (3,072); Atlanta, GA
November 12, 2022*; 7:00 p.m., ESPN+		at Georgia State	W 59–57	2–0	16 – Coleman	7 – Moore	3 – Howard	GSU Convocation Center (4,083); Atlanta, GA
November 17, 2022*; 8:00 p.m., ACCN		Northern Illinois; Fort Myers Tip-Off campus site game	W 68–50	3–0	14 – Franklin	11 – Franklin	11 – Smith	McCamish Pavilion (3,269); Atlanta, GA
November 21, 2022*; 6:00 p.m., FS1		vs. Utah; Fort Myers Tip-Off semifinals	L 64–68	3–1	15 – Smith	8 – Franklin	4 – Smith	Suncoast Credit Union Arena (1,188); Fort Myers, FL
November 23, 2022*; 6:00 p.m., FS1		vs. Marquette; Fort Myers Tip-Off consolation	L 60–84	3–2	17 – Franklin	14 – Franklin	2 – Tied	Suncoast Credit Union Arena (1,691); Fort Myers, FL
November 26, 2022*; 4:00 p.m., ACCNX/ESPN+		North Alabama	W 80–61	4–2	16 – Smith	8 – Moore	4 – Smith	McCamish Pavilion (3,379); Atlanta, GA
November 29, 2022*; 9:00 p.m., ESPN2		at Iowa; ACC–Big Ten Challenge	L 65–81	4–3	21 – Kelly	8 – Tied	4 – Tied	Carver–Hawkeye Arena (10,450); Iowa City, IA
December 2, 2022*; 7:30 p.m., ACCNX/ESPN+		Northeastern	W 81–63	5–3	16 – Tied	9 – Moore	3 – Tied	McCamish Pavilion (3,494); Atlanta, GA
December 6, 2022*; 7:00 p.m., ESPN2		Georgia; Clean Old-Fashioned Hate	W 79–77	6–3	17 – Kelly	9 – Franklin	6 – Smith	McCamish Pavilion (5,810); Atlanta, GA
December 10, 2022; 3:15 p.m., ESPN		at North Carolina	L 59–75	6–4 (0–1)	15 – Tied	5 – Moore	3 – Tied	Dean Smith Center (19,410); Chapel Hill, NC
December 17, 2022*; 2:00 p.m., ACCNX/ESPN+		Alabama State	W 96–60	7–4	18 – Maxwell	11 – Howard	7 – Sturdivant	McCamish Pavilion (3,793); Atlanta, GA
December 21, 2022; 7:30 p.m., ESPN2		Clemson	L 66–79	7–5 (0–2)	17 – Kelly	9 – Moore	4 – Moore	McCamish Pavilion (4,763); Atlanta, GA
December 31, 2022; 12:00 p.m., ACCN		No. 13 Virginia	L 56–74	7–6 (0–3)	20 – Kelly	5 – Howard	8 – Sturdivant	McCamish Pavilion (5,371); Atlanta, GA
January 4, 2023; 7:00 p.m., ACCRSN		No. 12 Miami (FL)	W 76–70	8–6 (1–3)	24 – Terry	8 – Howard	5 – Smith	McCamish Pavilion (4,203); Atlanta, GA
January 7, 2023; 1:00 p.m., ACCRSN		at Florida State	L 64–75	8–7 (1–4)	17 – Terry	7 – Smith	6 – Smith	Donald L. Tucker Civic Center (5,536); Tallahassee, FL
January 10, 2023; 7:00 p.m., ACCN		at Notre Dame	L 72–73 ^{OT}	8–8 (1–5)	18 – Sturdivant	12 – Franklin	7 – Smith	Joyce Center (4,502); South Bend, IN
January 14, 2023; 3:00 p.m., ACCN		Pittsburgh	L 60–71	8–9 (1–6)	15 – Smith	11 – Smith	5 – Strudivant	McCamish Pavilion (5,325); Atlanta, GA
January 17, 2023; 7:00 p.m., ACCN		NC State	L 66–78	8–10 (1–7)	17 – Moore	8 – Moore	5 – Howard	McCamish Pavilion (4,242); Atlanta, GA
January 21, 2023; 12:00 p.m., ACCRSN		Syracuse	L 63–80	8–11 (1–8)	17 – Coleman	5 – Moore	7 – Smith	McCamish Pavilion (5,566); Atlanta, GA
January 24, 2023; 9:00 p.m., ACCN		at No. 24 Clemson	L 51–72	8–12 (1–9)	12 – Franklin	10 – Smith	5 – Sturdivant	Littlejohn Coliseum (6,923); Clemson, SC
January 28, 2023; 3:00 p.m., ACCN		Duke	L 43–86	8–13 (1–10)	10 – Maxwell	6 – Howard	5 – Smith	McCamish Pavilion (7,382); Atlanta, GA
February 1, 2023; 7:00 p.m., ACCRSN		at Louisville	L 58–68	8–14 (1–11)	17 – Sturdivant	12 – Franklin	4 – Sturdivant	KFC Yum! Center (11,416); Louisville, KY
February 4, 2023; 1:00 p.m., ACCN		at NC State	L 64–72	8–15 (1–12)	17 – Kelly	9 – Kelly	5 – Franklin	PNC Arena (15,473); Raleigh, NC
February 8, 2023; 7:00 p.m., ACCRSN		Notre Dame	W 70–68	9–15 (2–12)	19 – Terry	9 – Tied	7 – Smith	McCamish Pavilion (4,906); Atlanta, GA
February 11, 2023; 5:00 p.m., ACCN		at Wake Forest	L 70–71	9–16 (2–13)	15 – Smith	15 – Franklin	5 – Smith	LJVM Coliseum (8,566); Winston-Salem, NC
February 15, 2023; 7:00 p.m., ACCN		Virginia Tech	W 77–70	10–16 (3–13)	21 – Coleman	10 – Franklin	3 – Tied	McCamish Pavilion (4,565); Atlanta, GA
February 18, 2023*; 2:00 p.m., ACCNX/ESPN+		Florida Tech	W 79–56	11–16	19 – Terry	14 – Franklin	5 – Tied	McCamish Pavilion (4,890); Atlanta, GA
February 21, 2023; 7:00 p.m., ACCN		at Pittsburgh	L 68–76	11–17 (3–14)	24 – Kelly	8 – Franklin	5 – Sturdivant	Peterson Events Center (9,482); Pittsburgh, PA
February 25, 2023; 2:00 p.m., ACCRSN		Louisville	W 83–67	12–17 (4–14)	21 – Franklin	13 – Franklin	10 – Sturdivant	McCamish Pavilion (6,070); Atlanta, GA
February 28, 2023; 7:00 p.m., ACCRSN		at Syracuse	W 96–76	13–17 (5–14)	30 – Kelly	15 – Franklin	10 – Franklin	JMA Wireless Dome (18,522); Syracuse, NY
March 4, 2023; 2:30 p.m., ESPNU		at Boston College	W 73–65	14–17 (6–14)	21 – Kelly	15 – Franklin	4 – Sturdivant	Conte Forum (6,554); Chestnut Hill, MA
ACC tournament
March 7, 2023; 2:00 p.m., ACCN	(13)	vs. (12) Florida State; First round	W 61–60	15–17	21 – Kelly	19 – Franklin	7 – Sturdivant	Greensboro Coliseum (7,231); Greensboro, NC
March 8, 2023; 2:30 p.m., ESPN	(13)	vs. (5) Pittsburgh; Second round	L 81–89	15–18	19 – Franklin	15 – Franklin	8 – Sturdivant	Greensboro Coliseum (17,685); Greensboro, NC
*Non-conference game. ^{#}Rankings from AP Poll. (#) Tournament seedings in parentheses. All times are in Eastern Time.
