= 2022–23 Boston College Eagles men's basketball team =

American college basketball season

2022–23 Boston College Eagles men's basketball
- Conference: Atlantic Coast Conference
- Record: 16–17 (9–11 ACC)
- Head coach: Earl Grant (2nd season)
- Assistant coaches: Anthony Goins; Corey McCrae; Jim Molinari
- Home arena: Conte Forum

2022–23 ACC men's basketball standings
	Conf.				Overall
Team	W		L	PCT	W		L	PCT
No. 16 Miami (FL)	15	–	5	.750	29	–	8	.784
No. 14 Virginia	15	–	5	.750	25	–	8	.758
Clemson	14	–	6	.700	23	–	11	.676
No. 12 Duke †	14	–	6	.700	27	–	9	.750
Pittsburgh	14	–	6	.700	24	–	12	.667
NC State	12	–	8	.600	23	–	11	.676
North Carolina	11	–	9	.550	20	–	13	.606
Wake Forest	10	–	10	.500	19	–	14	.576
Syracuse	10	–	10	.500	17	–	15	.531
Boston College	9	–	11	.450	16	–	17	.485
Virginia Tech	8	–	12	.400	19	–	15	.559
Florida State	7	–	13	.350	9	–	23	.281
Georgia Tech	6	–	14	.300	15	–	18	.455
Notre Dame	3	–	17	.150	11	–	21	.344
Louisville	2	–	18	.100	4	–	28	.125
† 2023 ACC tournament winner Rankings from AP poll

The 2022–23 Boston College Eagles men's basketball team represented Boston College during the 2022–23 NCAA Division I men's basketball season. The Eagles, were led by second-year head coach Earl Grant, played their home games at the Conte Forum as members of the Atlantic Coast Conference. They finished the season 16–17, 9–11 in ACC play to finish in 10thplace. In the ACC tournament, they defeated Louisville before losing to North Carolina in the second round.

== Previous season ==
The Eagles finished the 2021–22 season 13–20, 6–14 in ACC play to finish in a three-way tie for eleventh place. As the thirteenth seed in the ACC tournament, they defeated twelfth seed Pittsburgh in the first round and fifth seed Wake Forest in the second round before losing to fourth seed Miami in the quarterfinals.

== Offseason ==
=== Departures ===
Departures
Name	Number	Pos.	Height	Weight	Year	Hometown	Reason for departure
Kanye Jones	4	G	6'4"	170	Freshman	Orlando, FL	Transferred to Buffalo
Frederick Scott	13	F	6'8"	230	GS Senior	Muster, IN	Graduated
Gianni Thompson	24	F	6'8"	205	Freshman	Newton, MA	Transferred to Massachusetts
Justin Vander Baan	32	C	7'0"	230	Sophomore	Northbridge, MA	Transferred to Lafayette
James Karnik	33	F	6'9"	230	RS Senior	Surrey, BC	Graduated
Brevin Galloway	51	G	6'2"	200	GS Senior	Anderson, SC	Graduated & transferred to Clemson

=== Incoming transfers ===
Boston College incoming transfers
Name	Number	Pos.	Height	Weight	Year	Hometown	Previous school
C. J. Penha	24	F	6'7"	220	GS Senior	Pickerington, OH	Trevecca Nazarene
Mason Madsen	45	G	6'4"	200	Sophomore	Rochester, MN	Cincinnati

=== 2022 recruiting class ===
College recruiting information
Name	Hometown	School	Height	Weight	Commit date
Prince Aligbe #26 SF	Minneapolis, MN	Minnehaha Academy	6 ft 6 in (1.98 m)	215 lb (98 kg)	Oct 1, 2021
Prince Aligbe #26 SF	Recruit ratings: Scout: Rivals: 247Sports: ESPN: (81)				
Donald Hand Jr. #36 SG	Virginia Beach, VA	Landstown High School	6 ft 4 in (1.93 m)	180 lb (82 kg)	Sep 7, 2021
Donald Hand Jr. #36 SG	Recruit ratings: Scout: Rivals: 247Sports: ESPN: (80)				
Chas Kelley #39 SG	Malvern, PA	The Phelps School	6 ft 4 in (1.93 m)	180 lb (82 kg)	Sep 12, 2021
Chas Kelley #39 SG	Recruit ratings: Scout: Rivals: 247Sports: ESPN: (80)				
Armani Mighty; C	Toronto, ON	United Faith Christian Academy	6 ft 10 in (2.08 m)	220 lb (100 kg)	Oct 6, 2021
Armani Mighty; C	Recruit ratings: Scout: Rivals: 247Sports: ESPN: (NR)				
Overall recruit ranking:
Note: In many cases, Scout, Rivals, 247Sports, On3, and ESPN may conflict in their listings of height and weight.; In these cases, the average was taken. ESPN grades are on a 100-point scale.; Sources: "Boston College Eagles". Rivals.; "Boston College 2022 Basketball Commits". Scout.; "Boston College Eagles". ESPN.; "Scout.com Team Recruiting Rankings". Scout.; "2022 Team Ranking". Rivals.

=== 2023 Recruiting class ===
College recruiting information (2023)
Name	Hometown	School	Height	Weight	Commit date
Fred Payne #31 PG	Spring, TX	Legacy The School of Sport Sciences	6 ft 3 in (1.91 m)	170 lb (77 kg)	May 24, 2022
Fred Payne #31 PG	Recruit ratings: Scout: Rivals: 247Sports: ESPN: (78)				
Overall recruit ranking:
Note: In many cases, Scout, Rivals, 247Sports, On3, and ESPN may conflict in their listings of height and weight.; In these cases, the average was taken. ESPN grades are on a 100-point scale.; Sources: "Boston College Eagles". Rivals.; "Boston College 2023 Basketball Commits". Scout.; "Boston College Eagles". ESPN.; "Scout.com Team Recruiting Rankings". Scout.; "2023 Team Ranking". Rivals.

== Roster ==
2022–23 Boston College Eagles men's basketball team
Players
Coaches

Pos.	#	Name	Height	Weight	Year	Previous school	Hometown
G	00	Chas Kelley	6 ft 5 in (1.96 m)	185 lb (84 kg)	Fr	The Phelps School	Houston, Texas
F	1	T. J. Bickerstaff	6 ft 9 in (2.06 m)	220 lb (100 kg)	Sr	Sandy Creek	Atlanta, Georgia
C	2	Armani Mighty	6 ft 10 in (2.08 m)	220 lb (100 kg)	Fr	United Scholastic Academy	Toronto, Ontario
G	3	Jaeden Zackery	6 ft 2 in (1.88 m)	210 lb (95 kg)	So	Chipola College	Salem, Wisconsin
G	4	Abe Atiyeh (W)	6 ft 0 in (1.83 m)	195 lb (88 kg)	Jr	Moravian Academy	Bethlehem, Pennsylvania
G	5	DeMarr Langford Jr.	6 ft 5 in (1.96 m)	210 lb (95 kg)	Jr	Brewster Academy	Worcester, Massachusetts
G/F	10	Prince Aligbe	6 ft 6 in (1.98 m)	215 lb (98 kg)	Fr	Minnehaha Academy	Minneapolis, Minnesota
G	11	Makai Ashton-Langford	6 ft 3 in (1.91 m)	185 lb (84 kg)	GS	Providence	Worcester, Massachusetts
F	12	Quinten Post	7 ft 0 in (2.13 m)	240 lb (109 kg)	Sr	Mississippi State	Amsterdam, Netherlands
G	13	Donald Hand Jr.	6 ft 5 in (1.96 m)	185 lb (84 kg)	Fr	Landstown	Virginia Beach, Virginia
F	21	Devin McGlockton	6 ft 7 in (2.01 m)	215 lb (98 kg)	So	South Forsyth	Cumming, Georgia
F	23	Andrew Kenny (W)	6 ft 6 in (1.98 m)	200 lb (91 kg)	Sr	Choate Rosemary Hall	Seattle, Washington
F	24	CJ Penha Jr.	6 ft 7 in (2.01 m)	220 lb (100 kg)	GS	Trevecca Nazarene	Pickerington, Ohio
G	25	Jonathan Noel (W)	6 ft 3 in (1.91 m)	205 lb (93 kg)	Sr	St. Mark's School	Everett, Massachusetts
G	30	Quinn Pemberton (W)	6 ft 1 in (1.85 m)	210 lb (95 kg)	Jr	Loyola Academy	Lake Forest, Illinois
G	45	Mason Madsen	6 ft 4 in (1.93 m)	200 lb (91 kg)	Jr	Cincinnati	Rochester, Minnesota

Head coach

- Earl Grant (Georgia College)

Assistant coach(es)

- Anthony Goins (St. John's)
- Corey McCrae (Wagner)
- Jim Molinari (Illinois Wesleyan)

Legend

- (C) Team captain
- (S) Suspended
- (I) Ineligible
- (W) Walk-on
- Injured
- Current redshirt

Roster
Last update: July 28, 2022

== Schedule and results ==
Date time, TV	Rank^{#}	Opponent^{#}	Result	Record	High points	High rebounds	High assists	Site (attendance) city, state
Regular season
November 7, 2022*; 8:00 p.m., ACCNX/ESPN+		Cornell	W 79–77	1–0	16 – Aligbe	10 – Bickerstaff	7 – Zackery	Conte Forum (4,239); Chestnut Hill, MA
November 11, 2022*; 1:00 p.m., ACCNX/ESPN+		Detroit Mercy	W 70–66	2–0	18 – Madsen	11 – Bickerstaff	3 – Ashton-Langford	Conte Forum (4,830); Chestnut Hill, MA
November 14, 2022*; 6:00 p.m., ACCN		Maine	L 64–69	2–1	18 – Ashton-Langford	10 – Bickerstaff	4 – Bickerstaff	Conte Forum (3,811); Chestnut Hill, MA
November 18, 2022*; 8:00 p.m., ESPN3		vs. George Mason; Paradise Jam quarterfinals	W 71–56	3–1	17 – Ashton-Langford	9 – McGlockton	3 – Ashton-Langford	Sports and Fitness Center (924); Saint Thomas, USVI
November 20, 2022*; 8:00 p.m., ESPN3		vs. Tarleton State; Paradise Jam semifinals	L 54–70	3–2	12 – Penha	5 – Tied	2 – Ashton-Langford	Sports and Fitness Center (1,224); Saint Thomas, USVI
November 21, 2022*; 5:45 p.m., ESPN3		vs. Wyoming; Paradise Jam 3rd place game	W 59–48	4–2	16 – Zackery	6 – Penha	2 – Madsen	Sports and Fitness Center; Saint Thomas, USVI
November 27, 2022*; 12:00 p.m., ACCN		Rhode Island	W 53–49	5–2	16 – Zackery	10 – Bickerstaff	4 – Ashton-Langford	Conte Forum (4,432); Chestnut Hill, MA
November 30, 2022*; 9:15 p.m., ESPNU		at Nebraska; ACC–Big Ten Challenge	L 67–88	5–3	20 – McGlockton	11 – McGlockton	4 – Langford	Pinnacle Bank Arena (13,080); Lincoln, NE
December 3, 2022; 4:00 p.m., ACCN		at No. 17 Duke	L 59–75	5–4 (0–1)	16 – Penha Jr.	7 – Tied	2 – Tied	Cameron Indoor Stadium (9,314); Durham, NC
December 6, 2022*; 7:00 p.m., ACCNX/ESPN+		New Hampshire	L 71–74 ^{OT}	5–5	14 – Zackery	10 – Bickerstaff	2 – Tied	Conte Forum (3,259); Chestnut Hill, MA
December 10, 2022*; 5:00 p.m., FOX		vs. Villanova; Never Forget Tribute Classic	L 56–77	5–6	13 – Tied	9 – Bickerstaff	4 – Madsen	Prudential Center (9,437); Newark, NJ
December 13, 2022*; 7:00 p.m., ACCNX/ESPN+		Stonehill	W 63–56	6–6	16 – Zackery	7 – Tied	3 – Zackery	Conte Forum (3,749); Chestnut Hill, MA
December 21, 2022; 6:30 p.m., ACCN		No. 21 Virginia Tech	W 70–65 ^{OT}	7–6 (1–1)	21 – Ashton-Langford	7 – Tied	5 – Zackery	Conte Forum (4,012); Chestnut Hill, MA
December 31, 2022; 2:00 p.m., ACCN		at Syracuse	L 65–79	7–7 (1–2)	14 – Ashton-Langford	5 – Tied	3 – Tied	JMA Wireless Dome (17,693); Syracuse, NY
January 3, 2023; 7:00 p.m., ACCN		Notre Dame	W 70–63	8–7 (2–2)	18 – Zackery	7 – Tied	8 – Langford	Conte Forum (4,194); Chestnut Hill, MA
January 7, 2023; 1:00 p.m., ACCN		No. 16 Duke	L 64–65	8–8 (2–3)	16 – Post	8 – Langford	4 – Zackery	Conte Forum (8,606); Chestnut Hill, MA
January 11, 2023; 7:00 p.m., ESPNU		at No. 16 Miami (FL)	L 72–88	8–9 (2–4)	20 – Langford Jr.	6 – Bickerstaff	6 – Langford Jr.	Watsco Center (4,353); Coral Gables, FL
January 14, 2023; 8:00 p.m., ESPN2		Wake Forest	L 63–85	8–10 (2–5)	14 – Zackery	7 – McGlockton	3 – Tied	Conte Forum (4,655); Chestnut Hill, MA
January 17, 2023; 7:00 p.m., ACCRSN		at North Carolina	L 64–72	8–11 (2–6)	17 – Post	5 – Post	1 – Tied	Dean Smith Center (19,121); Chapel Hill, NC
January 21, 2023; 2:00 p.m., ACCRSN		at Notre Dame	W 84–72	9–11 (3–6)	29 – Post	14 – Post	7 – Ashton-Langford	Joyce Center (6,068); South Bend, IN
January 25, 2023; 9:00 p.m., ACCN		Louisville	W 75–65	10–11 (4–6)	22 – Post	6 – Tied	7 – Zackery	Conte Forum (5,688); Chestnut Hill, MA
January 28, 2023; 12:00 p.m., ACCRSN		at No. 7 Virginia	L 57–67	10–12 (4–7)	24 – Post	6 – Post	6 – Zackery	John Paul Jones Arena (14,629); Charlottesville, VA
January 31, 2023; 7:00 p.m., ACCN		No. 20 Clemson	W 62–54	11–12 (5–7)	15 – Ashton-Langford	7 – Tied	4 – Post	Conte Forum (5,298); Chestnut Hill, MA
February 4, 2023; 5:00 p.m., ACCN		Syracuse	L 68–77	11–13 (5–8)	18 – Post	8 – Aligbe	5 – Tied	Conte Forum (8,606); Chestnut Hill, MA
February 8, 2023; 7:00 p.m., ACCN		at Virginia Tech	W 82–76	12–13 (6–8)	24 – Post	10 – Post	12 – Ashton-Langford	Cassell Coliseum (8,925); Blacksburg, VA
February 11, 2023; 12:00 p.m., ACCRSN		No. 22 NC State	L 62–92	12–14 (6–9)	20 – Post	7 – Madsen	3 – Ashton-Langford	Conte Forum (6,764); Chestnut Hill, MA
February 14, 2023; 9:00 p.m., ACCN		at Pittsburgh	L 58–77	12–15 (6–10)	14 – Madsen	6 – Tied	4 – Kelley III	Peterson Events Center (6,746); Pittsburgh, PA
February 18, 2023; 12:00 p.m., ACCRSN		at Florida State	W 75–69	13–15 (7–10)	21 – Post	7 – Tied	5 – Zackery	Donald L. Tucker Civic Center (6,025); Tallahassee, FL
February 22, 2023; 7:00 p.m., ACCRSN		No. 6 Virginia	W 63–48	14–15 (8–10)	16 – Ashton-Langford	7 – Aligbe	4 – Tied	Conte Forum (8,194); Chestnut Hill, MA
February 28, 2023; 7:00 p.m., ESPNU		at Wake Forest	W 71–69	15–15 (9–10)	19 – Post	6 – Aligbe	5 – Ashton-Langford	LJVM Coliseum (7,406); Winston-Salem, NC
March 4, 2023; 2:30 p.m., ESPNU		Georgia Tech	L 65–73	15–16 (9–11)	15 – Bickerstaff	9 – Bickerstaff	4 – Bickerstaff	Conte Forum (6,554); Chestnut Hill, MA
ACC tournament
March 7, 2023; 4:30 p.m., ACCN	(10)	vs. (15) Louisville; First round	W 80–62	16–16	16 – Ashton-Langford	7 – Bickerstaff	8 – Zackery	Greensboro Coliseum (7,231); Greensboro, NC
March 8, 2023; 7:00 p.m., ESPN2	(10)	vs. (7) North Carolina; Second round	L 61–85	16–17	16 – Ashton-Langford	5 – Post	3 – Ashton-Langford	Greensboro Coliseum (17,685); Greensboro, NC
*Non-conference game. ^{#}Rankings from AP Poll. (#) Tournament seedings in parentheses. All times are in Eastern Time.

== Rankings ==
Ranking movements Legend: — = Not ranked
	Week																			
Poll	Pre	1	2	3	4	5	6	7	8	9	10	11	12	13	14	15	16	17	18	Final
AP	—	—	—	—	—	—	—	—	—	—	—	—	—	—	—	—	—	—	—	Not released
Coaches	—	—	—	—	—	—	—	—	—	—	—	—	—	—	—	—	—	—	—	—

*AP does not release post-NCAA tournament rankings and the Coaches poll did not release a Week 1 poll.
