= 2022–23 Clemson Tigers men's basketball team =

American college basketball season

2022–23 Clemson Tigers men's basketball

NIT, First Round
- Conference: Atlantic Coast Conference
- Record: 23–11 (14–6 ACC)
- Head coach: Brad Brownell (13th season)
- Associate head coach: Billy Donlon (1st season)
- Assistant coaches: Sean Dixon (1st season); Dick Bender (7th season)
- Home arena: Littlejohn Coliseum (Capacity: 9,000)

2022–23 ACC men's basketball standings
	Conf.				Overall
Team	W		L	PCT	W		L	PCT
No. 16 Miami (FL)	15	–	5	.750	29	–	8	.784
No. 14 Virginia	15	–	5	.750	25	–	8	.758
Clemson	14	–	6	.700	23	–	11	.676
No. 12 Duke †	14	–	6	.700	27	–	9	.750
Pittsburgh	14	–	6	.700	24	–	12	.667
NC State	12	–	8	.600	23	–	11	.676
North Carolina	11	–	9	.550	20	–	13	.606
Wake Forest	10	–	10	.500	19	–	14	.576
Syracuse	10	–	10	.500	17	–	15	.531
Boston College	9	–	11	.450	16	–	17	.485
Virginia Tech	8	–	12	.400	19	–	15	.559
Florida State	7	–	13	.350	9	–	23	.281
Georgia Tech	6	–	14	.300	15	–	18	.455
Notre Dame	3	–	17	.150	11	–	21	.344
Louisville	2	–	18	.100	4	–	28	.125
† 2023 ACC tournament winner Rankings from AP poll

The 2022–23 Clemson Tigers men's basketball team represented Clemson University during the 2022–23 NCAA Division I men's basketball season. The Tigers were led by thirteenth-year head coach Brad Brownell and played their home games at Littlejohn Coliseum in Clemson, South Carolina as members of the Atlantic Coast Conference.

Clemson started the season 6–0 in ACC play for the first time since the ACC was created as a conference. Their previous best was in the 1996–97 season when they started 5–0. The Tigers continued their run by defeating Duke but then lost to Wake Forest to end their undefeated run. They won their next two games and were 9–1 at the halfway point of the conference season. This gave the team its best six, seven, eight, nine and ten game starts in conference history. The Tigers would set another program record on February 15, 2023 when they defeated Florida State 94–54 at home. This was the Tigers' largest victory in ACC play, beating the previous record of a 34 point win in 1975.

The Tigers finished the season 23–11 and 14–6 in ACC play to finish in a three-way tie for third place. As the third seed in the ACC tournament, they earned a bye into the Quarterfinals where they defeated sixth seed NC State for the third time during the season. They fell to second seeded Virginia in the Semifinals. They were not selected for the NCAA tournament and were listed as the fourth team out on Selection Sunday. They received a first overall seed in the National Invitation Tournament. Despite being the first seed, and hosting, the Tigers lost to Morehead State in the First Round to end their season.

== Previous season ==
The Tigers finished the 2021–22 season 17–16, 8–12 in ACC play to finish in 10th place. In the ACC tournament, they defeated NC State before losing eventual champions Virginia Tech in the second round. They failed to receive an invitation to the NCAA tournament or the National Invitation Tournament.

== Offseason ==
=== Departures ===
Clemson Departures
Name	Number	Pos.	Height	Weight	Year	Hometown	Reason for departure
Al-Amir Dawes	2	G	6'2"	182	Junior	Newark, NJ	Transferred to Seton Hall
Nick Honor	4	G	5'10"	195	(redshirt) Junior	Orlando, FL	Transferred to Missouri
Parker Fox	11	G/F	6'7"	210	Senior	Reno, NV	Graduated
David Collins	13	G	6'4"	217	GS Senior	Youngstown, OH	Graduated
Naz Bohannon	33	F	6'6"	232	GS Senior	Lorain, OH	Graduated

=== Incoming transfers ===
Clemson incoming transfers
Name	Number	Pos.	Height	Weight	Year	Hometown	Previous school
Brevin Galloway	11	G	6'2"	200	GS Senior	Anderson, SC	Boston College

=== 2022 recruiting class ===
College recruiting information
Name	Hometown	School	Height	Weight	Commit date
Dillon Hunter #21 PG	Atlanta, GA	Sunrise Christian Academy	6 ft 3 in (1.91 m)	175 lb (79 kg)	Apr 19, 2022
Dillon Hunter #21 PG	Recruit ratings: Scout: Rivals: 247Sports: ESPN: (83)				
Chauncey Wiggins #34 PF	Covington, GA	Eastside High School	6 ft 9 in (2.06 m)	190 lb (86 kg)	Sep 24, 2021
Chauncey Wiggins #34 PF	Recruit ratings: Scout: Rivals: 247Sports: ESPN: (82)				
R.J. Godfrey #51 PF	Suwanee, GA	North Gwinnett High School	6 ft 4 in (1.93 m)	180 lb (82 kg)	Nov 10, 2021
R.J. Godfrey #51 PF	Recruit ratings: Scout: Rivals: 247Sports: ESPN: (80)				
Chauncey Gibson; SG	Dallas, TX	Kimball High School	6 ft 6 in (1.98 m)	180 lb (82 kg)	Oct 9, 2021
Chauncey Gibson; SG	Recruit ratings: Scout: Rivals: 247Sports: ESPN: (NR)				
Overall recruit ranking:
Note: In many cases, Scout, Rivals, 247Sports, On3, and ESPN may conflict in their listings of height and weight.; In these cases, the average was taken. ESPN grades are on a 100-point scale.; Sources: "2022 Clemson Basketball Commitment List". Rivals.; "Clemson Tigers". ESPN.; "2022 Team Ranking". Rivals.

=== 2023 recruiting class ===
College recruiting information (2023)
Name	Hometown	School	Height	Weight	Commit date
Asa Thomas #31 PF	Lake Forest, IL	Lake Forest Academy	6 ft 7 in (2.01 m)	190 lb (86 kg)	Jul 14, 2022
Asa Thomas #31 PF	Recruit ratings: Scout: Rivals: 247Sports: ESPN: (78)				
Overall recruit ranking:
Note: In many cases, Scout, Rivals, 247Sports, On3, and ESPN may conflict in their listings of height and weight.; In these cases, the average was taken. ESPN grades are on a 100-point scale.; Sources: "2023 Clemson Basketball Commitment List". Rivals.; "Clemson Tigers". ESPN.; "2023 Team Ranking". Rivals.

== Roster ==
2022–23 Clemson Tigers men's basketball team
Players
Coaches

Pos.	#	Name	Height	Weight	Year	Hometown
G	0	Josh Beadle	6 ft 3 in (1.91 m)	180 lb (82 kg)	RS Fr	Columbia, South Carolina
G	1	Chase Hunter	6 ft 3 in (1.91 m)	204 lb (93 kg)	RS Jr	Atlanta, Georgia
G	2	Dillon Hunter	6 ft 4 in (1.93 m)	180 lb (82 kg)	Fr	Atlanta, Georgia
F	4	Ian Schieffelin	6 ft 7 in (2.01 m)	225 lb (102 kg)	So	Loganville, Georgia
F	5	Hunter Tyson	6 ft 8 in (2.03 m)	215 lb (98 kg)	RS Sr	Monroe, North Carolina
F/C	10	Ben Middlebrooks	6 ft 10 in (2.08 m)	232 lb (105 kg)	So	Fort Lauderdale, Florida
G	11	Brevin Galloway	6 ft 2 in (1.88 m)	215 lb (98 kg)	GS	Anderson, South Carolina
G	12	Alex Hemenway	6 ft 3 in (1.91 m)	195 lb (88 kg)	Sr	Newburgh, Indiana
G	13	Chauncey Gibson	6 ft 5 in (1.96 m)	190 lb (86 kg)	Fr	Dallas, Texas
G	14	Devin Foster (W)	6 ft 2 in (1.88 m)	180 lb (82 kg)	Sr	Canton, Massachusetts
G	15	Jack Nauseef (W)	6 ft 1 in (1.85 m)	160 lb (73 kg)	Sr	Dayton, Ohio
G	20	Matt Kelly (W)	6 ft 1 in (1.85 m)	170 lb (77 kg)	Fr	Charleston, South Carolina
F	21	Chauncey Wiggins	6 ft 9 in (2.06 m)	205 lb (93 kg)	Fr	Covington, Georgia
F	22	RJ Godfrey	6 ft 7 in (2.01 m)	225 lb (102 kg)	Fr	Suwanee, Georgia
C	24	PJ Hall	6 ft 10 in (2.08 m)	240 lb (109 kg)	Jr	Spartanburg, South Carolina
F	32	Daniel Nauseef (W)	6 ft 7 in (2.01 m)	215 lb (98 kg)	So	Dayton, Ohio

Head coach

- Brad Brownell (DePauw)

Assistant coach(es)

- Billy Donlon (UNC Wilmington)
- Sean Dixon (Presbyterian)
- Dick Bender (McDaniel)

Legend

- (C) Team captain
- (S) Suspended
- (I) Ineligible
- (W) Walk-on
- Injured
- Current redshirt

Roster

== Schedule and results ==
Date time, TV	Rank^{#}	Opponent^{#}	Result	Record	High points	High rebounds	High assists	Site (attendance) city, state
Exhibition
November 2, 2022*; 7:00 p.m., ACCNX/ESPN+		Benedict	W 91–45	–	19 – Tyson	8 – Wiggins	4 – D. Hunter	Littlejohn Coliseum; Clemson, SC
Regular season
November 7, 2022*; 7:00 p.m., ACCNX/ESPN+		The Citadel	W 80–69	1–0	23 – C. Hunter	13 – Tyson	7 – C. Hunter	Littlejohn Coliseum (4,768); Clemson, SC
November 11, 2022*; 7:00 p.m., SECN+/ESPN+		at South Carolina; Rivalry	L 58–60	1–1	15 – Hall	5 – Hall	5 – C. Hunter	Colonial Life Arena (13,380); Columbia, SC
November 15, 2022*; 7:00 p.m., ACCNX/ESPN+		USC Upstate	W 81–70	2–1	20 – C. Hunter	12 – Tyson	3 – Tied	Littlejohn Coliseum (5,002); Clemson, SC
November 18, 2022*; 7:00 p.m., ACCNX/ESPN+		Bellarmine	W 76–66	3–1	15 – C. Hunter	10 – Tyson	8 – C. Hunter	Littlejohn Coliseum (6,137); Clemson, SC
November 21, 2022*; 7:00 p.m., ACCNX/ESPN+		Loyola (MD); Emerald Coast Classic campus site game	W 72–41	4–1	14 – Tyson	9 – Tyson	3 – Tied	Littlejohn Coliseum (4,655); Clemson, SC
November 25, 2022*; 7:00 p.m., CBSSN		vs. No. 25 Iowa; Emerald Coast Classic semifinal	L 71–74	4–2	21 – C. Hunter	8 – Tyson	6 – C. Hunter	The Arena at NFSC (1,880); Niceville, FL
November 26, 2022*; 4:00 p.m., FloHoops		vs. California; Emerald Coast Classic 3rd place game	W 67–59	5–2	14 – Tied	8 – Middlebrooks	7 – C. Hunter	The Arena at NFSC (1,100); Niceville, FL
November 29, 2022*; 7:00 p.m., ESPNU		Penn State; ACC–Big Ten Challenge	W 101–94 ^{2OT}	6–2	24 – Tyson	9 – Tyson	5 – C. Hunter	Littlejohn Coliseum (5,861); Clemson, SC
December 2, 2022; 7:00 p.m., ACCRSN		Wake Forest	W 77–57	7–2 (1–0)	21 – Hall	10 – Tyson	4 – C. Hunter	Littlejohn Coliseum (6,599); Clemson, SC
December 7, 2022*; 9:00 p.m., ACCRSN		Towson	W 80–75	8–2	22 – Hall	14 – Tyson	7 – C. Hunter	Littlejohn Coliseum (4,788); Clemson, SC
December 10, 2022*; 7:30 p.m., ACCN		vs. Loyola–Chicago; Holiday Hoopsgiving	L 58–76	8–3	13 – C. Hunter	6 – Tyson	2 – Tied	State Farm Arena (7,798); Atlanta, GA
December 17, 2022*; 7:00 p.m., ACCNX/ESPN+		vs. Richmond; Greenville Classic	W 85–57	9–3	18 – C. Hunter	8 – Tied	3 – Tied	Bon Secours Wellness Arena (4,117); Greenville, SC
December 21, 2022; 7:30 p.m., ESPN2		at Georgia Tech	W 79–66	10–3 (2–0)	25 – Hall	13 – Tyson	5 – Galloway	McCamish Pavilion (4,763); Atlanta, GA
December 30, 2022; 4:00 p.m., ACCN		NC State	W 78–64	11–3 (3–0)	31 – Tyson	15 – Tyson	4 – Hall	Littlejohn Coliseum (5,969); Clemson, SC
January 4, 2023; 9:00 p.m., ESPNU		at Virginia Tech	W 68–65	12–3 (4–0)	13 – Tied	14 – Tyson	4 – Hunter	Cassell Coliseum (7,539); Blacksburg, VA
January 7, 2023; 4:00 p.m., ESPN2		at Pittsburgh	W 75–74	13–3 (5–0)	17 – C. Hunter	10 – Tied	3 – Tied	Peterson Events Center (10,403); Pittsburgh, PA
January 11, 2023; 9:00 p.m., ACCRSN		Louisville	W 83–70	14–3 (6–0)	28 – Tyson	11 – Tyson	4 – C. Hunter	Littlejohn Coliseum (7,789); Clemson, SC
January 14, 2023; 5:00 p.m., ACCN		No. 24 Duke	W 72–64	15–3 (7–0)	26 – Hall	8 – Schieffelin	6 – Schieffelin	Littlejohn Coliseum (9,000); Clemson, SC
January 17, 2023; 9:00 p.m., ACCRSN	No. 19	at Wake Forest	L 77–87	15–4 (7–1)	22 – Hall	14 – Tyson	4 – Galloway	LJVM Coliseum (8,047); Winston-Salem, NC
January 21, 2023; 6:00 p.m., ESPN2	No. 19	Virginia Tech	W 51–50	16–4 (8–1)	20 – Hall	9 – Tyson	3 – Galloway	Littlejohn Coliseum (9,000); Clemson, SC
January 24, 2023; 9:00 p.m., ACCN	No. 24	Georgia Tech	W 72–51	17–4 (9–1)	17 – Hall	8 – Tyson	6 – Schieffelin	Littlejohn Coliseum (6,923); Clemson, SC
January 28, 2023; 5:00 p.m., ACCN	No. 24	at Florida State	W 82–81	18–4 (10–1)	27 – Tyson	10 – Hall	5 – D. Hunter	Donald L. Tucker Civic Center (7,956); Tallahassee, FL
January 31, 2023; 7:00 p.m., ACCN	No. 20	at Boston College	L 54–62	18–5 (10–2)	22 – Tyson	9 – Hall	1 – Tied	Conte Forum (5,298); Chestnut Hill, MA
February 4, 2023; 3:00 p.m., ACCN	No. 20	No. 23 Miami (FL)	L 74–78	18–6 (10–3)	19 – Hall	10 – Tyson	6 – Hunter	Littlejohn Coliseum (9,000); Clemson, SC
February 11, 2023; 2:00 p.m., ESPN2		at North Carolina	L 71–91	18–7 (10–4)	18 – Hall	7 – Tied	4 – C. Hunter	Dean Smith Center (21,750); Chapel Hill, NC
February 15, 2023; 7:00 p.m., ACCRSN		Florida State	W 94–54	19–7 (11–4)	20 – Hall	8 – Tyson	6 – C. Hunter	Littlejohn Coliseum (6,458); Clemson, SC
February 18, 2023; 7:00 p.m., ACCN		at Louisville	L 73–83	19–8 (11–5)	28 – Hall	8 – Hall	6 – C. Hunter	KFC Yum! Center (15,157); Louisville, KY
February 22, 2023; 7:00 p.m., ACCN		Syracuse	W 91–73	20–8 (12–5)	29 – Tyson	10 – Tyson	11 – Hunter	Littlejohn Coliseum (7,149); Clemson, SC
February 25, 2023; 12:00 p.m., ACCRSN		at NC State	W 96–71	21–8 (13–5)	28 – Galloway	11 – Tyson	3 – Tied	PNC Arena (19,500); Raleigh, NC
February 28, 2023; 7:00 p.m., ACCN		at No. 13 Virginia	L 57–64	21–9 (13–6)	19 – Hall	9 – Tied	3 – C. Hunter	John Paul Jones Arena (14,351); Charlottesville, VA
March 4, 2023; 8:00 p.m., ACCN		Notre Dame	W 87–64	22–9 (14–6)	16 – Tied	13 – Tyson	7 – C. Hunter	Littlejohn Coliseum (9,000); Clemson, SC
ACC tournament
March 9, 2023; 9:30 p.m., ESPN	(3)	vs. (6) NC State; Quarterfinals	W 80–54	23–9	15 – Tied	12 – Tyson	9 – C. Hunter	Greensboro Coliseum (17,722); Greensboro, NC
March 10, 2023; 9:30 p.m., ESPN2	(3)	vs. (2) No. 13 Virginia; Semifinals	L 56–76	23–10	15 – Tyson	10 – Hall	2 – Tied	Greensboro Coliseum (15,316); Greensboro, NC
NIT
March 15, 2023; 7:00 p.m., ESPN+	(1)	Morehead State; First round – Clemson bracket	L 64–68	23–11	18 – Hunter	11 – Tyson	5 – Schieffelin	Littlejohn Coliseum (2,697); Clemson, SC
*Non-conference game. ^{#}Rankings from AP Poll. (#) Tournament seedings in parentheses. All times are in Eastern Time.

== Rankings ==
Ranking movements Legend: ██ Increase in ranking ██ Decrease in ranking — = Not ranked RV = Received votes т = Tied with team above or below
	Week																			
Poll	Pre	1	2	3	4	5	6	7	8	9	10	11	12	13	14	15	16	17	18	Final
AP	—	—	—	—	—	—	—	—	—	RV	19	24	20	RV	—	—	RV	—	—	Not released
Coaches	—	—	—	—	—	—	—	—	—	RV	19	23	19	24т	RV	—	RV	—	—	—

== Statistics ==
Player	GP	GS	MPG	FG%	3P%	FT%	RPG	APG	PPG
PJ Hall	33	27	24.6	53.5%	39.8%	78.6%	5.7	1.0	15.3
Hunter Tyson	34	34	34.7	47.9%	40.5%	83.8%	9.6	1.5	15.3
Chase Hunter	31	31	32.1	41.0%	35.6%	81.3%	3.0	4.5	13.8
Brevin Galloway	32	31	29.2	43.7%	32.7%	86.9%	2.4	2.3	11.2
Alex Hemenway	20	12	24.0	50.0%	47.1%	75.0%	1.8	1.1	6.9
Ian Schieffelin	34	22	19.8	51.1%	33.3%	68.8%	4.1	1.9	5.5
RJ Godfrey	33	1	9.4	59.7%	33.3%	65.4%	2.1	0.3	3.2
Ben Middlebrooks	34	7	11.3	48.0%	0.0%	77.3%	2.7	0.4	3.1
Chauncey Wiggins	27	0	8.9	44.4%	40.0%	66.7%	0.9	0.4	2.4
Josh Beadle	33	2	12.8	37.2%	21.4%	63.6%	1.0	0.8	2.3
Dillon Hunter	33	3	12.0	29.8%	15.0%	60.0%	1.2	1.2	1.4
Matt Kelly	6	0	1.2	100%	—	—	0.2	0.2	0.7
Daniel Nauseef	7	0	1.1	66.7%	—	—	0.6	0.1	0.6
Jack Nauseef	6	0	1.1	0.0%	0.0%	50.0%	0.2	0.3	0.2
Devin Foster	7	0	1.1	0.0%	0.0%	0.0%	0.1	—	0.0

== See also ==
- 2022–23 Clemson Tigers women's basketball team
