= Jupiter Christian School =

Coordinates: 26.927572°N 80.118579°W

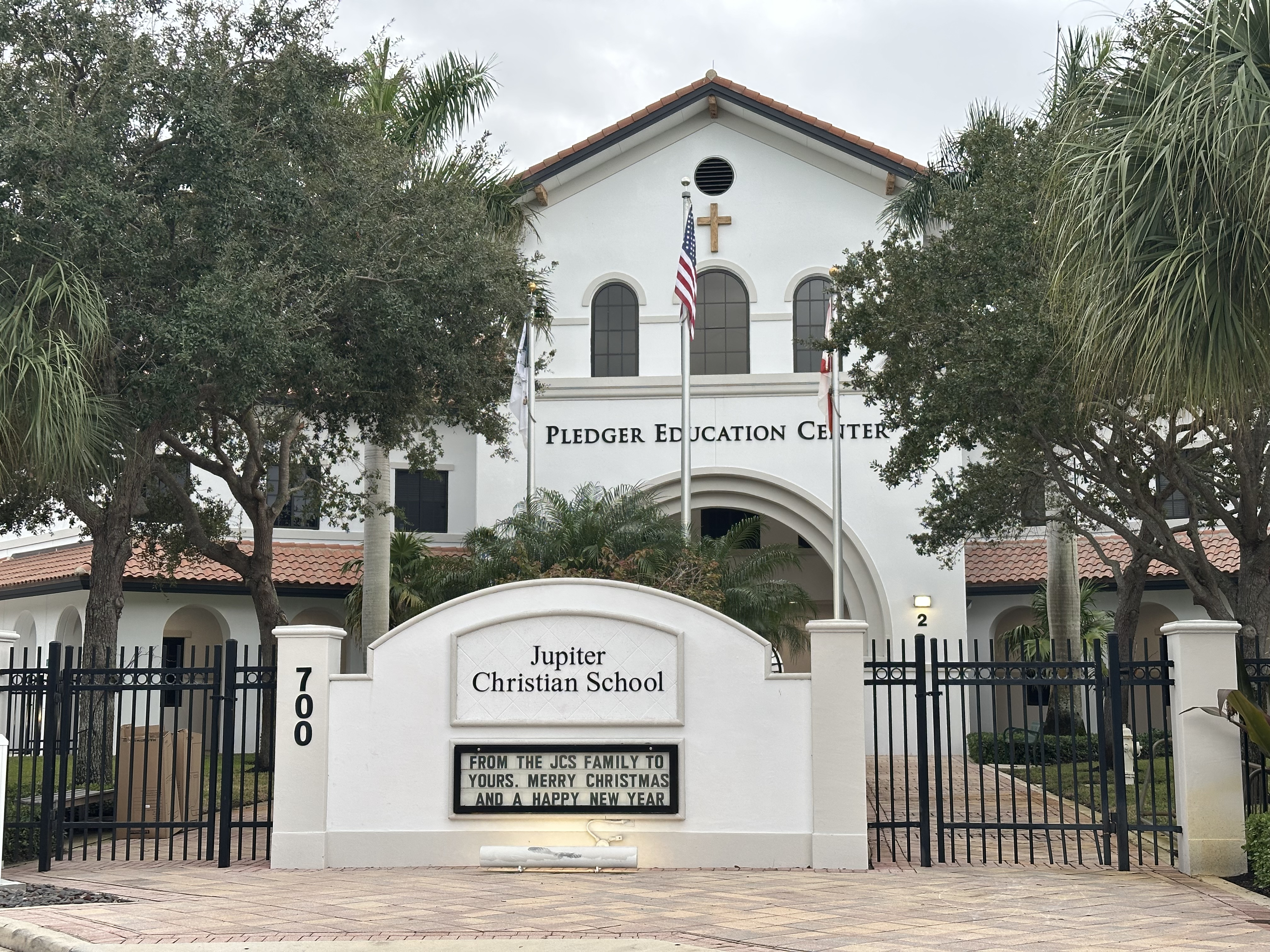

Location
- 700 South Delaware Blvd; Jupiter, Florida 33458; United States

Information
- Motto: World-changing education from a life-changing perspective
- Denomination: Nondenominational
- Established: 1963
- President: Jay Boggess
- Teaching staff: 79
- Grades: PK-12
- Enrollment: 896
- Student to teacher ratio: 11.1 (as of 2020)
- Colors: Black, Red and White
- Athletics: Varsity, JV, Middle School: Golf, Football, Basketball, Cheerleading, Soccer, Lacrosse, Track and Field, Cross-country, Volleyball, Wrestling, Baseball
- Mascot: Eagle
- Team name: Jupiter Christian School Eagles
- Website: http://www.jupiterchristian.org/

Jupiter Christian School is a private Christian school in Jupiter, Florida. It was established in 1963 and serves approximately 896 students in pre K - 2 through 12th grade.

== History ==
Jupiter Christian School opened in September 1963.

It is accredited by the Association of Christian Schools International and the Southern Association of Colleges and Schools Council on Accreditation and School Improvement. The school is also a member of Christian Schools of Palm Beach County and the National Council for Private School Accreditation.

== Demographics ==
In 2022, ProPublica reported the student body was 88.0% White and 2.0% Black, while the local school district was 29.0% White, 36.9% Hispanic and 27.5% Black.

== Extracurricular activities ==
The school's athletic teams attend the Florida High School Athletic Association competition. Teams are fielded in baseball, basketball, cheer leading, cross country, football, golf, swimming, lacrosse, soccer, softball, track and field, tennis, volleyball, and wrestling.

State championship titles held by the school's teams include:

- Football: 2007 (1B), 2008 (1B), 2024, 2025
- Wrestling 2006

== Controversies ==
In 2003, the family of a former student of Jupiter Christian School sued the school for breach of confidentiality and privacy violations after the student discussed his sexuality with a staff member who assured him that the conversation would be confidential and then reported the conversation to the dean of students. The case was filed in the Palm Beach Circuit Court and, after a divided court ruling, was appealed to the Florida Supreme Court in 2005.
