= Washington Irving School =

Washington Irving School may refer to one of a number of schools named after Washington Irving and called:

- Washington Irving High School (disambiguation)
- Washington Irving Middle School (disambiguation)
- Washington Irving Elementary School (School #2), in Teaneck, NJ closed in 1990.
