= Bill Evans Award =

Annual boys basketball award in West Virginia, US

Each year the Bill Evans Award is given to the person chosen as the best high school boys basketball player in the U.S. state of West Virginia. The award winner is selected by members of the West Virginia Sports Writers Association. The award has been given annually since 1970.

Four recipients of the Bill Evans Award have won twice; Jeff Schneider (1977, 1978), Randy Moss (1994, 1995), Isaac McKneely (2021, 2022), and Eli Sancomb (2025, 2026). Most recipients go to NCAA Division I universities, with a high of ten playing at West Virginia. Six recipients have been selected in the NBA draft; Earl Jones (1979), Gay Elmore (1982), Bimbo Coles (1985), Tamar Slay (1998), Patrick Patterson (2006), O. J. Mayo (2007). Additionally, two recipients have been selected in the NFL draft; Randy Moss and Aaron Dobson (2009).

== Award winners ==
Year	Player	High School	College	Note
1970	Charles Hickox	Parkersburg	West Virginia	
1971	Bill Lindsay	Charles Town	Fairmont State	
1972	Warren Baker	Greenbrier East	West Virginia	
1973	Denny Harris	Charleston	West Virginia State	
1974	Mo Robinson	Welch	West Virginia	
1975	Sam Brooks	Charleston	Louisville	
1976	Will Johnson	DuPont	Concord	
1977	Jeff Schneider	Washington Irving	Virginia Tech	
1978	Jeff Schneider (2)	Washington Irving	Virginia Tech	
1979	Earl Jones	Mount Hope	District of Columbia	1984 NBA draft: 1st round, 23rd overall by the Los Angeles Lakers
1980	David Daniel	Sherman	Charleston (WV)	
1981	Jim Miller	Princeton	Virginia	
1982	Gay Elmore	South Charleston	VMI	1987 NBA draft: 6th round, 133rd overall by the Milwaukee Bucks
1983	Mark Cline	Williamson	Wake Forest	
1984	Herbie Brooks	Mullens	West Virginia	
1985	Bimbo Coles	Greenbrier East	Virginia Tech	1990 NBA draft: 2nd round, 40th overall by the Sacramento Kings
1986	Greg Bell	DuPont	Tennessee	
1987	Tracy Shelton	Oak Hill	West Virginia	
1988	Anthony Strother	Williamson	Garden City CC	
1989	P. G. Green	Oak Hill	West Virginia	
1990	Marsalis Basey	Martinsburg	West Virginia	
1991	Matt Gaudio	Brooke	Penn State	
1992	Jared Prickett	Fairmont Senior	Kentucky	
1993	Ryan Culicerto	Woodrow Wilson	James Madison	
1994	Randy Moss	DuPont	Marshall (football)	
1994	Anthony Scruggs	Woodrow Wilson	Fork Union	
1995	Randy Moss (2)	DuPont	Marshall (football)	1998 NFL draft: 1st round, 21st overall by the Minnesota Vikings
1996	Cornelius Jackson	Oak Hill	Tennessee / Marshall	
1997	Rafael Cruz	Wheeling Park	Massachusetts	
1998	Tamar Slay	Woodrow Wilson	Marshall	2002 NBA draft: 2nd round, 54th overall by the New Jersey Nets
1999	Brett Nelson	Saint Albans	Florida	
2000	Greg Davis	Tug Valley	Charleston (WV) / Pikeville	
2001	Patrick O'Malley	George Washington	Richmond	
2002	Mark Patton	Cabell Midland	Marshall	
2003	Brandon Moore	Spring Valley	Eastern Kentucky / West Virginia Tech	
2004	Adam Williams	Saint Albans	Kentucky / Marshall	
2005	Josh Miller	Capital	Nebraska	
2006	Patrick Patterson	Huntington	Kentucky	2010 NBA draft: 1st round, 14th overall by the Houston Rockets
2007	O. J. Mayo	Huntington	USC	2008 NBA draft: 1st round, 3rd overall by the Minnesota Timberwolves
2008	Bryant Irwin	Bridgeport	Saint Joseph's	
2009	Aaron Dobson	South Charleston	Marshall (football)	2013 NFL draft: 2nd round, 59th overall by the New England Patriots
2010	Noah Cotrill	Logan	West Virginia	
2011	Chase Fischer	Ripley	Wake Forest / BYU	
2012	Boo Lathon	Wheeling Park	West Liberty (football)	
2013	Donte Grantham	Martinsburg	Clemson	
2014	Jon Elmore	George Washington	VMI / Marshall	
2015	Jacob Kilgore	Spring Valley	Marshall	
2016	Tavian Dunn-Martin	Huntington	Akron / Duquesne	
2017	Jarrod West	Notre Dame	Marshall / Louisville	
2018	Taevon Horton	Fairmont Senior	West Virginia / Pikeville	
2019	Jalen Bridges	Fairmont Senior	West Virginia / Baylor	
2020	Kaden Metheny	University	Bowling Green / Liberty	
2021	Isaac McKneely	Poca	Virginia / Louisville	
2022	Isaac McKneely (2)	Poca	Virginia / Louisville	
2023	Eli Allen	James Monroe	Nova Southeastern	
2024	Sharron Young	Morgantown	Akron	
2025	Eli Sancomb	Wheeling Central	Liberty	
2026	Noah Lewis	George Washington	Wright State	
2026	Eli Sancomb (2)	Wheeling Central	Liberty	

== Most winners by college ==
Number	Program
10	West Virginia
7	Marshall
3	Kentucky
3	Louisville
2	Akron
2	Charleston (WV)
2	Liberty
2	Marshall (football)
2	Tennessee
2	Virginia
2	Virginia Tech
2	VMI
2	Wake Forest

== Most winners by high school ==
School	Number of Awards	Years
DuPont	4	1976, 1986, 1994, 1995
Fairmont Senior	3	1992, 2018, 2019
George Washington	3	2001, 2014, 2026
Huntington	3	2006, 2007, 2016
Oak Hill	3	1987, 1989, 1996
Woodrow Wilson	3	1993, 1994, 1998
Charleston	2	1973, 1975
Greenbrier East	2	1972, 1985
Martinsburg	2	1990, 2013
Poca	2	2021, 2022
Saint Albans	2	1999, 2004
South Charleston	2	1982, 2009
Spring Valley	2	2003, 2015
Washington Irving	2	1977, 1978
Wheeling Central	2	2025, 2026
Wheeling Park	2	1997, 2012
Williamson	2	1983, 1988
