= 2022–23 NC State Wolfpack men's basketball team =

American college basketball season

2022–23 NC State Wolfpack men's basketball

NCAA tournament, First Round
- Conference: Atlantic Coast Conference
- Record: 23–11 (12–8 ACC)
- Head coach: Kevin Keatts (6th season)
- Assistant coaches: Levi Watkins; Kareem Richardson; Joel Justus
- Home arena: PNC Arena

2022–23 ACC men's basketball standings
	Conf.				Overall
Team	W		L	PCT	W		L	PCT
No. 16 Miami (FL)	15	–	5	.750	29	–	8	.784
No. 14 Virginia	15	–	5	.750	25	–	8	.758
Clemson	14	–	6	.700	23	–	11	.676
No. 12 Duke †	14	–	6	.700	27	–	9	.750
Pittsburgh	14	–	6	.700	24	–	12	.667
NC State	12	–	8	.600	23	–	11	.676
North Carolina	11	–	9	.550	20	–	13	.606
Wake Forest	10	–	10	.500	19	–	14	.576
Syracuse	10	–	10	.500	17	–	15	.531
Boston College	9	–	11	.450	16	–	17	.485
Virginia Tech	8	–	12	.400	19	–	15	.559
Florida State	7	–	13	.350	9	–	23	.281
Georgia Tech	6	–	14	.300	15	–	18	.455
Notre Dame	3	–	17	.150	11	–	21	.344
Louisville	2	–	18	.100	4	–	28	.125
† 2023 ACC tournament winner Rankings from AP poll

The 2022–23 NC State Wolfpack men's basketball team represented North Carolina State University during the 2022–23 NCAA Division I men's basketball season. The Wolfpack were led by sixth-year head coach Kevin Keatts and played their home games at PNC Arena in Raleigh, North Carolina as members of the Atlantic Coast Conference (ACC). They finished the season 23–11, 12–8 in ACC play to finish in sixth place. They defeated Virginia Tech before losing to Clemson in the ACC tournament. They received an at-large bid to the NCAA tournament as the No. 11 seed in the South region. There they lost to Creighton in the first round.

== Previous season ==
The Wolfpack finished the 2021–22 season 11–21, 4–16 in ACC play to finish in 15th place. In the ACC tournament, they lost to Clemson in the first round.

== Offseason ==
=== Departures ===
Departures
Name	Number	Pos.	Height	Weight	Year	Hometown	Reason for departure
Dereon Seabron	1	G	6'7"	180	RS Sophomore	Norfolk, VA	Declare for 2022 NBA draft
Cam Hayes	3	G	6'3"	180	Sophomore	Greensboro, NC	Transferred to LSU
Jericole Hellems	4	F	6'7"	200	Senior	St. Louis, MO	Graduated
Thomas Allen	5	G	6'1"	175	RS Senior	Raleigh, NC	Graduate & transferred to Ball State
Jaylon Gibson	11	F	6'10"	220	Sophomore	Zebulon, NC	Transferred to Winston-Salem State
Manny Bates	15	F	6'11"	230	RS Junior	Fayetteville, NC	Transferred to Butler

=== Incoming transfers ===
Incoming transfers
Name	Number	Pos.	Height	Weight	Year	Hometown	Previous school
Jarkel Joiner	1	G	6'1"	180	GS Senior	Oxford, MS	Ole Miss
Jack Clark	5	G	6'8"	200	RS Junior	Wyncote, PA	La Salle
Dusan Mahorcic	11	F	6'10"	226	GS Senior	Belgrade, Serbia	Utah
D. J. Burns	30	F	6'9"	275	RS Senior	Rock Hill, SC	Winthrop

=== 2022 recruiting class ===
College recruiting information
Name	Hometown	School	Height	Weight	Commit date
L.J. Thomas #34 PG	Durham, NC	Bull City Prep	6 ft 2 in (1.88 m)	190 lb (86 kg)	Oct 6, 2021
L.J. Thomas #34 PG	Recruit ratings: Scout: Rivals: 247Sports: ESPN: (82)				
Overall recruit ranking:
Note: In many cases, Scout, Rivals, 247Sports, On3, and ESPN may conflict in their listings of height and weight.; In these cases, the average was taken. ESPN grades are on a 100-point scale.; Sources: "2022 Team Ranking". Rivals.

== Roster ==
2022–23 NC State Wolfpack men's basketball team
Players
Coaches

Pos.	#	Name	Height	Weight	Year	Previous school	Hometown
G	0	Terquavion Smith	6 ft 4 in (1.93 m)	165 lb (75 kg)	So	Farmville Central	Greenville, North Carolina
G	1	Jarkel Joiner	6 ft 1 in (1.85 m)	180 lb (82 kg)	GS	Oxford; Ole Miss	Oxford, Mississippi
F	3	Isaiah Miranda	7 ft 1 in (2.16 m)	205 lb (93 kg)	Fr	Southern California Academy	Pawtucket, Rhode Island
G	4	LJ Thomas	6 ft 2 in (1.88 m)	200 lb (91 kg)	Fr	Bull Durham Prep (NC)	Plant City, Florida
G	5	Jack Clark	6 ft 8 in (2.03 m)	200 lb (91 kg)	RS Sr	Cheltenham; La Salle	Wyncote, Pennsylvania
G	10	Breon Pass	6 ft 0 in (1.83 m)	175 lb (79 kg)	So	Reidsville	Reidsville, North Carolina
F	11	Dusan Mahorcic	6 ft 10 in (2.08 m)	225 lb (102 kg)	RS Sr	Notre Dame College Prep; Utah	Belgrade, Serbia
G	12	Chase Graham (W)	6 ft 1 in (1.85 m)	180 lb (82 kg)	Sr	Athens Drive	Raleigh, North Carolina
G	13	KJ Keatts (W)	5 ft 10 in (1.78 m)	155 lb (70 kg)	Fr	Grace Christian School	Cary, North Carolina
G	14	Casey Morsell	6 ft 3 in (1.91 m)	200 lb (91 kg)	Sr	St. John's College; Virginia	Fort Washington, Maryland
G	20	Alex Nunnally (W)	6 ft 2 in (1.88 m)	180 lb (82 kg)	So	Cary Academy	Cary, North Carolina
F	21	Ebenezer Dowuona	6 ft 11 in (2.11 m)	225 lb (102 kg)	Jr	The Heritage School (GA)	Accra, Ghana
G	22	Jordan Snell (W)	6 ft 2 in (1.88 m)	155 lb (70 kg)	Fr	Panther Creek	Cary, North Carolina
F	23	Greg Gantt	6 ft 8 in (2.03 m)	215 lb (98 kg)	RS Jr	Trinity Christian School; Providence	Fayetteville, North Carolina
F	24	Ernest Ross	6 ft 9 in (2.06 m)	190 lb (86 kg)	So	Santa Fe	Alachua, Florida
F	30	D. J. Burns	6 ft 9 in (2.06 m)	275 lb (125 kg)	RS Sr	York Preparatory Academy; Winthrop	Rock Hill, South Carolina

Head coach

- Kevin Keatts (Ferrum)

Assistant coach(es)

- Levi Watkins (NC State)
- Kareem Richardson (Evansville)
- Joel Justus (UNC Wilmington)

Legend

- (C) Team captain
- (S) Suspended
- (I) Ineligible
- (W) Walk-on
- Injured
- Current redshirt

Roster

== Schedule and results ==
Date time, TV	Rank^{#}	Opponent^{#}	Result	Record	High points	High rebounds	High assists	Site (attendance) city, state
Exhibition
November 2, 2022*; 7:00 p.m.		Lees–McRae	W 107–59	–	18 – Smith	9 – Clark	7 – Smith	PNC Arena (2,840); Raleigh, NC
Regular season
November 7, 2022*; 8:00 p.m., ACCNX/ESPN+		Austin Peay	W 99–50	1–0	26 – Smith	9 – Burns	8 – Joiner	PNC Arena (11,109); Raleigh, NC
November 11, 2022*; 7:00 p.m., ACCNX/ESPN+		Campbell	W 73–67	2–0	19 – Smith	10 – Clark	6 – Smith	PNC Arena (12,977); Raleigh, NC
November 15, 2022*; 9:00 p.m., ACCRSN		FIU	W 107–74	3–0	26 – Tied	8 – Mahorcic	6 – Smith	PNC Arena (5,034); Raleigh, NC
November 19, 2022*; 1:00 p.m., ACCNX/ESPN+		Elon	W 74–63	4–0	21 – Clark	13 – Mahorcic	5 – Smith	PNC Arena (11,351); Raleigh, NC
November 23, 2022*; 12:00 p.m., ESPN		vs. No. 3 Kansas; Battle 4 Atlantis quarterfinals	L 74–80	4–1	21 – Morsell	9 – Mahorcic	3 – Smith	Imperial Arena (1,275); Nassau, BAH
November 24, 2022*; 4:00 p.m., ESPNews		vs. Dayton; Battle 4 Atlantis consolation round	W 76–64	5–1	27 – Joiner	9 – Clark	6 – Smith	Imperial Arena (613); Nassau, BAH
November 25, 2022*; 10:00 p.m., ESPN2		vs. Butler; Battle 4 Atlantis fifth-place game	W 76–61	6–1	15 – Joiner	8 – Clark	5 – Smith	Imperial Arena (385); Nassau, BAH
November 29, 2022*; 7:00 p.m., ACCNX/ESPN+		William & Mary	W 85–64	7–1	23 – Morsell	9 – Mahorcic	7 – Smith	PNC Arena (10,029); Raleigh, NC
December 2, 2022; 7:00 p.m., ACCN		Pittsburgh	L 60–68	7–2 (0–1)	15 – Smith	9 – Clark	4 – Smith	PNC Arena (12,798); Raleigh, NC
December 6, 2022*; 7:00 p.m., ACCRSN		Coppin State	W 94–72	8–2	33 – Smith	10 – Clark	7 – Smith	Reynolds Coliseum (5,500); Raleigh, NC
December 10, 2022; 2:00 p.m., ACCRSN		at Miami (FL)	L 73–80	8–3 (0–2)	26 – Joiner	8 – Burns	7 – Smith	Watsco Center (4,880); Coral Gables, FL
December 13, 2022*; 6:30 p.m., ACCN		Furman	W 92–73	9–3	24 – Smith	5 – Tied	6 – Joiner	PNC Arena (9,996); Raleigh, NC
December 17, 2022*; 10:30 p.m., CBSSN		vs. Vanderbilt; Legends of Basketball Showcase	W 70–66	10–3	18 – Burns	9 – Burns	5 – Smith	United Center (5,578); Chicago, IL
December 22, 2022; 7:00 p.m., ACCN		Louisville	W 76–64	11–3 (1–2)	17 – Burns	9 – Clark	6 – Clark	PNC Arena (12,446); Raleigh, NC
December 30, 2022; 4:00 p.m., ACCN		at Clemson	L 64–78	11–4 (1–3)	21 – Smith	11 – Clark	5 – Joiner	Littlejohn Coliseum (5,969); Clemson, SC
January 4, 2023; 7:00 p.m., ACCN		No. 16 Duke	W 84–60	12–4 (2–3)	24 – Smith	9 – Morsell	9 – Joiner	PNC Arena (15,188); Raleigh, NC
January 7, 2023; 7:30 p.m., ACCRSN		at Virginia Tech	W 73–69	13–4 (3–3)	22 – Smith	9 – Gantt	3 – Smith	Cassell Coliseum (8,925); Blacksburg, VA
January 14, 2023; 12:00 p.m., ACCRSN		No. 16 Miami (FL)	W 83–81 ^{OT}	14–4 (4–3)	20 – Smith	9 – Tied	7 – Burns	PNC Arena (16,819); Raleigh, NC
January 17, 2023; 7:00 p.m., ACCN		at Georgia Tech	W 78–66	15–4 (5–3)	25 – Smith	9 – Morsell	5 – Smith	McCamish Pavilion (4,242); Atlanta, GA
January 21, 2023; 5:00 p.m., ACCN		at North Carolina; Rivalry	L 69–80	15–5 (5–4)	18 – Tied	5 – Gantt	3 – Joiner	Dean Smith Center (21,750); Chapel Hill, NC
January 24, 2023; 7:00 p.m., ACCN		Notre Dame	W 85–82	16–5 (6–4)	28 – Joiner	6 – Joiner	6 – Smith	PNC Arena (15,144); Raleigh, NC
January 28, 2023; 1:00 p.m., ACCN		at Wake Forest; Rivalry	W 79–77	17–5 (7–4)	31 – Burns	10 – Gantt	4 – Joiner	LJVM Coliseum (11,092); Winston-Salem, NC
February 1, 2023; 9:00 p.m., ACCN		Florida State	W 94–66	18–5 (8–4)	32 – Smith	7 – Morsell	3 – Tied	PNC Arena (12,206); Raleigh, NC
February 4, 2023; 1:00 p.m., ACCN		Georgia Tech	W 72–64	19–5 (9–4)	24 – Burns	8 – Burns	10 – Smith	PNC Arena (15,473); Raleigh, NC
February 7, 2023; 9:00 p.m., ACCN	No. 22	at No. 8 Virginia	L 50–63	19–6 (9–5)	19 – Smith	9 – Gantt	6 – Joiner	John Paul Jones Arena (14,070); Charlottesville, VA
February 11, 2023; 12:00 p.m., ACCRSN	No. 22	at Boston College	W 92–62	20–6 (10–5)	26 – Joiner	10 – Burns	6 – Smith	Conte Forum (6,764); Chestnut Hill, MA
February 14, 2023; 7:00 p.m., ACCN	No. 23	at Syracuse	L 72–75	20–7 (10–6)	15 – Tied	10 – Joiner	11 – Joiner	JMA Wireless Dome (18,957); Syracuse, NY
February 19, 2023; 1:00 p.m., ESPN	No. 23	North Carolina; Rivalry	W 77–69	21–7 (11–6)	29 – Joiner	8 – Clark	3 – Smith	PNC Arena (19,500); Raleigh, NC
February 22, 2023; 9:00 p.m., ACCRSN		Wake Forest; Rivalry	W 90–74	22–7 (12–6)	29 – Joiner	6 – Burns	3 – Smith	PNC Arena (15,728); Raleigh, NC
February 25, 2023; 12:00 p.m., ACCRSN		Clemson	L 71–96	22–8 (12–7)	24 – Burns	6 – Tied	5 – Smith	PNC Arena (19,500); Raleigh, NC
February 28, 2023; 7:00 p.m., ESPN		at Duke	L 67–71	22–9 (12–8)	26 – Joiner	8 – Joiner	2 – Tied	Cameron Indoor Stadium (9,314); Durham, NC
ACC tournament
March 8, 2023; 9:30 p.m., ESPN2	(6)	vs. (11) Virginia Tech; Second round	W 97–77	23–9	30 – Smith	8 – Smith	10 – Joiner	Greensboro Coliseum (17,685); Greensboro, NC
March 9, 2023; 9:30 p.m., ESPN	(6)	vs. (3) Clemson; Quarterfinals	L 54–80	23–10	12 – Burns	7 – Tied	3 – Tied	Greensboro Coliseum (17,722); Greensboro, NC
NCAA tournament
March 17, 2023*; 4:00 pm, TNT	(11 S)	vs. (6 S) Creighton; First Round	L 63–72	23–11	32 – Smith	10 – Clark	2 – Joiner	Ball Arena (19,149); Denver, CO
*Non-conference game. ^{#}Rankings from AP Poll. (#) Tournament seedings in parentheses. S=South. All times are in Eastern Time.

== Rankings ==
Ranking movements Legend: ██ Increase in ranking ██ Decrease in ranking — = Not ranked RV = Received votes
	Week																			
Poll	Pre	1	2	3	4	5	6	7	8	9	10	11	12	13	14	15	16	17	18	Final
AP	—	—	—	—	—	—	—	—	—	RV	RV	RV	RV	22	23	RV	RV	—	—	Not released
Coaches	—	—	—	—	—	—	—	—	—	—	RV	RV	RV	22	22	24	RV	RV	RV	—

*AP does not release post-NCAA tournament rankings
^Coaches did not release a Week 2 poll.
