= Kenneth Moore =

Kenneth Moore may refer to:

== Gridiron football ==
- Ken Moore (American football) (1917–2003), American football offensive lineman
- Kenneth Moore (American football) (born 1985), American football wide receiver
- Kenny Moore II (born 1995), American football cornerback
- Ken Moore (Canadian football) (1925–2016), Canadian football player

=== Other people ===
- Kenneth Moore (ice hockey) (1910–1982), Canadian ice hockey player
- Kenny Moore (runner) (1943–2022), American distance runner and journalist
- Ken Moore (cricketer) (1940–1998), English cricketer
- Kenneth Moore or Big Moe (1974–2007), American rapper

== See also ==
- Kenneth More (1914–1982), English actor
- Ken More (1907–1993), Canadian politician
