= 2022–23 Virginia Cavaliers men's basketball team =

American college basketball season

2022–23 Virginia Cavaliers men's basketball

ACC regular season co–champions Continental Tire Main Event champions

NCAA tournament, First Round
- Conference: Atlantic Coast Conference

Ranking
- Coaches: No. 23
- AP: No. 14
- Record: 25–8 (15–5 ACC)
- Head coach: Tony Bennett (14th season)
- Associate head coach: Jason Williford (14th season)
- Assistant coaches: Orlando Vandross (5th season); Kyle Getter (2nd season)
- Offensive scheme: Blocker-Mover
- Base defense: Pack-Line
- Home arena: John Paul Jones Arena

2022–23 ACC men's basketball standings
	Conf.				Overall
Team	W		L	PCT	W		L	PCT
No. 16 Miami (FL)	15	–	5	.750	29	–	8	.784
No. 14 Virginia	15	–	5	.750	25	–	8	.758
Clemson	14	–	6	.700	23	–	11	.676
No. 12 Duke †	14	–	6	.700	27	–	9	.750
Pittsburgh	14	–	6	.700	24	–	12	.667
NC State	12	–	8	.600	23	–	11	.676
North Carolina	11	–	9	.550	20	–	13	.606
Wake Forest	10	–	10	.500	19	–	14	.576
Syracuse	10	–	10	.500	17	–	15	.531
Boston College	9	–	11	.450	16	–	17	.485
Virginia Tech	8	–	12	.400	19	–	15	.559
Florida State	7	–	13	.350	9	–	23	.281
Georgia Tech	6	–	14	.300	15	–	18	.455
Notre Dame	3	–	17	.150	11	–	21	.344
Louisville	2	–	18	.100	4	–	28	.125
† 2023 ACC tournament winner Rankings from AP poll

The 2022–23 Virginia Cavaliers men's basketball team represented the University of Virginia during the 2022–23 NCAA Division I men's basketball season. The team was led by head coach Tony Bennett in his 14th year and played their home games at John Paul Jones Arena in Charlottesville, Virginia, as members of the Atlantic Coast Conference. They finished the season with an 25–8 record, 15–5 in ACC play, to finish in a tie for first place and clinch a share of their sixth regular season title in ten seasons, and their eleventh ACC regular season title in school history. They defeated North Carolina and Clemson to reach the championship game of the ACC tournament, where they lost to Duke. They received a bid to NCAA tournament as the No. 4 seed in the East region, where they were upset in the first round by Furman.

== Previous season ==
The 2021–22 Cavaliers finished the season 21–14, 12–8 in ACC Play to finish in 6th place. They defeated Louisville in the econd round of the ACC Tournament before losing in the quarterfinals to North Carolina. They received an at-large bid to the National Invitation Tournament, where they defeated Mississippi State and North Texas to advance to the quarterfinals, where they lost to St. Bonaventure.

The Cavaliers did not qualify for the NCAA Tournament for the first time since 2012–13, to end their disappointing season.

== Offseason ==
=== Departures ===
Virginia departures
Name	Number	Pos.	Height	Weight	Year	Hometown	Reason for departure
Jayden Nixon	5	G	6'3"	200	Senior	Charlottesville, VA	Graduated & transferred to Johns Hopkins
Malachi Poindexter	11	G	6'2"	190	Sophomore	Mineral, VA	Transferred to Illinois State
Kody Stattmann	23	G	6'8"	200	Senior	Bentley Park, Queensland, Australia	Graduated (Note: Due to COVID-19, the NCAA declared that the 2020–21 season would not count against the eligibility of any basketball player. Nixon and Stattmann both could have returned for the 2022–23 season but chose not to do so.)
Igor Miličić Jr.	24	G/F	6'10"	224	Freshman	Rovinj, Croatia	Transferred to Charlotte
Carson McCorkle	33	G	6'3"	185	Sophomore	Raleigh, NC	Transferred to Wofford

=== Incoming transfers ===
Virginia incoming transfers
Name	Number	Pos.	Height	Weight	Year	Hometown	Previous school	Years remaining	Date eligible
Ben Vander Plas	5	F	6'8"	232	(redshirt) Graduate student	Ripon, WI	Ohio	1	October 1, 2022
Dante Harris		G	6'0"	170	Junior	Washington, D.C.	Georgetown	3	October 1, 2023 (Note: Harris transferred to Virginia on December 18, 2022. He would redshirt the entire 2022–23 season and have three seasons of eligibility.)

=== 2022 recruiting class ===
College recruiting
Name	Hometown	School	Height	Weight	Commit date
Isaac McKneely; SG	Poca, WV	Poca	6 ft 4 in (1.93 m)	175 lb (79 kg)	Jan 30, 2021
Isaac McKneely; SG	Recruit ratings: Rivals: 247Sports: ESPN: (83)				
Leon Bond; SF	Wauwatosa, WI	Wauwatosa East	6 ft 5 in (1.96 m)	183 lb (83 kg)	Jul 30, 2021
Leon Bond; SF	Recruit ratings: Rivals: 247Sports: ESPN: (83)				
Isaac Traudt; PF	Grand Island, NE	Grand Island Senior	6 ft 9 in (2.06 m)	207 lb (94 kg)	Aug 28, 2021
Isaac Traudt; PF	Recruit ratings: Rivals: 247Sports: ESPN: (86)				
Ryan Dunn; SF/SG	Freeport, NY	Perkiomen School	6 ft 6 in (1.98 m)	190 lb (86 kg)	Sep 18, 2021
Ryan Dunn; SF/SG	Recruit ratings: Rivals: 247Sports: ESPN: (82)				
Overall recruit ranking: Rivals: 16 247Sports: 12 ESPN: –
Note: In many cases, Scout, Rivals, 247Sports, On3, and ESPN may conflict in their listings of height and weight.; In these cases, the average was taken. ESPN grades are on a 100-point scale.; Sources: "Virginia 2022 Basketball Commitments". Rivals.; "2022 Virginia Commits". Scout.; "2022 Player Commits". ESPN.; "Scout.com Team Recruiting Rankings". Scout.; "2022 Team Ranking". Rivals.; "Virginia 2022 Basketball Commitments". 247Sports.

^ESPN has not released its team rankings for 2022.

== Roster ==
=== Players ===
2021–22 Virginia Cavaliers men's basketball team
Players
Coaches

Pos.	#	Name	Height	Weight	Year	Previous school	Hometown
G	0	Kihei Clark	5 ft 10 in (1.78 m)	167 lb (76 kg)	GS	Taft Charter	Woodland Hills, CA
F	1	Jayden Gardner	6 ft 6 in (1.98 m)	233 lb (106 kg)	GS	Heritage; East Carolina	Wake Forest, NC
G	2	Reece Beekman	6 ft 3 in (1.91 m)	190 lb (86 kg)	Jr	Scotlandville Magnet	Baton Rouge, LA
G	4	Armaan Franklin	6 ft 4 in (1.93 m)	200 lb (91 kg)	Sr	Cathedral; Indiana	Indianapolis, IN
F	5	Ben Vander Plas	6 ft 8 in (2.03 m)	236 lb (107 kg)	GS	Ripon; Ohio	Ripon, WI
G	10	Taine Murray	6 ft 5 in (1.96 m)	205 lb (93 kg)	So	Rosmini College	Auckland, New Zealand
G	11	Isaac McKneely	6 ft 4 in (1.93 m)	179 lb (81 kg)	Fr	Poca	Poca, WV
G	12	Chase Coleman (W)	5 ft 9 in (1.75 m)	165 lb (75 kg)	Sr	Maury	Norfolk, VA
G/F	13	Ryan Dunn	6 ft 7 in (2.01 m)	208 lb (94 kg)	Fr	Perkiomen School	Freeport, NY
F/C	21	Kadin Shedrick	6 ft 11 in (2.11 m)	231 lb (105 kg)	RS Jr	Holly Springs	Holly Springs, NC
C	22	Francisco Cáffaro	7 ft 1 in (2.16 m)	254 lb (115 kg)	RS Sr	NBA Global Academy	Santa Fe, Argentina
F	23	Isaac Traudt (redshirt)	6 ft 9 in (2.06 m)	229 lb (104 kg)	Fr	Grand Island Senior	Grand Island, NE
F	24	Tristan How (W)	6 ft 7 in (2.01 m)	202 lb (92 kg)	Jr	Norfolk Collegiate	Virginia Beach, VA
F	35	Leon Bond (redshirt)	6 ft 5 in (1.96 m)	200 lb (91 kg)	Fr	Wauwatosa East	Wauwatosa, WI
G		Dante Harris (redshirt)	6 ft 0 in (1.83 m)	170 lb (77 kg)	Jr	Lakeway Christian Academy; Georgetown	Washington, D.C.

Head coach

- Tony Bennett

Assistant coach(es)

- Jason Williford
- Orlando Vandross
- Kyle Getter

Legend

- (C) Team captain
- (S) Suspended
- (I) Ineligible
- (W) Walk-on
- Injured
- Current redshirt

Roster
Last update: December 18, 2022

=== Coaches ===
Virginia coaching staff
Name	Position	Year with position	Year on coaching staff	Alma mater	Hometown
Tony Bennett	Dean and Markel Families head coach	14	14	UW-Green Bay	Clintonville, WI
Jason Williford	Associate head coach	5	14	Virginia	Richmond, VA
Orlando Vandross	Assistant coach	5	8	American International	United States
Kyle Getter	Assistant coach	2	5	Hanover	Miamisburg, OH
Brad Soderberg	Director of scouting	2	8	UW-Stevens Point	Wausau, WI
Larry Mangino	Director of player development	2	7	Montclair State	United States
Johnny Carpenter	Director of player personnel	5	8	Virginia	Great Falls, VA
Isaiah Wilkins	Graduate assistant	2	2	Virginia	Lilburn, GA
Mike Curtis	Strength and conditioning coach	14	14	Virginia	Richmond, VA
Ethan Saliba	Head athletic trainer	25	40	Kansas	United States
Ronnie Wideman	Associate AD for basketball administration/operations	13	14	Washington State	Washougal, WA

== Schedule and results ==
Date time, TV	Rank^{#}	Opponent^{#}	Result	Record	High points	High rebounds	High assists	Site (attendance) city, state
Summer Tour: Cavaliers in Italy
August 13, 2022; 1:00 pm		vs. Stella Azzurra	W 76–24	1–0	13 – Shedrick	7 – Tied	7 – Beekman	Arena Altero Felici; Rome, Italy
August 15, 2022; 1:00 pm		vs. Orange1 Basket Bassano	W 71–41	2–0	19 – Traudt	8 – Bond	5 – Clark	A.S.D. Pino Dragons Basket Firenze; Florence, Italy
August 18, 2022; 1:30 pm		vs. KK Mega MIS	L 73–92	2–1	19 – Shedrick	12 – Shedrick	6 – Clark	Palazzetto dello Sport; Santa Margherita Ligure, Italy
August 19, 2022; 12:00 pm		vs. KK Mega MIS	W 94–87 ^{2OT}	3–1	23 – Clark	7 – Cáffaro	5 – Beekman	Palazzetto dello Sport; Santa Margherita Ligure, Italy (Note: Comune of Rapallo)
Regular season
November 7, 2022*; 9:00 pm, ACCRSN	No. 18	NC Central	W 73–61	1–0	21 – Franklin	9 – Gardner	5 – Tied	John Paul Jones Arena (13,238); Charlottesville, VA
November 11, 2022*; 9:00 pm, ACCRSN	No. 18	Monmouth; Continental Tire Main Event campus game	W 89–42	2–0	15 – McKneely	7 – Shedrick	7 – Clark	John Paul Jones Arena (13,487); Charlottesville, VA
November 14, 2022*; 8:00 pm, ACCN	No. 16	Northern Iowa	Canceled due to the 2022 University of Virginia shooting					John Paul Jones Arena; Charlottesville, VA
November 18, 2022*; 7:00 pm, ESPN2	No. 16	vs. No. 5 Baylor; Continental Tire Main Event semifinal	W 86–79	3–0	26 – Franklin	4 – Tied	10 – Beekman	T-Mobile Arena; Paradise, NV
November 20, 2022*; 3:00 pm, ESPN	No. 16	vs. No. 19 Illinois; Continental Tire Main Event championship	W 70–61	4–0	17 – Beekman	10 – Vander Plas	3 – Tied	T-Mobile Arena; Paradise, NV
November 25, 2022*; 6:00 pm, ACCN	No. 5	Maryland Eastern Shore	W 72–45	5–0	26 – Gardner	7 – Vander Plas	8 – Clark	John Paul Jones Arena (13,882); Charlottesville, VA
November 29, 2022*; 9:30 pm, ESPN	No. 3	at Michigan; ACC/B1G Challenge	W 70–68	6–0	18 – Beekman	11 – Gardner	5 – Beekman	Crisler Center (12,200); Ann Arbor, MI
December 3, 2022; 2:00 pm, ESPN2	No. 3	Florida State	W 62–57	7–0 (1–0)	18 – Clark	7 – Gardner	5 – Beekman	John Paul Jones Arena (14,280); Charlottesville, VA
December 6, 2022*; 8:00 pm, ACCN	No. 3	James Madison	W 55–50	8–0	18 – Clark	8 – Gardner	7 – Clark	John Paul Jones Arena (14,193); Charlottesville, VA
December 17, 2022*; 2:00 pm, ESPN2	No. 2	No. 5 Houston	L 61–69	8–1	16 – Shedrick	6 – Tied	8 – Clark	John Paul Jones Arena (14,629); Charlottesville, VA
December 20, 2022; 8:30 pm, ACCN	No. 6	at No. 22 Miami (FL)	L 64–66	8–2 (1–1)	20 – Vander Plas	9 – Beekman	9 – Beekman	Watsco Center (7,257); Coral Gables, FL
December 28, 2022*; 6:00 pm, ACCN	No. 13	Albany	W 66–46	9–2	20 – Franklin	7 – Gardner	10 – Clark	John Paul Jones Arena (14,269); Charlottesville, VA
December 31, 2022; 12:00 p.m., ACCN	No. 13	at Georgia Tech	W 74–56	10–2 (2–1)	15 – Clark	6 – Vander Plas	8 – Clark	McCamish Pavilion (5,371); Atlanta, GA
January 3, 2023; 9:00 pm, ACCN	No. 11	at Pittsburgh	L 65–68	10–3 (2–2)	17 – Clark	6 – Beekman	8 – Clark	Peterson Events Center (6,464); Pittsburgh, PA
January 7, 2023; 5:00 pm, ACCN	No. 11	Syracuse	W 73–66	11–3 (3–2)	16 – Franklin	7 – Shedrick	11 – Clark	John Paul Jones Arena (14,217); Charlottesville, VA
January 10, 2023; 9:00 pm, ESPN	No. 13	North Carolina	W 65–58	12–3 (4–2)	17 – Vander Plas	9 – Franklin	5 – Beekman	John Paul Jones Arena (14,629); Charlottesville, VA
January 14, 2023; 4:00 pm, ESPN2	No. 13	at Florida State	W 67–58	13–3 (5–2)	20 – Franklin	7 – Tied	6 – Clark	Donald L. Tucker Civic Center (9,043); Tallahassee, FL
January 18, 2023; 7:00 pm, ESPNU	No. 10	Virginia Tech; Commonwealth Clash	W 78–68	14–3 (6–2)	20 – Clark	7 – Vander Plas	7 – Beekman	John Paul Jones Arena (14,629); Charlottesville, VA
January 21, 2023; 2:00 pm, ESPNU	No. 10	at Wake Forest	W 76–67	15–3 (7–2)	25 – Franklin	10 – Franklin	6 – Beekman	LJVM Coliseum (12,443); Winston-Salem, NC
January 28, 2023; 12:00 pm, ACCRSN	No. 7	Boston College	W 76–57	16–3 (8–2)	18 – Tied	7 – Franklin	8 – Beekman	John Paul Jones Arena (14,629); Charlottesville, VA
January 30, 2023; 7:00 pm, ESPN	No. 6	at Syracuse	W 67–62	17–3 (9–2)	17 – Gardner	8 – Gardner	10 – Clark	JMA Wireless Dome (19,272); Syracuse, NY
February 4, 2023; 12:00 pm, ESPN2	No. 6	at Virginia Tech; Commonwealth Clash	L 68–74	17–4 (9–3)	20 – Gardner	10 – Gardner	5 – Beekman	Cassell Coliseum (8,925); Blacksburg, VA
February 7, 2023; 9:00 pm, ACCN	No. 8	No. 22 NC State	W 63–50	18–4 (10–3)	18 – Gardner	6 – Shedrick	6 – Clark	John Paul Jones Arena (14,070); Charlottesville, VA
February 11, 2023; 4:00 pm, ESPN	No. 8	Duke	W 69–62 ^{OT}	19–4 (11–3)	23 – Franklin	6 – Beekman	7 – Beekman	John Paul Jones Arena (14,629); Charlottesville, VA
February 15, 2023; 7:00 pm, ESPNU	No. 7	at Louisville	W 61–58	20–4 (12–3)	14 – Tied	11 – Vander Plas	6 – Clark	KFC Yum! Center (11,570); Louisville, KY
February 18, 2023; 12:00 pm, ESPN2	No. 7	Notre Dame	W 57–55	21–4 (13–3)	15 – Clark	12 – Gardner	5 – Beekman	John Paul Jones Arena (14,230); Charlottesville, VA
February 22, 2023; 7:00 pm, ACCRSN	No. 6	at Boston College	L 48–63	21–5 (13–4)	16 – Gardner	5 – Tied	3 – Clark	Conte Forum (8,194); Chestnut Hill, MA
February 25, 2023; 6:00 pm, ESPN	No. 6	at North Carolina	L 63–71	21–6 (13–5)	19 – Gardner	12 – Gardner	6 – Beekman	Dean Smith Center (21,750); Chapel Hill, NC
February 28, 2023; 7:00 pm, ACCN	No. 13	Clemson	W 64–57	22–6 (14–5)	12 – Tied	9 – Gardner	8 – Beekman	John Paul Jones Arena (14,351); Charlottesville, VA
March 4, 2023; 2:00 pm, ESPN2	No. 13	Louisville; Senior Day	W 75–60	23–6 (15–5)	16 – Tied	4 – Tied	11 – Beekman	John Paul Jones Arena (14,149); Charlottesville, VA
ACC Tournament
March 9, 2023; 7:00 p.m., ESPN	(2) No. 13	vs. (7) North Carolina; Quarterfinals	W 68–59	24–6	17 – Gardner	10 – Gardner	5 – Beekman	Greensboro Coliseum (17,772); Greensboro, NC
March 10, 2023; 9:30 p.m., ESPN2	(2) No. 13	vs. (3) Clemson; Semifinals	W 76–56	25–6	23 – Gardner	12 – Gardner	7 – Beekman	Greensboro Coliseum (15,316); Greensboro, NC
March 11, 2023; 8:30 p.m., ESPN	(2) No. 13	vs. (4) No. 21 Duke; Championship	L 49–59	25–7	12 – Beekman	7 – Shedrick	4 – Beekman	Greensboro Coliseum (19,116); Greensboro, NC
NCAA tournament
March 16, 2023*; 12:40 pm, TruTV	(4 S) No. 14	vs. (13 S) Furman; First Round	L 67–68	25–8	15 – Shedrick	13 – Shedrick	5 – Tied	Amway Center; Orlando, FL
*Non-conference game. ^{#}Rankings from AP Poll. (#) Tournament seedings in parentheses. S=South. All times are in Eastern Time.

== Rankings ==
Ranking movements Legend: ██ Increase in ranking ██ Decrease in ranking ( ) = First-place votes
	Week																			
Poll	Pre	1	2	3	4	5	6	7	8	9	10	11	12	13	14	15	16	17	18	Final
AP	18	16	5 (1)	3 (2)	3 (3)	2 (19)	6	13	11	13	10	7	6	8	7	6	13	13	14	Not released
Coaches	18	14	6	3 (1)	3	2 (12)	6	12	11	12	10	6	4	9	6 (1)	6 (1)	12	11	10	23

*AP does not release post-NCAA Tournament rankings.
