= Frank T. Schnell =

American archaeologist

Frank T. Schnell (1941–2010) was an American archaeologist. He was a native of Columbus, Georgia, and conducted the majority of his archaeological research in this area of the Chattahoochee River Valley. Schnell studied at the University of Georgia and received his bachelor's and master's degrees. He studied for his doctorate at Tulane University, but he took a museum job before he was able to complete this degree. In 1966 he began working for the Columbus Museum.

He conducted research, and was considered an expert on the Cemochehobee Mound site located in Fort Gaines, Georgia. He published Cemochechobee: Archaeology of a Mississippian Ceremonial Center on the Chattahoochee River in 1981. He retired, as curator, from the Columbus Museum in 2001.
