= Washington Irving Middle School =

Washington Irving Middle School may refer to:

- Washington Irving Middle School (West Virginia), in Clarksburg, West Virginia
- Washington Irving Middle School (Los Angeles), in Los Angeles, California
- Washington Irving Middle School (Springfield) in Springfield, Virginia
- Washington Irving Middle School in Roslindale, Massachusetts

== See also ==
- Washington Irving High School (disambiguation)
