= 2022–23 Louisville Cardinals men's basketball team =

American college basketball season

2022–23 Louisville Cardinals men's basketball
- Conference: Atlantic Coast Conference
- Record: 4–28 (2–18 ACC)
- Head coach: Kenny Payne (1st season)
- Associate head coach: Danny Manning
- Assistant coaches: Nolan Smith; Josh Jamieson
- Home arena: KFC Yum! Center

2022–23 ACC men's basketball standings
	Conf.				Overall
Team	W		L	PCT	W		L	PCT
No. 16 Miami (FL)	15	–	5	.750	29	–	8	.784
No. 14 Virginia	15	–	5	.750	25	–	8	.758
Clemson	14	–	6	.700	23	–	11	.676
No. 12 Duke †	14	–	6	.700	27	–	9	.750
Pittsburgh	14	–	6	.700	24	–	12	.667
NC State	12	–	8	.600	23	–	11	.676
North Carolina	11	–	9	.550	20	–	13	.606
Wake Forest	10	–	10	.500	19	–	14	.576
Syracuse	10	–	10	.500	17	–	15	.531
Boston College	9	–	11	.450	16	–	17	.485
Virginia Tech	8	–	12	.400	19	–	15	.559
Florida State	7	–	13	.350	9	–	23	.281
Georgia Tech	6	–	14	.300	15	–	18	.455
Notre Dame	3	–	17	.150	11	–	21	.344
Louisville	2	–	18	.100	4	–	28	.125
† 2023 ACC tournament winner Rankings from AP poll

The 2022–23 Louisville Cardinals men's basketball team represented the University of Louisville during the 2022–23 NCAA Division I men's basketball season. The team played its home games on Denny Crum Court at the KFC Yum! Center in downtown Louisville, Kentucky as members of the Atlantic Coast Conference (ACC). They were led by first-year head coach Kenny Payne.

The team's 0–9 start was its worst since the 1940–41 season, when the Cardinals began the season 0–11. Before their first win of the season against Western Kentucky on December 14, 2022, the Cardinals contended with California for the worst start in modern history for any team that was at the time a member of a power conference, defined here as a member of a Power Five conference or the Big East Conference. California was the first such team to fall to 0–7, doing so on November 26, 2022; Louisville reached that mark three days later. California fell to 0–12 before its first win of the season. The Cardinals' start was still the worst for any team in ACC history.

The Cardinals finished the season 4–28 and 2–18 in ACC play to finish in fifteenth place. As the fifteenth seed in the ACC tournament, they lost to tenth seed Boston College in the First Round. They were not invited to the NCAA tournament or the NIT. Their 28 losses were the most in program history, and their four wins were the lowest since 1940–41.

== Previous season ==
The Cardinals finished the 2021–22 season 13–19, 6–14 in ACC play to finish in a three-way tie for 11th place. As the No. 11 seed in the ACC tournament, they defeated Georgia Tech before losing to Virginia in the second round.

Head coach Chris Mack was fired on January 26, 2022, after starting the season 11–9. Associate coach Mike Pegues was named the interim coach for the remainder of the season. On March 16, the school named former Louisville player Kenny Payne the team's new head coach.

== Offseason ==
=== Departures ===
Departures
Name	Number	Pos.	Height	Weight	Year	Hometown	Reason for departure
Noah Locke	0	G	6'3"	205	Senior	Baltimore, MD	Graduate transferred to Providence
Sam Bearden	2	F	6'5"	180	Sophomore	Louisville, KY	Walk-on; didn't return
Malik Williams	5	F/C	6'11"	250	GS Senior	Fort Wayne, IN	Graduated
Samuell Williamson	10	F	6'7"	210	Junior	Rockwall, TX	Transferred to SMU
Mason Faulkner	11	G	6'1"	190	GS Senior	Glasgow, KY	Graduated
Jarrod West	13	G	5'11"	180	GS Senior	Clarksburg, VA	Graduated
Dre Davis	14	G/F	6'5"	220	Sophomore	Indianapolis, IN	Transferred to Seton Hall
Drew Schultz	15	F	6'4"	205	Sophomore	Rockwall, TX	Walk-on; didn't return
Gabe Wiznitzer	23	C	6'11"	240	Sophomore	Walhalla, SC	Transferred to Ohio
Matt Cross	33	F	6'7"	225	Sophomore	Beverly, MA	Transferred to UMass
Brad Colbert	45	G	6'2"	185	Sophomore	Loveland, OH	Walk-on; transferred to Xavier

=== Incoming transfers ===
Incoming transfers
Name	Number	Pos.	Height	Weight	Year	Hometown	Previous school
Brandon Huntley-Hatfield	5	F	6'10"	246	Sophomore	Clarksville, TN	Tennessee
Hercy Miller	11	G	6'3"	176	Sophomore	Los Angeles, CA	Xavier
Zan Payne	23	G/F	6'4"	215	RS Senior	Lexington, KY	Kentucky
Aidan McCool	33	G	6'3"	165	Junior	Charleston, SC	Maryland

=== 2022 recruiting class ===
College recruiting information
Name	Hometown	School	Height	Weight	Commit date
Kamari Lands #3 SF	Indianapolis, IN	Hillcrest Prep	6 ft 7 in (2.01 m)	180 lb (82 kg)	Jan 1, 2022
Kamari Lands #3 SF	Recruit ratings: Scout: Rivals: 247Sports: ESPN: (88)				
Devin Ree #25 SF	Terry, MS	Oak Hill Academy	6 ft 7 in (2.01 m)	185 lb (84 kg)	Apr 30, 2022
Devin Ree #25 SF	Recruit ratings: Scout: Rivals: 247Sports: ESPN: (82)				
Fabio Basili; SG	Orlando, FL	Oakridge High School	6 ft 5 in (1.96 m)	175 lb (79 kg)	Aug 17, 2022
Fabio Basili; SG	Recruit ratings: Scout: Rivals: 247Sports: ESPN: (NR)				
Overall recruit ranking:
Note: In many cases, Scout, Rivals, 247Sports, On3, and ESPN may conflict in their listings of height and weight.; In these cases, the average was taken. ESPN grades are on a 100-point scale.; Sources: "2022 Louisville Commitments". Rivals.; "Men's Basketball Recruiting". Scout.; "ESPN- Louisville Cardinals Men's Basketball Recruiting". ESPN.; "Scout.com Team Recruiting Rankings". Scout.; "2022 Team Ranking". Rivals.

=== 2023 recruiting class ===
College recruiting information (2023)
Name	Hometown	School	Height	Weight	Commit date
Kaleb Glenn #27 PF	Louisville, KY	Louisville Male High School	6 ft 5 in (1.96 m)	220 lb (100 kg)	Sep 24, 2021
Kaleb Glenn #27 PF	Recruit ratings: Scout: Rivals: 247Sports: ESPN: (83)				
Overall recruit ranking:
Note: In many cases, Scout, Rivals, 247Sports, On3, and ESPN may conflict in their listings of height and weight.; In these cases, the average was taken. ESPN grades are on a 100-point scale.; Sources: "2023 Louisville Commitments". Rivals.; "Men's Basketball Recruiting". Scout.; "ESPN- Louisville Cardinals Men's Basketball Recruiting". ESPN.; "Scout.com Team Recruiting Rankings". Scout.; "2023 Team Ranking". Rivals.

== Roster ==
2022–23 Louisville Cardinals men's basketball team
Players
Coaches

Pos.	#	Name	Height	Weight	Year	Previous school	Hometown
F	0	Devin Ree	6 ft 8 in (2.03 m)	180 lb (82 kg)	Fr	Oak Hill Academy (VA)	Jackson, MS
G/F	1	Mike James	6 ft 6 in (1.98 m)	215 lb (98 kg)	RS Fr	Oak Ridge	Orlando, FL
G	3	El Ellis	6 ft 3 in (1.91 m)	180 lb (82 kg)	Jr	Quality Education Academy; Tallahassee CC	Durham, NC
F/C	4	Roosevelt Wheeler	6 ft 11 in (2.11 m)	240 lb (109 kg)	So	John Marshall	Richmond, VA
F	5	Brandon Huntley-Hatfield	6 ft 9 in (2.06 m)	245 lb (111 kg)	So	Scotland Campus Prep (PA); Tennessee	Clarksville, TN
G	11	Fabio Basili	6 ft 4 in (1.93 m)	175 lb (79 kg)	Fr	Oak Ridge	Orlando, FL
F	12	JJ Traynor	6 ft 8 in (2.03 m)	190 lb (86 kg)	Jr	Bardstown	Bardstown, KY
G	15	Hercy Miller	6 ft 3 in (1.91 m)	180 lb (82 kg)	So	Minnehaha Academy; Xavier	Minneapolis, MN
F	21	Sydney Curry	6 ft 8 in (2.03 m)	270 lb (122 kg)	Jr	Northrop; John A. Logan College	Fort Wayne, IN
F	22	Kamari Lands	6 ft 8 in (2.03 m)	220 lb (100 kg)	Fr	Hillcrest Prep	Indianapolis, IN
G/F	23	Zan Payne (W)	6 ft 4 in (1.93 m)	230 lb (104 kg)	RS Sr	Lexington Catholic; Kentucky	Lexington, KY
F	24	Jae'Lyn Withers	6 ft 9 in (2.06 m)	230 lb (104 kg)	RS Jr	Cleveland Heights	Charlotte, NC
G	30	Ashton Myles-Devore (W)	6 ft 1 in (1.85 m)	165 lb (75 kg)	Jr	Woodford County	Versailles, KY
G	33	Aidan McCool (W)	6 ft 3 in (1.91 m)	165 lb (75 kg)	Jr	Bishop England; Maryland	Charleston, SC

Head coach

- Kenny Payne (Louisville)

Assistant coach(es)

- Danny Manning (Kansas)
- Nolan Smith (Duke)
- Josh Jamieson (Southern Oregon)

Legend

- (C) Team captain
- (S) Suspended
- (I) Ineligible
- (W) Walk-on
- Injured
- Current redshirt

Roster

== Schedule and results ==
Date time, TV	Rank^{#}	Opponent^{#}	Result	Record	High points	High rebounds	High assists	Site (attendance) city, state
Exhibition
October 30, 2022*; 2:00 p.m., ACCNX/ESPN+		Lenoir–Rhyne	L 47–57		20 – Withers	10 – Withers	6 – Ellis	KFC Yum! Center (12,510); Louisville, KY
November 3, 2022*; 7:00 p.m., ACCNX/ESPN+		Chaminade	W 80–73		28 – Ellis	9 – Tied	5 – Ellis	KFC Yum! Center; Louisville, KY
Regular season
November 9, 2022*; 9:00 p.m., ACCN		Bellarmine	L 66–67	0–1	17 – Withers	10 – Huntley-Hatfield	5 – Ellis	KFC Yum! Center (14,865); Louisville, KY
November 12, 2022*; 1:00 p.m., ACCNX/ESPN+		Wright State	L 72–73	0–2	29 – Ellis	11 – Withers	2 – Tied	KFC Yum! Center (12,270); Louisville, KY
November 15, 2022*; 6:00 p.m., ACCN		Appalachian State	L 60–61	0–3	29 – Ellis	10 – Huntley-Hatfield	3 – Ellis	KFC Yum! Center (11,919); Louisville, KY
November 21, 2022*; 5:00 p.m., ESPN2		vs. No. 9 Arkansas; Maui Invitational Tournament quarterfinals	L 54–80	0–4	13 – Lands	5 – Withers	2 – Ellis	Lahaina Civic Center (2,400); Maui, HI
November 22, 2022*; 2:30 p.m., ESPN2		vs. No. 21 Texas Tech; Maui Invitational Tournament consolation round	L 38–70	0–5	7 – Tied	5 – Withers	3 – Ellis	Lahaina Civic Center (2,400); Maui, HI
November 23, 2022*; 7:30 p.m., ESPNU		vs. Cincinnati; Maui Invitational Tournament 7th–place game	L 62–81	0–6	15 – Huntley–Hatfield	7 – Withers	6 – Ellis	Lahaina Civic Center; Maui, HI
November 29, 2022*; 7:00 p.m., ESPN2		No. 22 Maryland; ACC–Big Ten Challenge	L 54–79	0–7	15 – Ellis	8 – Huntley-Hatfield	3 – Ellis	KFC Yum! Center (12,211); Louisville, KY
December 4, 2022; 1:00 p.m., ACCN		Miami (FL)	L 53–80	0–8 (0–1)	12 – Withers	8 – Huntley-Hatfield	3 – Ellis	KFC Yum! Center (11,811); Louisville, KY
December 10, 2022; 1:00 p.m., ACCN		at Florida State	L 53–75	0–9 (0–2)	15 – Ellis	7 – Withers	4 – Ellis	Donald L. Tucker Civic Center (5,718); Tallahassee, FL
December 14, 2022*; 9:00 p.m., ESPN2		Western Kentucky	W 94–83	1–9	30 – Ellis	6 – Tied	10 – Ellis	KFC Yum! Center (12,417); Louisville, KY
December 17, 2022*; 2:00 p.m., ACCRSN		Florida A&M	W 61–55	2–9	13 – Tied	19 – Curry	7 – Ellis	KFC Yum! Center (11,736); Louisville, KY
December 20, 2022*; 6:00 p.m., ACCNX/ESPN+		Lipscomb	L 67–75	2–10	24 – Ellis	7 – Curry	6 – Ellis	KFC Yum! Center (11,861); Louisville, KY
December 22, 2022; 7:00 p.m., ACCN		at NC State	L 64–76	2–11 (0–3)	16 – Curry	12 – Huntley-Hatfield	2 – Ellis	PNC Arena (12,446); Raleigh, NC
December 31, 2022*; 12:00 p.m., CBS		at No. 19 Kentucky; Rivalry	L 63–86	2–12	23 – Ellis	4 – Huntley-Hatfield	2 – Ellis	Rupp Arena (20,934); Lexington, KY
January 3, 2023; 7:00 p.m., ESPNews		Syracuse	L 69–70	2–13 (0–4)	20 – Ellis	8 – Huntley-Hatfield	9 – Ellis	KFC Yum! Center (11,506); Louisville, KY
January 7, 2023; 3:00 p.m., ACCN		Wake Forest	L 72–80	2–14 (0–5)	24 – James	8 – James	8 – Ellis	KFC Yum! Center (11,986); Louisville, KY
January 11, 2023; 9:00 p.m., ACCRSN		at Clemson	L 70–83	2–15 (0–6)	17 – James	6 – Curry	5 – Ellis	Littlejohn Coliseum (7,789); Clemson, SC
January 14, 2023; 2:00 p.m., ESPN		North Carolina	L 59–80	2–16 (0–7)	22 – Ellis	8 – Withers	4 – Ellis	KFC Yum! Center (14,842); Louisville, KY
January 18, 2023; 7:00 p.m., ACCN		Pittsburgh	L 54–75	2–17 (0–8)	19 – Ellis	7 – Withers	5 – Ellis	KFC Yum! Center (11,579); Louisville, KY
January 25, 2023; 9:00 p.m., ACCN		at Boston College	L 65–75	2–18 (0–9)	17 – Ellis	7 – Withers	5 – Ellis	Conte Forum (5,688); Chestnut Hill, MA
January 28, 2023; 12:00 p.m., ESPN2		at Notre Dame	L 62–76	2–19 (0–10)	14 – James	5 – Okorafor	6 – Ellis	Joyce Center (6,531); South Bend, IN
February 1, 2023; 7:00 p.m., ACCRSN		Georgia Tech	W 68–58	3–19 (1–10)	19 – Withers	13 – Withers	4 – Ellis	KFC Yum! Center (11,416); Louisville, KY
February 4, 2023; 2:00 p.m., ESPN2		Florida State	L 78–81	3–20 (1–11)	22 – Ellis	6 – Curry	7 – Ellis	KFC Yum! Center (12,966); Louisville, KY
February 7, 2023; 7:00 p.m., ACCN		at Pittsburgh	L 57–91	3–21 (1–12)	11 – James	6 – Okorafor	3 – Tied	Peterson Events Center (7,577); Pittsburgh, PA
February 11, 2023; 7:00 p.m., ACCN		at No. 19 Miami (FL)	L 85–93	3–22 (1–13)	33 – Ellis	5 – Withers	5 – Ellis	Watsco Center (6,540); Coral Gables, FL
February 15, 2023; 7:00 p.m., ESPNU		No. 7 Virginia	L 58–61	3–23 (1–14)	21 – Ellis	9 – Traynor	3 – Ellis	KFC Yum! Center (11,570); Louisville, KY
February 18, 2023; 7:00 p.m., ACCN		Clemson	W 83–73	4–23 (2–14)	28 – Ellis	9 – Tied	4 – Lands	KFC Yum! Center (15,157); Louisville, KY
February 20, 2023; 7:00 p.m., ESPN		at Duke	L 62–79	4–24 (2–15)	21 – Ellis	5 – Huntley-Hatfield	7 – Ellis	Cameron Indoor Stadium (9,314); Durham, NC
February 25, 2023; 2:00 p.m., ACCRSN		at Georgia Tech	L 67–83	4–25 (2–16)	15 – Tied	9 – Withers	3 – Tied	McCamish Pavilion (6,070); Atlanta, GA
February 28, 2023; 9:00 p.m., ACCN		Virginia Tech	L 54–71	4–26 (2–17)	14 – Tied	6 – Traynor	1 – Tied	KFC Yum! Center (11,879); Louisville, KY
March 4, 2023; 2:00 p.m., ESPN2		at No. 13 Virginia	L 60–75	4–27 (2–18)	24 – James	5 – Basili	2 – Tied	John Paul Jones Arena (14,149); Charlottesville, VA
ACC tournament
March 7, 2023; 4:30 p.m., ACCN	(15)	vs. (10) Boston College; First round	L 62–80	4–28	16 – Ellis	7 – Tied	5 – Ellis	Greensboro Coliseum (7,231); Greensboro, NC
*Non-conference game. ^{#}Rankings from AP Poll. (#) Tournament seedings in parentheses. All times are in Eastern Time.

Schedule Source:

== Rankings ==
Ranking movements Legend: — = Not ranked
	Week																			
Poll	Pre	1	2	3	4	5	6	7	8	9	10	11	12	13	14	15	16	17	18	Final
AP	—	—	—	—	—	—	—	—	—	—	—	—	—	—	—	—	—	—	—	Not released
Coaches	—	—	—	—	—	—	—	—	—	—	—	—	—	—	—	—	—	—	—	—

*AP does not release post-NCAA tournament rankings
^Coaches did not release a Week 2 poll.
