= D. J. Burns =

American basketball player (born 2000)

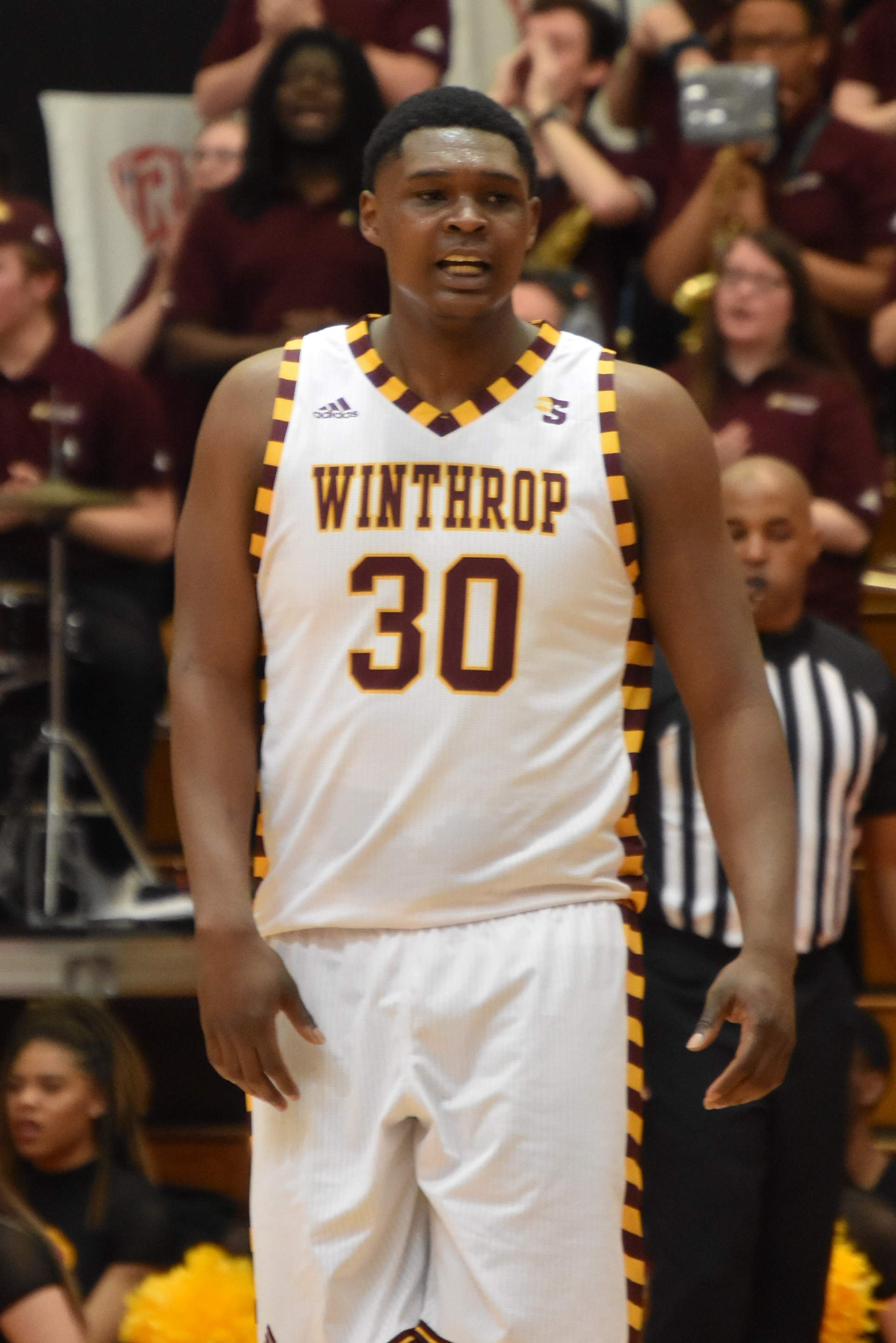
- Burns with Winthrop in 2020.

No. 30 – Bnei Herzliya
- Position: Power forward / center
- League: Israel Basketball Premier League

Personal information
- Born: October 13, 2000 (age 26) Rock Hill, South Carolina, U.S.
- Listed height: 6 ft 9 in (2.06 m)
- Listed weight: 275 lb (125 kg)

Career information
- High school: York Prep Academy (Rock Hill, South Carolina)
- College: Winthrop (2019–2022); NC State (2022–2024)
- NBA draft: 2024: undrafted
- Playing career: 2024–present

Career history
- 2024–2025: Goyang Sono Skygunners
- 2026–present: Bnei Herzliya

Career highlights
- ACC tournament MVP (2024); Big South Player of the Year (2022); First-team All-Big South (2022); Big South Freshman of the Year (2020)

Dwight Keith Burns Jr. (born October 13, 2000) is an American professional basketball player for Bnei Herzliya in the Israeli Basketball Premier League. He played college basketball for the Winthrop Eagles and NC State Wolfpack.

== Early life ==
Burns grew up in Rock Hill, South Carolina and attended Clover Intermediate School, standing 6'7" in eighth grade. He enrolled at York Preparatory Academy. As a freshman, Burns averaged 13 points and 11 rebounds per game. He averaged 14.2 points, 8.1 rebounds, 3.2 assists and 3.1 blocks per game as a sophomore. As a junior, Burns averaged 14.2 points and 10.3 rebounds per game, earning MVP honors of the C. Dan Joyner Poinsettia Classic and the USA National Prep Championship. He reclassified from the Class of 2019 to the Class of 2018. In three seasons, Burns recorded over 1,000 career points and over 1,000 rebounds. A top 100 recruit, Burns committed to playing college basketball for Tennessee in June 2018, choosing the Volunteers over offers from South Carolina and Virginia.

== College career ==
Burns redshirted his freshman season at Tennessee and lost weight. Following the season, he transferred to Winthrop and received a waiver for immediate eligibility. Burns was named Big South Freshman of the Year. He averaged 11.9 points and 4.1 rebounds per game.

As a sophomore, Burns averaged 10.1 points and 3.4 rebounds per game, earning Honorable Mention All-Big South honors. He declared for the 2021 NBA draft, but ultimately returned to Winthrop.

During his junior season debut, he scored a career-high 30 points in a 110–78 win against Mary Baldwin University. He averaged 15.0 points, (6th in the Big South Conference), 4.5 rebounds, 1.1 assists, and 20.9 minutes per game while shooting .626 from the field (leading the conference). As a junior, Burns was named Big South Player of the Year.

In May 2022, Burns announced he would play for NC State in the Atlantic Coast Conference for the 2022–23 season. At the conclusion of that season, Burns was named All-ACC Honorable mention.

On March 16, 2024, Burns was named ACC Tournament MVP after leading NC State to its first ACC crown since 1987. Burns had 20 points, 7 assists, and hit the only three-pointer of his college career in the Championship game against rival North Carolina. On March 31, 2024, Burns was named MOP of the NCAA Tournament's South Region after leading NC State to the first Final Four since 1983. Burns scored 29 points in the Elite Eight game against rival Duke.

== Professional career ==
After going undrafted in the 2024 NBA draft, Burns signed with the Cleveland Cavaliers to play for them during the 2024 NBA Summer League.

On September 14, 2024, Burns signed with the Goyang Sono Skygunners of the Korean Basketball League (KBL) to replace Jarnell Stokes. In 54 games, he averaged 9.3 points, 3.6 rebounds, and 2.1 assists in 18.7 minutes per game.

On October 25, 2025, Burns was acquired by the Greensboro Swarm through the NBA G League Draft's undrafted player pool. However, he was waived on October 31.

On January 5, 2026, Burns signed with the Bnei Herzliya of the Israeli Basketball Premier League.

== Career statistics ==
Legend
GP	Games played	GS	Games started	MPG	Minutes per game
FG%	Field goal percentage	3P%	3-point field goal percentage	FT%	Free throw percentage
RPG	Rebounds per game	APG	Assists per game	SPG	Steals per game
BPG	Blocks per game	PPG	Points per game	**Bold**	Career high

=== College ===
Year	Team	GP	GS	MPG	FG%	3P%	FT%	RPG	APG	SPG	BPG	PPG
2018–19	Tennessee	Redshirt										
2019–20	Winthrop	33	16	17.5	.583	.000	.571	4.1	1.2	.5	.7	11.9
2020–21	Winthrop	25	24	15.7	.582	.000	.610	3.4	.6	.6	.5	10.1
2021–22	Winthrop	32	27	20.9	**.626**	.000	.646	4.5	1.1	.5	.4	**15.0**
2022–23	NC State	34	22	22.9	.561	.000	.615	**4.8**	1.5	**.7**	**.9**	12.9
2023–24	NC State	**41**	**40**	**24.8**	.531	**.200**	**.680**	4.0	**2.9**	.4	.6	12.5
Career		165	129	20.8	.573	.009	.629	4.2	1.6	.5	.6	12.6

== Personal life ==
Burns's father, Dwight Sr., is the agent in charge of York County for South Carolina Probation, Parole and Pardon Services. His mother, Takela, is an assistant principal at Mount Gallant Elementary School. Burns has a younger sister, Nadia. Burns is a multi-instrumentalist, playing the stand-up bass, tuba, piano, handbells and saxophone. Burns is a devout Christian.
