= Brandon Huntley-Hatfield =

American basketball player (born 2003)

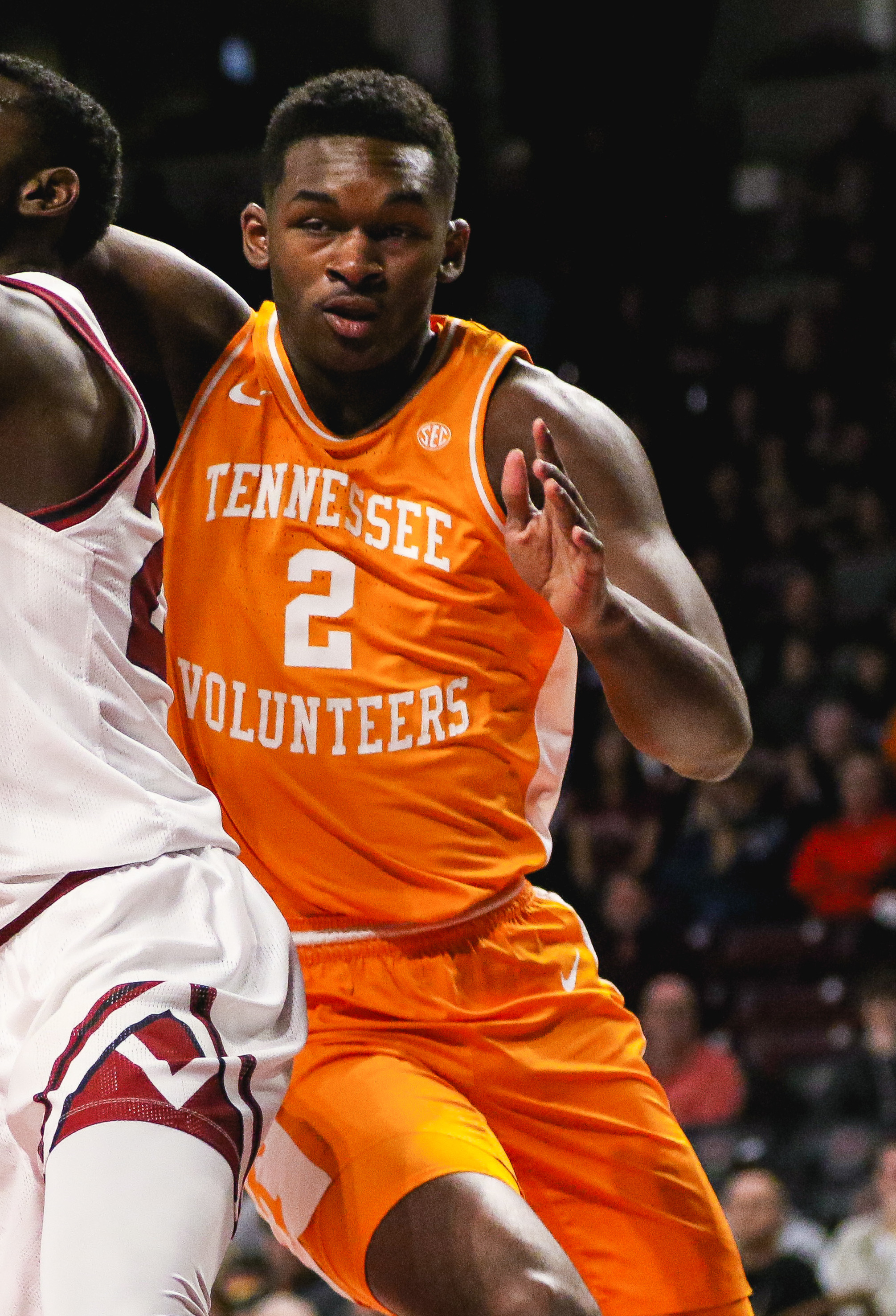

Free agent
- Position: Power forward / center

Personal information
- Born: August 6, 2003 (age 23) Clarksville, Tennessee, U.S.
- Listed height: 6 ft 10 in (2.08 m)
- Listed weight: 246 lb (112 kg)

Career information
- High school: Clarksville Academy (Clarksville, Tennessee); IMG Academy (Bradenton, Florida); Scotland Campus (Scotland, Pennsylvania)
- College: Tennessee (2021–2022); Louisville (2022–2024); NC State (2024–2025)
- Playing career: 2025–present

Career history
- 2025–2026: Keravnos
- 2026: Juventus Utena

Brandon Xavier Huntley-Hatfield (born August 6, 2003) is an American professional basketball player who recently played for Juventus Utena of the Lithuanian Basketball League (LKL) and the Basketball Champions League (BCL). He played college basketball for the NC State Wolfpack, the Louisville Cardinals, and the Tennessee Volunteers.

== High school career ==
Huntley-Hatfield first played high school basketball for Clarksville Academy in Clarksville, Tennessee, where he averaged 11.4 points and six rebounds per game as a freshman. For his next two years, he transferred to IMG Academy in Bradenton, Florida. He played his final season at Scotland Campus in Scotland, Pennsylvania.

=== Recruiting ===
Huntley-Hatfield was considered a five-star recruit by 247Sports and ESPN, and a four-star recruit by Rivals. On April 15, 2021, he reclassified to the 2021 class and committed to playing college basketball for Tennessee over offers from Ole Miss, Syracuse, Wake Forest, Auburn and Kansas.

College recruiting
Name	Hometown	School	Height	Weight	Commit date
Brandon Huntley-Hatfield; PF	Clarksville, TN	Scotland Campus (PA)	6 ft 9 in (2.06 m)	220 lb (100 kg)	Apr 15, 2021
Brandon Huntley-Hatfield; PF	Recruit ratings: Rivals: 247Sports: ESPN: (91)				
Overall recruit ranking: Rivals: 35 247Sports: 23 ESPN: 21
Note: In many cases, Scout, Rivals, 247Sports, On3, and ESPN may conflict in their listings of height and weight.; In these cases, the average was taken. ESPN grades are on a 100-point scale.; Sources: "Tennessee 2021 Basketball Commitments". Rivals.; "2021 Tennessee Volunteers Recruiting Class". ESPN.; "2021 Team Ranking". Rivals.

== College career ==
As a freshman, Huntley-Hatfield averaged 3.9 points and 3.0 rebounds per game. He became a starter for the final 13 games due to an injury to Olivier Nkamhoua. Following the season, Huntley-Hatfield transferred to Louisville. He averaged 6.7 points and 5.4 rebounds across 24 games as a sophomore. His junior year saw him start all 32 games, averaging 12.9 points on 56.7% shooting and leading the team with 8.4 rebounds per game before transferring to NC State for his senior year.

== Professional career ==
On 29 June 2026, Huntley-Hatfield signed with Juventus Utena of the Lithuanian Basketball League (LKL) and the Basketball Champions League (BCL). On 8 October 2026, Juventus Utena parted ways with Huntley-Hatfield, the contract was terminated by mutual agreement.

== Career statistics ==
Legend
GP	Games played	GS	Games started	MPG	Minutes per game
FG%	Field goal percentage	3P%	3-point field goal percentage	FT%	Free throw percentage
RPG	Rebounds per game	APG	Assists per game	SPG	Steals per game
BPG	Blocks per game	PPG	Points per game	**Bold**	Career high

=== College ===
Year	Team	GP	GS	MPG	FG%	3P%	FT%	RPG	APG	SPG	BPG	PPG
2021–22	Tennessee	**35**	13	12.5	.457	.154	.593	2.9	.3	.3	.3	3.9
2022–23	Louisville	24	21	25.6	.472	.278	.750	5.4	.6	**.6**	**.8**	6.7
2023–24	Louisville	32	**32**	**30.8**	**.567**	**.429**	.672	**8.4**	1.0	**.6**	**.8**	**12.9**
2024–25	NC State	26	10	19.7	.504	.333	**.800**	4.8	**1.1**	.5	.4	7.2
Career		117	76	21.8	.514	.310	.708	5.4	.7	.5	.6	7.7
