= Isaac McKneely =

American basketball player (born 2003)

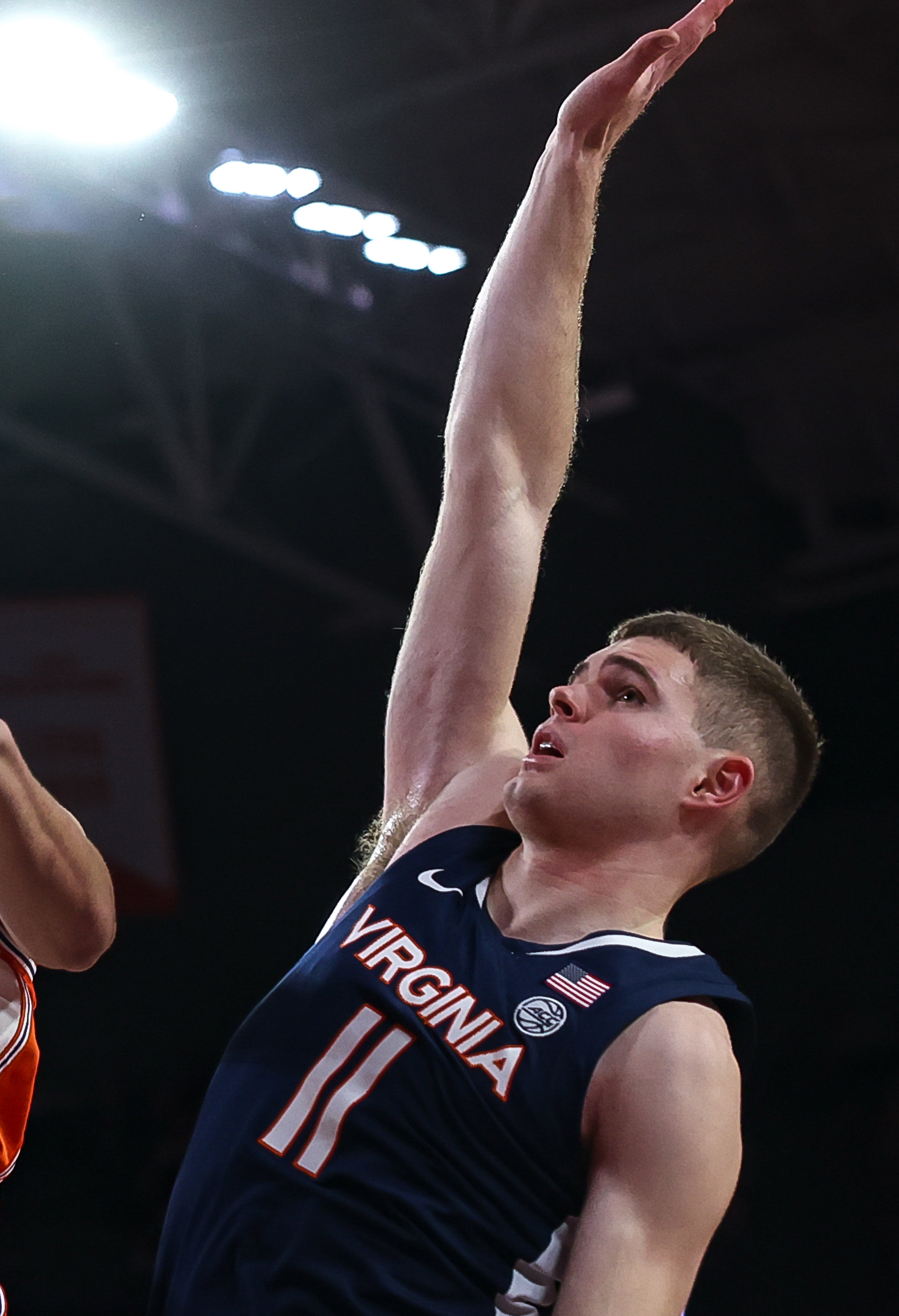
- McKneely in 2024

No. 27 – College Park Skyhawks
- Position: Shooting guard
- League: NBA G League

Personal information
- Born: November 10, 2003 (age 23) Poca, West Virginia, U.S.
- Listed height: 6 ft 4 in (1.93 m)
- Listed weight: 195 lb (88 kg)

Career information
- High school: Poca (Poca, West Virginia)
- College: Virginia (2022–2025); Louisville (2025–2026)
- NBA draft: 2026: undrafted
- Playing career: 2026–present

Career history
- 2026–present: College Park Skyhawks

Career highlights
- 2× Bill Evans Award (2021, 2022)
- Stats at NBA.com
- Stats at Basketball Reference

Isaac Lee McKneely (born November 10, 2003) is an American basketball player for the College Park Skyhawks of the NBA G League. He previously played college basketball for the Virginia Cavaliers and Louisville Cardinals.

== Early life and high school career ==
McKneely grew up in Poca, West Virginia and attended Poca High School. He was named the Kanawha Valley Player of the Year as a sophomore after averaging 22 points per game. McKneely averaged 23 points, 4.3 rebounds, and 3.9 assists per game during his junior season and won the Bill Evans Award as the high school boys basketball player in West Virginia and was also named the state Gatorade Player of the Year. He repeated as the Gatorade Player of the Year and Bill Evans Award winner as a senior after averaging 22 points, six rebounds, four assists per game. McKneely lead the Poca Dots to defeat the Bluefield Beavers in the WVSSAC AA State Championship game 65–48. He recorded 22 points, seven rebounds, and four assists in this game.

=== Recruiting ===
McKneely was a consensus four-star recruit in the 2022 class according to major recruiting services. On January 30, 2021, he committed to playing college basketball for Virginia over offers from Purdue, Illinois, West Virginia and Louisville.

College recruiting
Name	Hometown	School	Height	Weight	Commit date
Isaac McKneely; SG	Poca, WV	Poca (WV)	6 ft 4 in (1.93 m)	175 lb (79 kg)	Jan 30, 2021
Isaac McKneely; SG	Recruit ratings: Rivals: 247Sports: ESPN: (83)				
Overall recruit ranking: Rivals: 78 247Sports: 52 ESPN: 72
Note: In many cases, Scout, Rivals, 247Sports, On3, and ESPN may conflict in their listings of height and weight.; In these cases, the average was taken. ESPN grades are on a 100-point scale.; Sources: "Virginia 2022 Basketball Commitments". Rivals.; "2022 Virginia Cavaliers Recruiting Class". ESPN.; "2022 Team Ranking". Rivals.

== College career ==
McKneely entered his freshman season at Virginia as a reserve shooting guard. He averaged 6.7 points and 2.2 rebounds per game while leading the Cavaliers with a 39.2% three-point field goal percentage. McNeely was also named to the Atlantic Coast Conference's All-Academic team. As a sophomore, he averaged 12.3 points, 3.0 rebounds, 1.7 assists and 0.6 steals per game. McKneely averaged 14.4 points, 2.9 assists and 2.7 rebounds per game, while also shooting 43.9 percent from the field as a junior. He transferred to Louisville following his junior year. McKneeley averaged 10.9 points, 3.0 rebounds, and 1.4 assists per game for the Cardinals.

== Professional career ==
On June 25, 2026, McKneely agreed to an Exhibit 10 contract with the Atlanta Hawks, where he would participate with the team for the 2026 NBA Summer League. The deal became official on September 21.

== Career statistics ==
Legend
GP	Games played	GS	Games started	MPG	Minutes per game
FG%	Field goal percentage	3P%	3-point field goal percentage	FT%	Free throw percentage
RPG	Rebounds per game	APG	Assists per game	SPG	Steals per game
BPG	Blocks per game	PPG	Points per game	**Bold**	Career high

=== College ===
Year	Team	GP	GS	MPG	FG%	3P%	FT%	RPG	APG	SPG	BPG	PPG
2022–23	Virginia	**33**	1	21.5	.423	.392	.708	2.2	.7	.4	.1	6.7
2023–24	Virginia	**33**	**33**	32.4	.409	**.445**	**.847**	**3.0**	1.6	.6	**.2**	12.3
2024–25	Virginia	32	32	**34.4**	**.439**	.421	.814	2.7	**2.9**	**.8**	.1	**14.4**
Career		98	66	34.4	.424	.422	.810	2.6	1.7	.6	.1	11.1
