= Washington Irving High School =

Washington Irving High School may refer to:

- Washington Irving High School (New York City)
- Washington Irving High School (Tarrytown, New York)
- Washington Irving High School (West Virginia)

== See also ==
- Washington Irving Middle School (disambiguation)
