= Jalen Bridges =

American basketball player (born 2001)

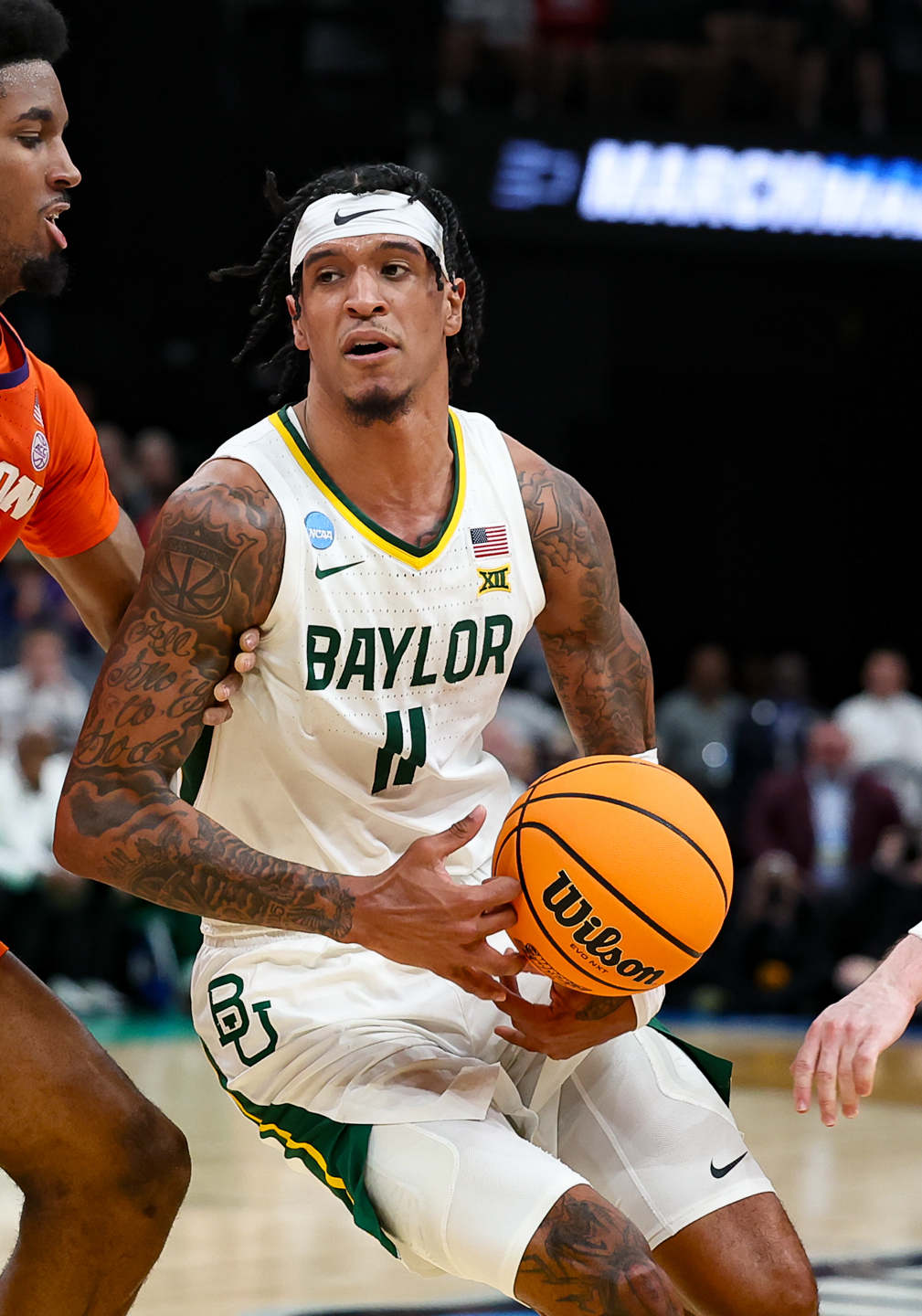
- Bridges with Baylor in 2024

No. 11 – Windy City Bulls
- Position: Small forward
- League: NBA G League

Personal information
- Born: May 14, 2001 (age 25) Fairmont, West Virginia, U.S.
- Listed height: 6 ft 7 in (2.01 m)
- Listed weight: 221 lb (100 kg)

Career information
- High school: Fairmont Senior (Fairmont, West Virginia)
- College: West Virginia (2020–2022); Baylor (2022–2024)
- NBA draft: 2024: undrafted
- Playing career: 2024–present

Career history
- 2024–2025: Phoenix Suns
- 2024–2025: →Valley Suns
- 2025–2026: Maine Celtics
- 2026–present: Windy City Bulls

Career highlights
- Third-team All-Big 12 (2024); Big 12 All-Freshman Team (2021); Bill Evans Award (2019)
- Stats at NBA.com
- Stats at Basketball Reference

Jalen Lashaun Bridges (born May 14, 2001) is an American professional basketball player for the Windy City Bulls of the NBA G League. He played college basketball for the West Virginia Mountaineers and the Baylor Bears.

== High school career ==
Bridges played basketball for Fairmont Senior High School in Fairmont, West Virginia. He helped his team win back-to-back Class AA state titles in his first two years. As a senior, he averaged 21.6 points, 6.7 rebounds and 2.2 blocks per game, leading his team to its fourth straight state title game. He won the Bill Evans Award as the top high school player in the state of West Virginia. A consensus four-star recruit, he committed to playing college basketball for West Virginia over offers from Miami (Florida), Indiana, Xavier and Alabama.

== College career ==
After initially planning to play a postgraduate season, Bridges joined West Virginia for his first season as a redshirt. On March 4, 2021, he recorded freshman season-highs of 22 points and 12 rebounds in a 76–67 win over TCU. As a freshman, Bridges averaged 5.9 points and 3.6 rebounds per game, earning Big 12 All-Freshman Team honors. He averaged 8.4 points and 4.8 rebounds per game as a sophomore.

Following the 2021-22 season, Bridges transferred to Baylor. He averaged 10.3 points and 5.6 rebounds per game as a junior. Bridges declared for the 2023 NBA draft before withdrawing to return to Baylor. He averaged 12.2 points, 5.7 rebounds, 1.4 assists and 1.1 blocks per game and was named to the Third Team All-Big 12.

== Professional career ==
After going undrafted in the 2024 NBA draft, Bridges signed a two-way contract with the Phoenix Suns on July 4, 2024. Bridges appeared in eight games for the Suns as a rookie, averaging 1.1 points per game.

During the 2025 NBA Summer League, Bridges played for the Boston Celtics. He was waived by Boston as part of final roster cuts on October 16, 2025. He joined the Celtics' NBA G League affiliate, the Maine Celtics, for the 2025–26 season.

Bridges was traded to the Windy City Bulls on September 29, 2026.

== Career statistics ==
Legend
| GP | Games played | GS | Games started | MPG | Minutes per game |
| FG% | Field goal percentage | 3P% | 3-point field goal percentage | FT% | Free throw percentage |
| RPG | Rebounds per game | APG | Assists per game | SPG | Steals per game |
| BPG | Blocks per game | PPG | Points per game | **Bold** | Career high |

=== NBA ===
| Year | Team | GP | GS | MPG | FG% | 3P% | FT% | RPG | APG | SPG | BPG | PPG |
|---|---|---|---|---|---|---|---|---|---|---|---|---|
| 2024–25 | Phoenix | 8 | 0 | 3.8 | .286 | .286 | .750 | .5 | .0 | .0 | .0 | 1.1 |
| Career | | 8 | 0 | 3.8 | .286 | .286 | .750 | .5 | .0 | .0 | .0 | 1.1 |

=== College ===
| Year | Team | GP | GS | MPG | FG% | 3P% | FT% | RPG | APG | SPG | BPG | PPG |
|---|---|---|---|---|---|---|---|---|---|---|---|---|
| 2019–20 | West Virginia | Redshirt | | | | | | | | | | |
| 2020–21 | West Virginia | 28 | 19 | 18.1 | .496 | .409 | .714 | 3.6 | .3 | .5 | .4 | 5.9 |
| 2021–22 | West Virginia | 33 | 33 | 26.8 | .428 | .325 | **.823** | 4.8 | .8 | 1.0 | .7 | 8.4 |
| 2022–23 | Baylor | 34 | 34 | 27.3 | **.506** | .324 | .778 | 5.6 | 1.0 | .9 | **1.0** | 10.3 |
| 2023–24 | Baylor | **35** | **35** | **31.7** | .466 | **.412** | **.823** | **5.7** | **1.4** | **1.1** | .6 | **12.2** |
| Career | | 130 | 121 | 26.4 | .472 | .370 | .796 | 5.0 | .9 | .9 | .7 | 9.4 |

== Personal life ==
Bridges is married to his wife named Maddox who has been with Bridges since his days at West Virginia University. They got married in 2025.
