= Tavian Dunn-Martin =

American basketball player (born 1998)

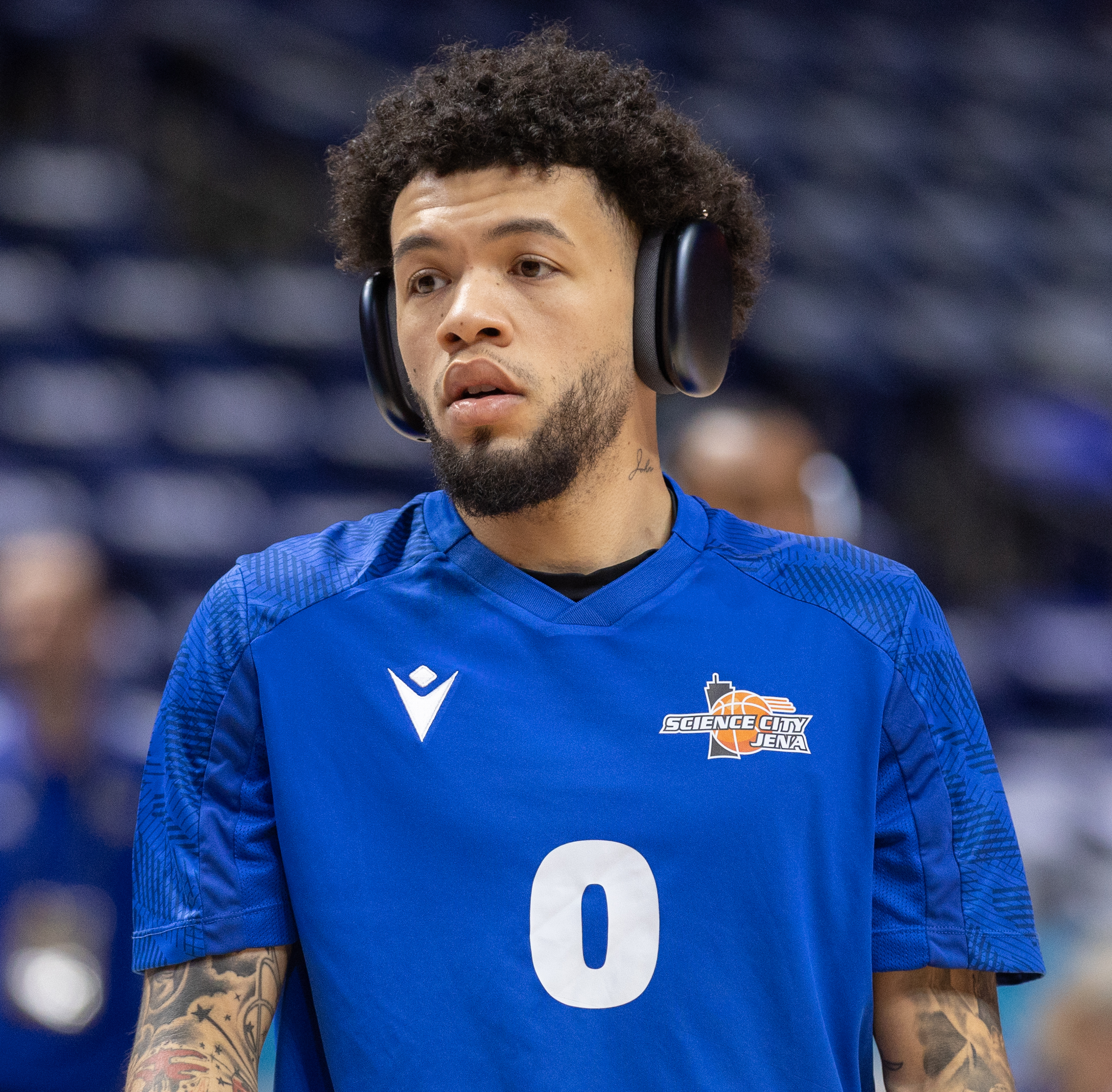
- Dunn-Martin with Science City Jena in 2025

No. 7 – Balıkesir BSB
- Position: Point guard
- League: Türkiye Basketbol Ligi

Personal information
- Born: March 16, 1998 (age 28) Huntington, West Virginia, U.S.
- Listed height: 5 ft 8 in (1.73 m)
- Listed weight: 161 lb (73 kg)

Career information
- High school: Huntington (Huntington, West Virginia)
- College: Akron (2016–2017); Duquesne (2018–2021); Florida Gulf Coast (2021–2022)
- Playing career: 2022–present

Career history
- 2022–2023: Šentjur
- 2023: Chorale Roanne Basket
- 2023: Mornar Bar
- 2024: Donar Groningen
- 2024–2025: Montreal Alliance
- 2025–2026: Science City Jena
- 2026: Darüşşafaka
- 2026: Saskatoon Mamba
- 2026–present: Balıkesir BSB

Career highlights
- Bill Evans Award (2016); Atlantic 10 Conference Sixth Man of the Year (2018); National Association of Basketball Coaches All-District First Team (2022); Atlantic Sun Newcomer of the Year (2022); Atlantic Sun First Team All-Conference (2022)

Tavian Dunn-Martin (born March 16, 1998) is an American professional basketball player for Balıkesir BSB of the Türkiye Basketbol Ligi (TBL). He played college basketball for the Akron Zips, Duquesne Dukes, and Florida Gulf Coast Eagles.

== Early life ==
Dunn-Martin was born in Huntington, West Virginia. He attended Huntington High School, where he played basketball, in addition to competing in football and baseball. As a senior he averaged 21.0 points and 4.0 assists per game and was named the 2015–16 Bill Evans Award winner. His father, Frank Dunn-Martin, played collegiately at Marshall University in the early 1990s.

== College career ==
=== Akron (2016–2017) ===
Dunn-Martin began his college career at Akron under head coach Keith Dambrot, appearing in 36 games as a freshman and averaging 4.0 points per game.

=== Duquesne (2018–2021) ===
When Dambrot left Akron for Duquesne, Dunn-Martin transferred with him. After sitting out 2017–18 under NCAA transfer rules, he was named Atlantic 10 Conference Sixth Man of the Year in 2018–19. Over three seasons, he played 80 games, scoring 738 points and recording 219 assists.

=== Florida Gulf Coast (2021–2022) ===
Using a COVID-19 eligibility extension, Dunn-Martin transferred to Florida Gulf Coast for his sixth and final college season. He averaged 21.4 points and 6.0 assists per game, including a career-high 43-point game against Liberty, and was named to the 2022 NABC All-District First Team and Atlantic Sun First Team, and won Atlantic Sun Newcomer of the Year.

== Professional career ==
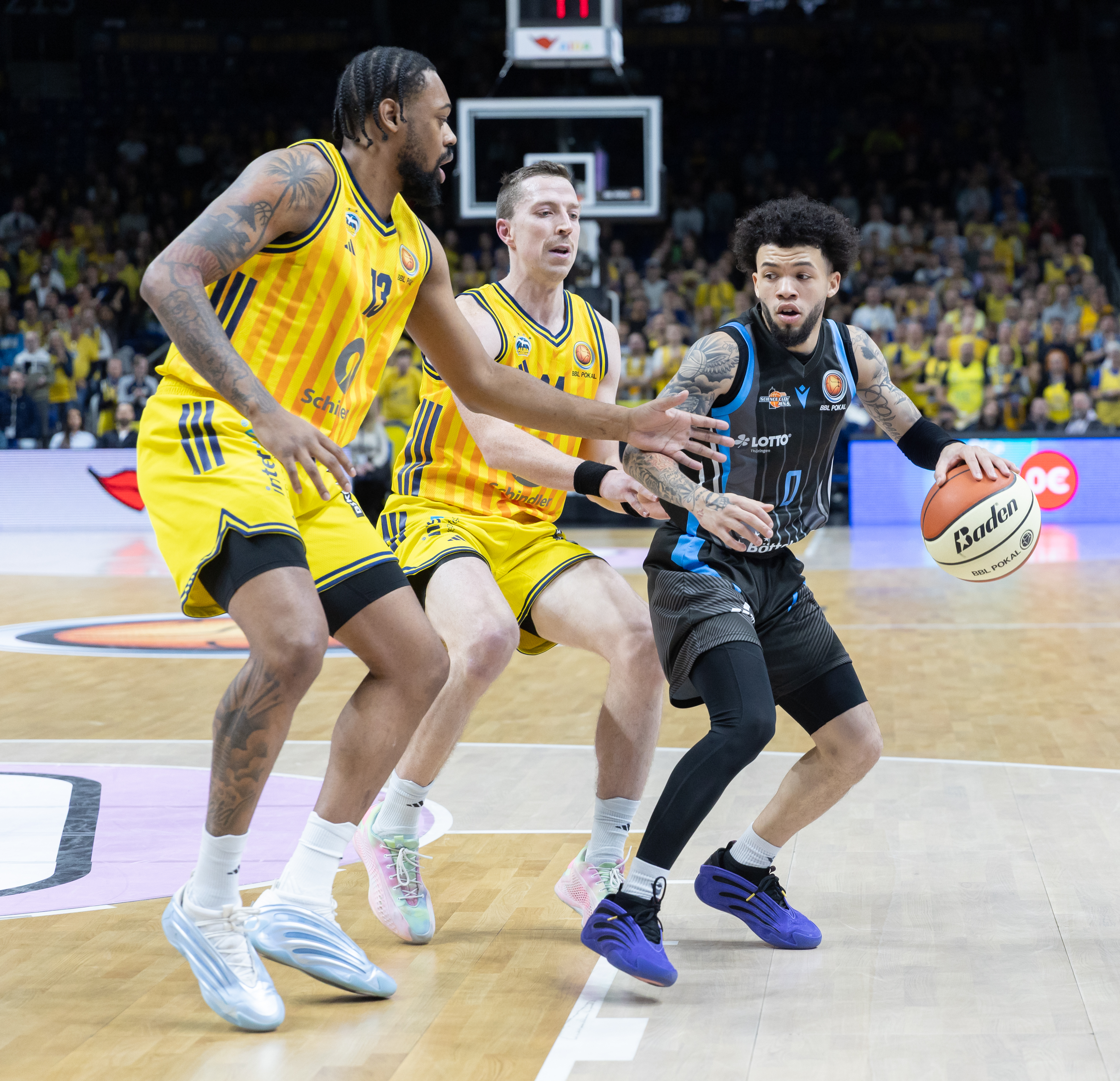
Tavian Dunn-Martin against Science City Jena in 2025.

After college, Dunn-Martin played in the Slovenian Basketball League, LNB Élite, the ABA League, Basketball Bundesliga, the BNXT League, and Türkiye Basketbol Ligi.

=== CEBL (2025 - Present) ===
Dunn-Martin signed with the Montreal Alliance of the Canadian Elite Basketball League (CEBL) in June 2025. On June 6, 2025, he scored a game-high 26 points, as Montreal put up 105 points against the Edmonton Stingers, the most points the franchise had scored in a single game. The following month, on July 7, he set his season high with 30 points, adding 5 rebounds, 3 assists, and 3 steals in a loss to Edmonton, and earlier in the season he had recorded a season-high 12 assists in a game against Ottawa. Over the full regular season, he appeared in 21 games and averaged 18.8 points, 3.2 rebounds, and 6.2 assists. Montreal reached the CEBL playoffs, and Dunn-Martin tied for the team lead with 10 assists in the club's August 14 play-in game. For the season overall, he led the Alliance in total points (395), assists (130), and steals (18), and ranked among the league's three-point leaders.

He moved to the Saskatoon Mamba, where, on July 20, he was recognized as the world's top scorer after putting up 34 points. He went on to record 145 assists and 80 three-pointers in a single season, both single-season CEBL records.
