= Columbus Museum =

American art/regional history museum

The Columbus Museum
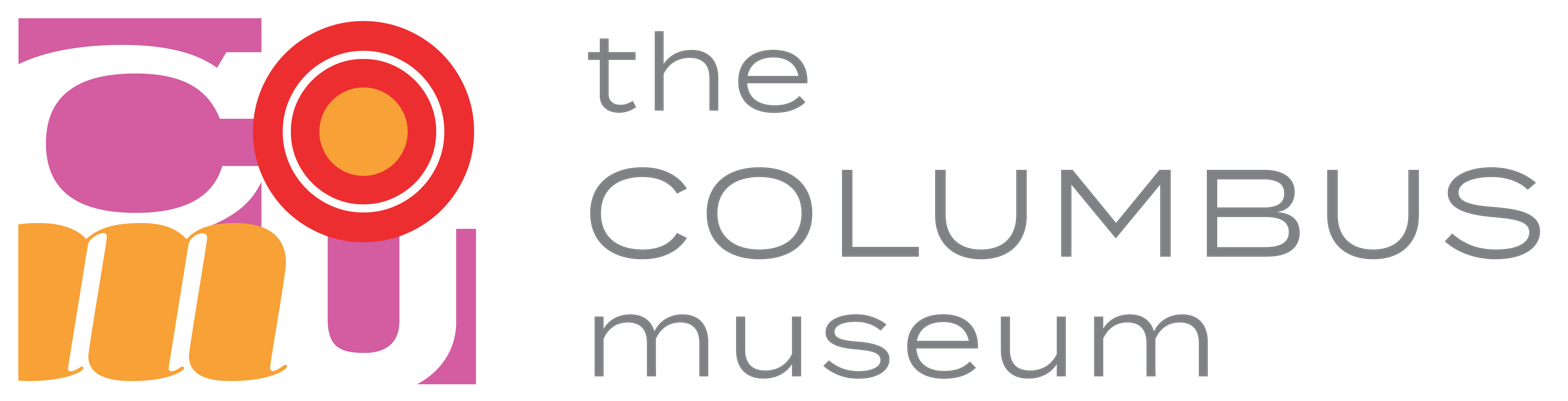

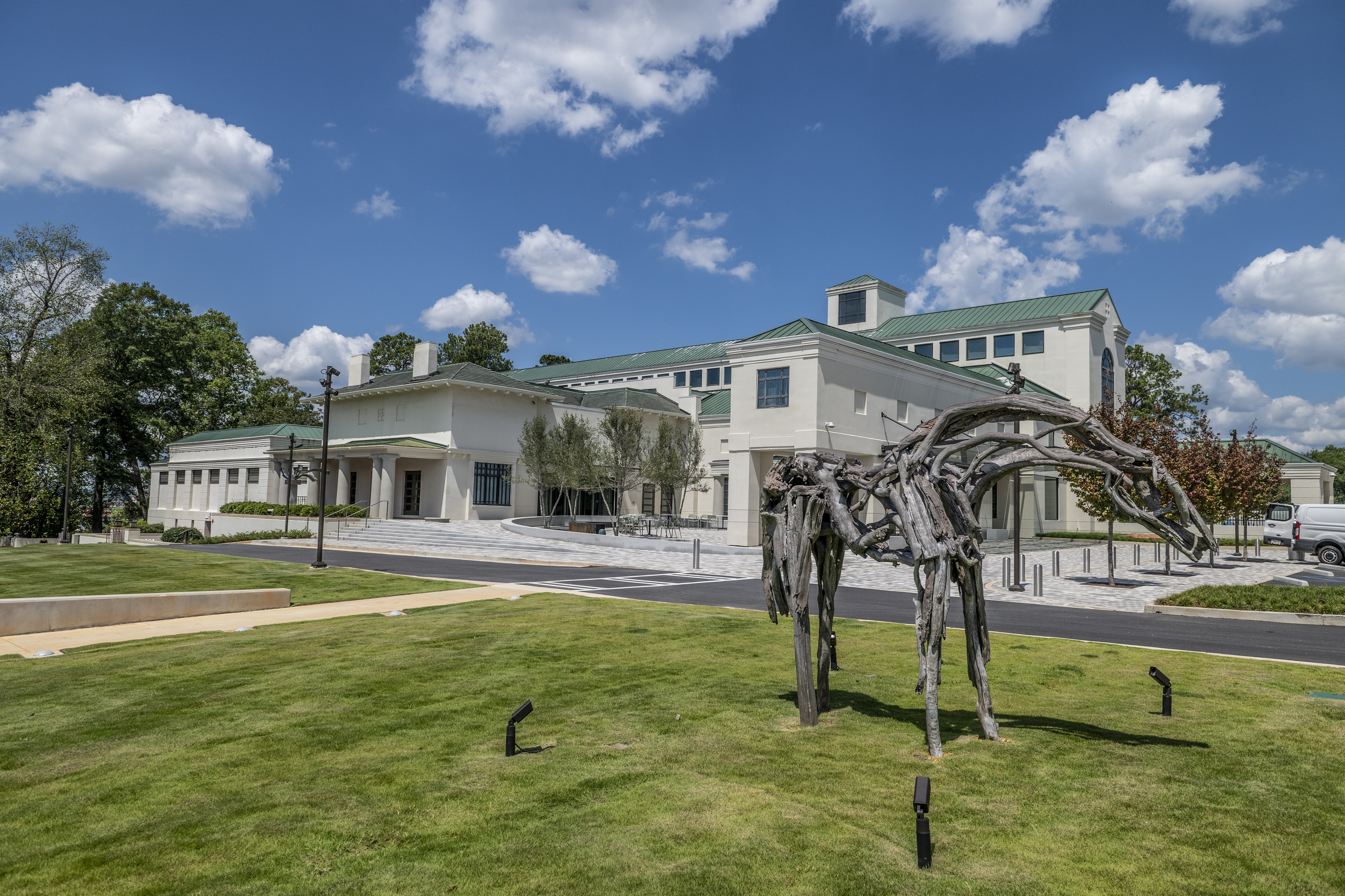
- The Columbus Museum in Columbus, Georgia
- Former name: Columbus Museum of Arts and Crafts
- Established: 1953
- Location: 1251 Wynnton Road, Columbus, Georgia, United States
- Type: Art museum and history museum
- Accreditation: American Alliance of Museums
- Website: comuga.org

The Columbus Museum (COMU) is an art and history museum in Columbus, Georgia. Founded in 1953, the museum has a dual collecting focus on American art and the history and material culture of the Chattahoochee River Valley. Its collections encompass works of art and historical objects representing the region's communities and their connections to broader American history and culture.

The museum presents exhibitions drawn from its permanent collections as well as temporary exhibitions, educational programs, and public events. Education and community engagement have been central to the museum's work, including a longstanding partnership with the Muscogee County School District. The museum offers free general admission.

The museum is located on a historic nine-acre campus in Columbus's Wynnton neighborhood. Its principal building is a 1912 Mediterranean Revival residence that was adapted for museum use. The museum underwent a major expansion in 1989 and a comprehensive transformation between 2022 and 2024 that redesigned galleries and public spaces, improved visitor amenities, restored portions of the historic grounds, and expanded facilities for children, families, collections care, and education.

== History ==
=== Founding and early history ===
The Columbus Museum was established as the Columbus Museum of Arts and Crafts and opened to the public on March 29, 1953. The institution was chartered in 1941 and developed as a community museum with an original emphasis on art, crafts, history, and education.

The museum's home was established on property associated with Columbus businessman and philanthropist W. C. Bradley. Following Bradley's death in 1947, his family donated his nine-acre estate to the people of Columbus for use as a center for culture and education. The property included a Mediterranean Revival residence constructed in 1912. The building was remodeled for museum use, and the museum opened there in 1953.

From its founding, the museum developed a close relationship with the Muscogee County School District. The partnership has included educational programming, school visits, teacher engagement, and other efforts to connect students with art and history.

The museum's original collections encompassed a broad range of art, crafts, historical objects, and material culture. Over time, its collecting emphasis developed into two principal areas: American art and the history of the Chattahoochee Valley. In 1992, the museum formally narrowed its collecting emphasis to American fine and decorative art and cultural history.

=== Expansion and institutional development ===
As the museum's collections and educational activities expanded, its original facilities became increasingly limited. A major capital campaign in the 1980s supported a substantial expansion of the museum, completed in 1989. The project increased the museum's exhibition, educational, collections, and public space from approximately 32,000 to 86,000 square feet.

The museum continued to expand its collections and educational activities in the following decades. Its work increasingly connected American art with the history and culture of the Chattahoochee Valley, including the experiences of the region's Indigenous, African American, and other communities.

=== 2022–2024 transformation ===
In October 2022, the museum closed for a comprehensive renovation, its first major building renovation since 1989. The project followed several years of planning and was undertaken as part of the Reimagining The Columbus Museum capital campaign.

The transformation was intended to modernize the museum while retaining the character of its historic campus and improving the visitor experience. The project included redesigned art and history galleries, expanded exhibition spaces, new visitor orientation areas and amenities, a new entrance plaza, a garden terrace and café, upgraded collections storage and workrooms, and restoration work in the Bradley Olmsted Garden.

The project also expanded facilities for children and families, including a redesigned children's gallery and an adjacent interactive children's garden. The museum reopened to the public on May 4, 2024.

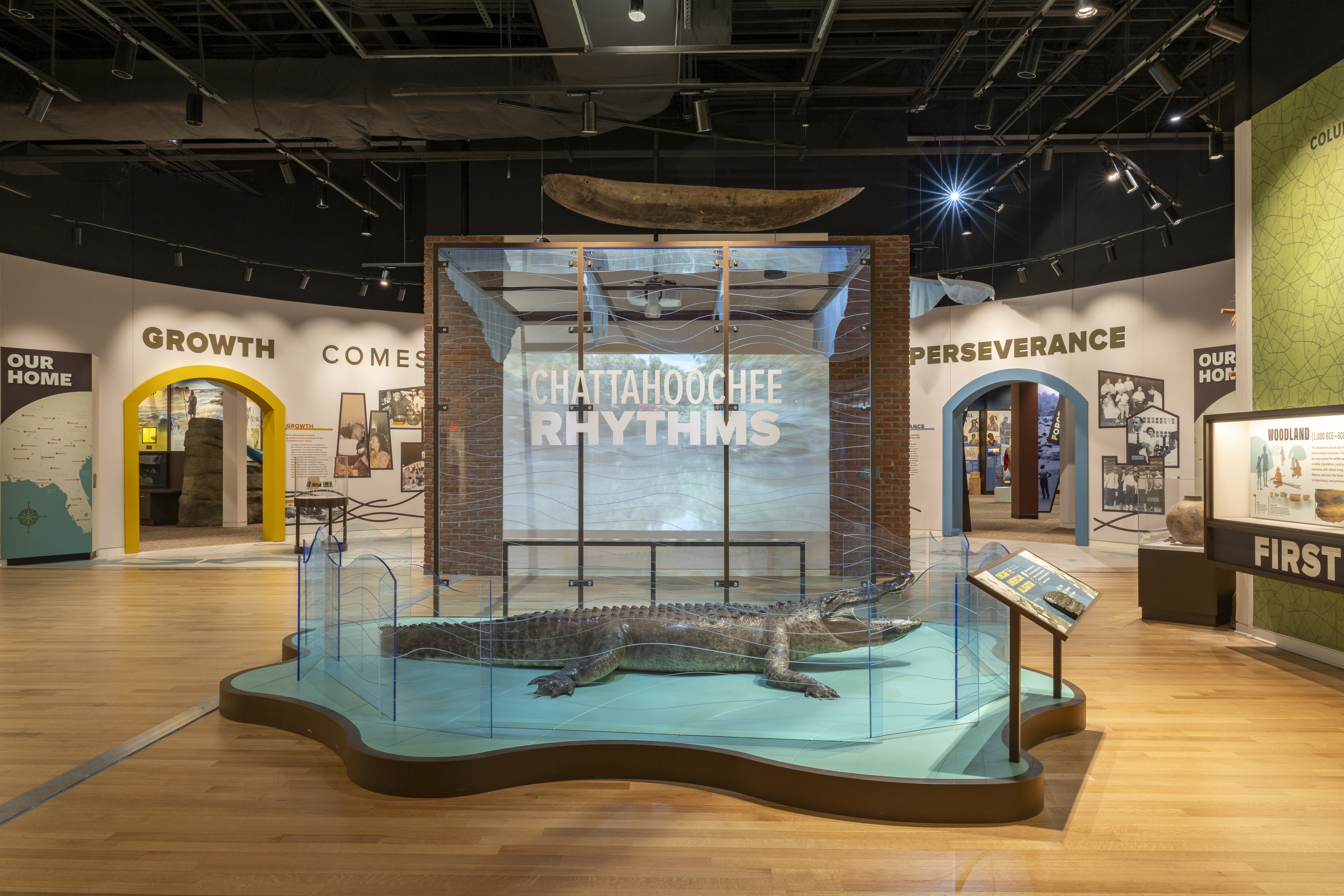
The Columbus Museum History Galleries

== Collections ==
The Columbus Museum maintains two principal collecting areas: American art and the history and material culture of the Chattahoochee Valley. Together, the collections provide a broad view of American artistic production while documenting the people, places, communities, industries, and cultural traditions of the region.

The American art collection encompasses painting, sculpture, works on paper, photography, decorative arts, folk and self-taught art, and contemporary art. Its holdings extend from early American art through modern and contemporary practice and include artists associated with national, regional, and Southern artistic traditions. Artists represented include William Merritt Chase, Sanford Robinson Gifford, Robert Henri, Eastman Johnson, Gilbert Stuart, Paul Manship, Stuart Davis, Robert Motherwell, Lee Krasner, Alice Neel, Romare Bearden, Alma Thomas, Benny Andrews, Radcliffe Bailey, Sam Gilliam, and Amy Sherald, among others.

The regional history collection documents the development of the Chattahoochee Valley and the lives of its communities, extending from archaeological and Indigenous history through settlement, the Civil War and Reconstruction, industrialization, agriculture, commerce, education, transportation, domestic life, textile manufacturing, and the civil rights movement. Holdings include archaeological materials, photographs, maps, documents, clothing, tools, machinery, household objects, commercial materials, and other forms of material culture.

African American art and history form important parts of both collecting areas. The regional history holdings document African American community life, labor, education, family and domestic life, institutions, and participation in the civil rights movement. The museum established the Fund for African American Art in 2014 to support acquisitions by significant African American artists, including emerging and established artists.

The Alma Thomas Society is a collector-driven group that supports the Fund for African American Art and participates in selecting works for the museum's permanent collection. Since its active collecting began in 2018, the Society has supported acquisitions by artists including Augusta Savage, Laura Wheeler Waring, Therman Statom, and Kenneth Moore.

The museum's collection includes Amy Sherald's What's different about Alice is that she has the most incisive way of telling the truth (2017), acquired through the Fund for African American Art. The work has subsequently traveled to exhibitions including Amy Sherald: American Sublime at the San Francisco Museum of Modern Art, Whitney Museum of American Art, Baltimore Museum of Art, and High Museum of Art.

The museum frequently interprets its art and history collections in relation to one another. Exhibitions and educational programs may use works of art, historical objects, photographs, documents, and other materials together to explore subjects such as race, labor, industry, migration, domestic life, community, identity, and social change.

Works from the museum's collections have also been lent to museums and cultural institutions in the United States and internationally for exhibitions of American art and individual artists. The museum's documented loan activity includes institutions such as the High Museum of Art, Whitney Museum of American Art, Georgia Museum of Art, Frist Art Museum, and Columbia University's Wallach Art Gallery.

== Exhibitions ==
The Columbus Museum presents exhibitions drawn from its permanent collections as well as temporary exhibitions developed by the museum or presented in partnership with other museums, collections, foundations, artists, universities, and cultural organizations. Its exhibition program encompasses American art, regional history, African American art and history, decorative arts, photography, contemporary art, and interdisciplinary subjects.

The museum has developed exhibitions in collaboration with other institutions. Notable examples include Alma W. Thomas: Everything Is Beautiful, which was co-organized with the Chrysler Museum of Art and received support from the Andy Warhol Foundation for the Visual Arts and the Wyeth Foundation for American Art.

The museum also presents exhibitions and collection-related projects through partnerships with universities, libraries, and other community institutions, extending its collections and exhibitions to audiences beyond its primary galleries.

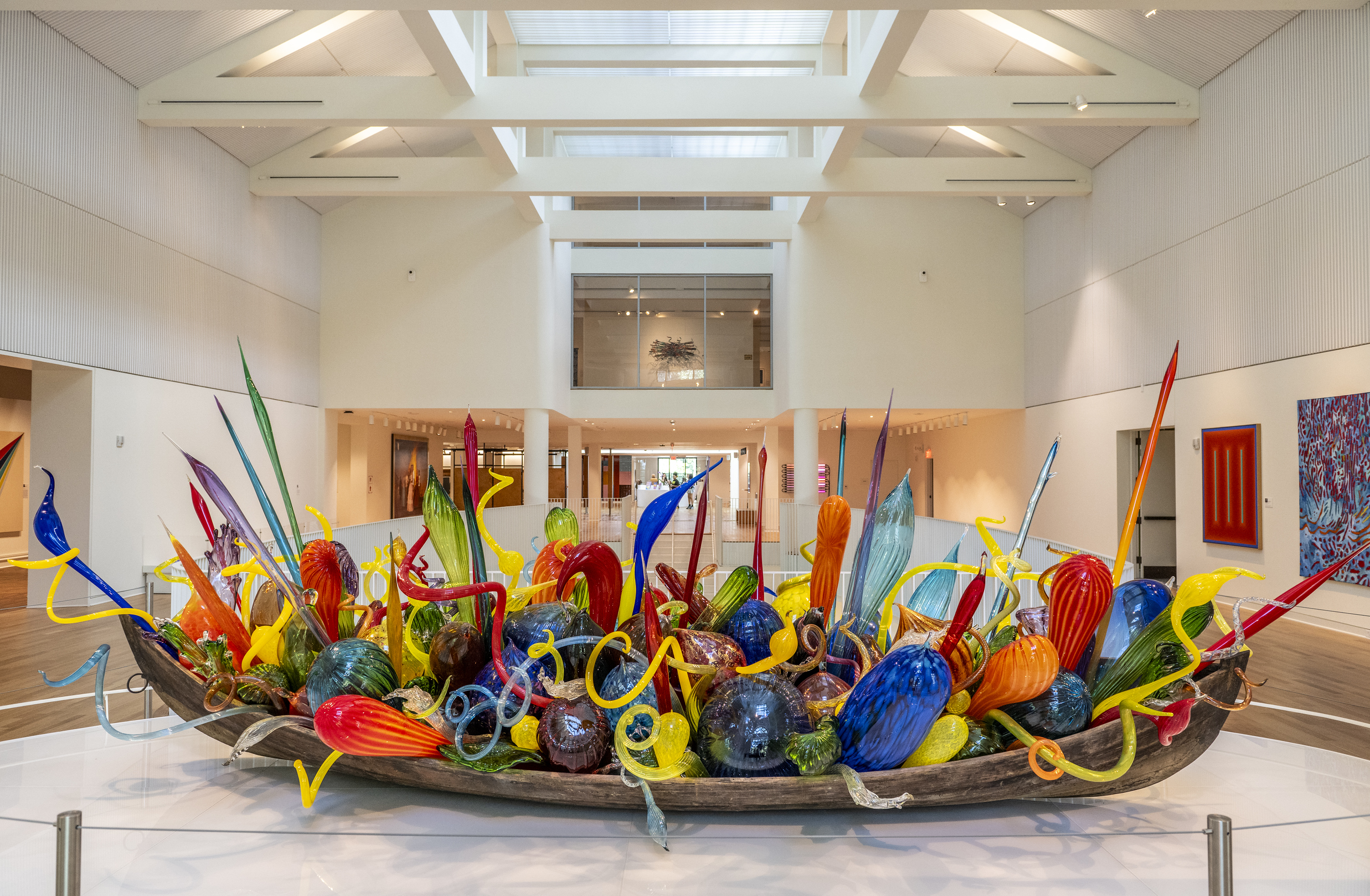
The galleries of The Columbus Museum following its 2024 transformation

== Education and community engagement ==
Education has been a central part of The Columbus Museum's mission since its founding. The museum provides opportunities for students, teachers, families, children, teenagers, adults, and lifelong learners to engage with works of art, historical objects, exhibitions, and the museum's collections.

=== Muscogee County School District partnership ===
The museum has a longstanding relationship with the Muscogee County School District, working with the district to provide opportunities for students, teachers, and administrators to engage with American art and regional history.

The Columbus Museum lobby and visitor orientation area

The partnership includes school visits, educational programs, teacher professional development, classroom resources, outreach, and collaborative educational initiatives. Museum educators also work with schools and community organizations beyond the museum's campus.

The museum's educational partnerships extend beyond Muscogee County to schools, universities, libraries, and community organizations throughout the Chattahoochee Valley and surrounding region.

=== Children, families, and teenagers ===
The museum provides educational experiences for children and families that combine engagement with works from the collection, gallery exploration, hands-on activities, and creative learning.

Teen education emphasizes participation, leadership, and direct experience with museum work. The museum's Teen Exhibition Council provides high school juniors and seniors with hands-on experience in museum careers including curatorial work, marketing, and education.

=== Adult and lifelong learning ===
Adult and lifelong learning at the museum includes lectures, gallery discussions, workshops, classes, tours, and other opportunities to engage with American art, regional history, artists, exhibitions, and cultural subjects. The museum also provides professional development and resources for educators.

=== Access and community outreach ===
The Columbus Museum has maintained a commitment to free general admission and to making educational and cultural opportunities broadly accessible. Community outreach includes partnerships with schools, libraries, universities, civic organizations, and other community groups.

The museum's public programming provides opportunities for visitors to engage with art and history through exhibitions, talks, tours, workshops, family activities, and other forms of participation.

== Building and grounds ==
The Columbus Museum occupies a nine-acre campus in Columbus's Wynnton neighborhood. The principal museum building was constructed in 1912 as a Mediterranean Revival residence.

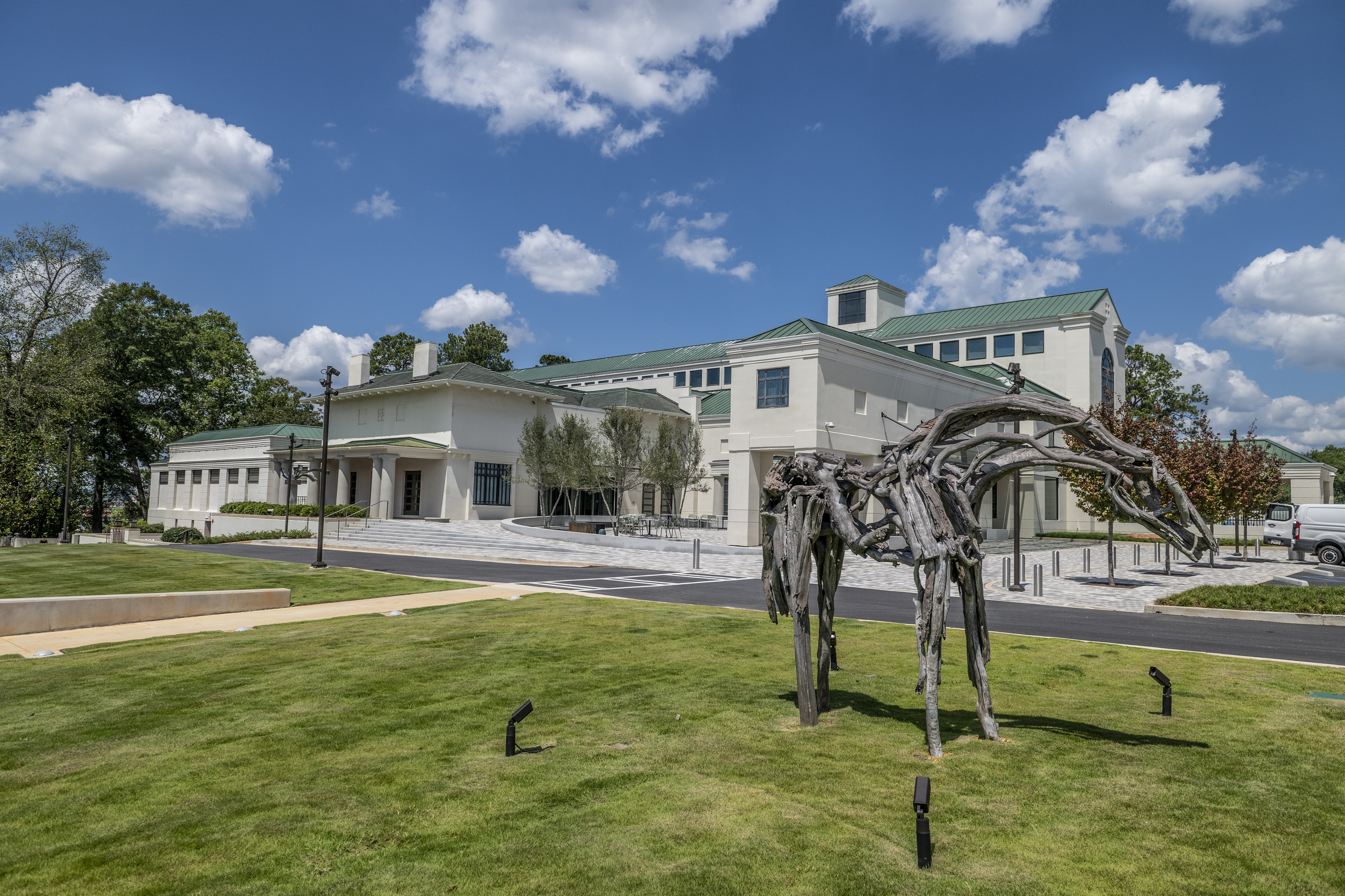
The Columbus Museum in Columbus, Georgia

The campus includes the Bradley Olmsted Garden, designed in the 1920s by the Olmsted Brothers firm for W. C. Bradley. The garden includes naturalistic plantings, winding paths, a pool house, and a grotto. The National Park Service identifies the Bradley property as an Olmsted-designed estate and describes the garden as one of the firm's most significant and substantial residential landscape designs in Georgia.

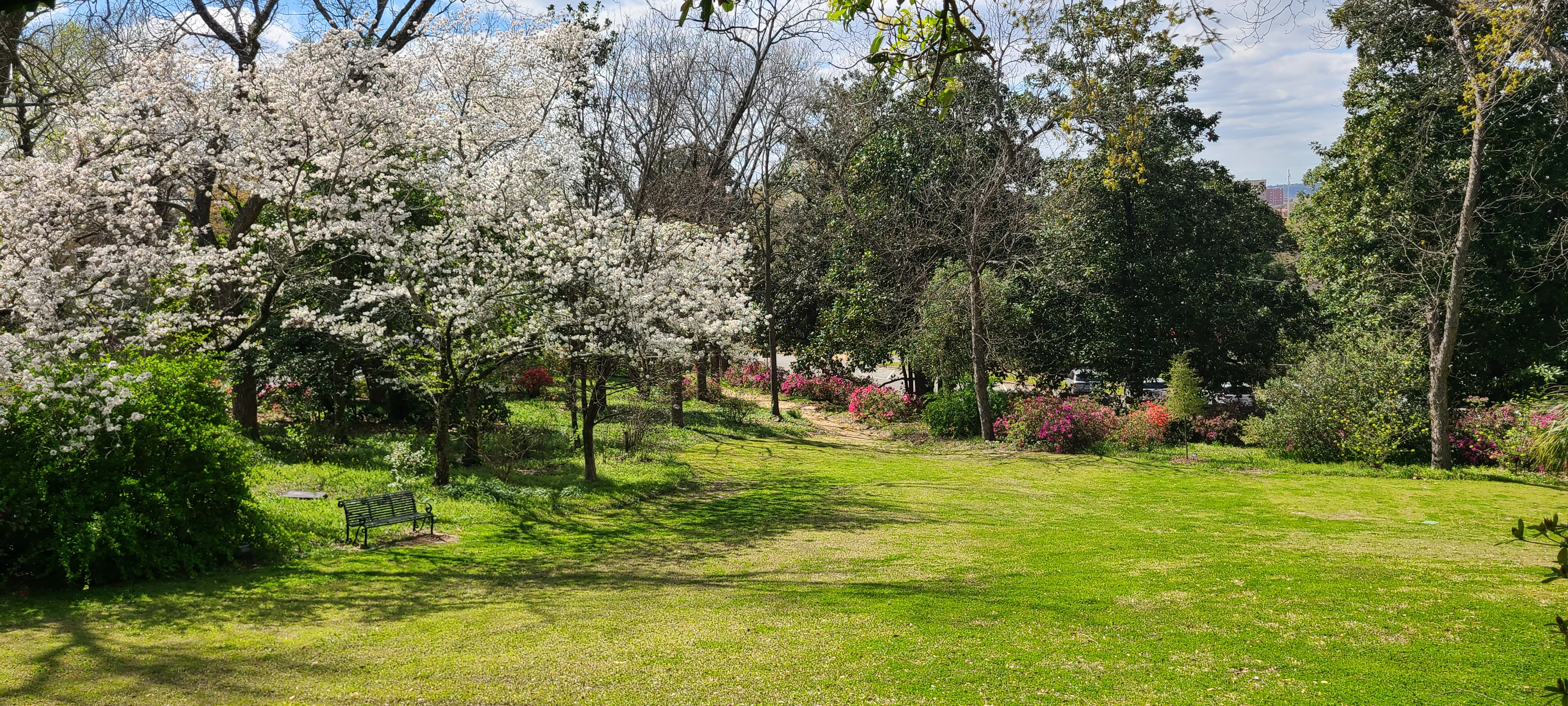
The Bradley Olmsted Garden

The museum's physical facilities have developed through several major phases, including the 1989 expansion and the comprehensive transformation completed in 2024.

The 2024 project redesigned the museum's galleries and visitor spaces while preserving the historic campus. It included redesigned history galleries and art exhibition spaces, new visitor orientation areas, an entrance plaza, a garden terrace and café, improved collections storage and workrooms, and restoration of portions of the Bradley Olmsted Garden.

The project also created a redesigned children's gallery and adjacent children's garden, expanding the museum's facilities for children and families.

The Columbus Museum Children's Gallery

== Recognition ==
The Columbus Museum is accredited by the American Alliance of Museums. The Alliance included The Columbus Museum among museums receiving reaccreditation in 2025.

The museum has received recognition from regional and national museum organizations for exhibitions, educational initiatives, and its facilities. Its exhibitions have received awards from the Georgia Association of Museums and the Southeastern Museums Conference.

Following its 2024 reopening, The Columbus Museum was named the Best New Museum for 2025 by USA Today's 10Best Readers' Choice Awards. The museum's 2024 renovation also received a Historic Columbus Preservation Award, and the reinstallation of its permanent history galleries received a Georgia Association of Museums Exhibition Award.

== See also ==
- American art
- African-American art
- History of Columbus, Georgia
- Chattahoochee River
- Muscogee County School District
- Alma Thomas
- Amy Sherald
- List of museums in Georgia
