= Ken Moore (cricketer) =

English cricketer

Kenneth Francis Moore (4 January 1940 – 23 March 1998) was an English cricketer. He was a right-handed batsman and a left-arm medium-fast bowler who played for Essex in 1961. He was born in Croydon and died at the age of 58 in Mallorca.

Moore made just one first-class appearance, against Cambridge University. He scored just two runs, from eleventh in the batting order, though Essex ran out winners by an innings margin.

Moore made his debut in the Second XI Championship seven weeks later, and continued to play in the competition until the end of the 1963 season, when he quit the game.
