= York Preparatory Academy =

Public charter school in South Carolina

Coordinates: 34°56′39″N 81°0′15″W

York Preparatory Academy is a public charter school authorized by the South Carolina Public Charter School District. Opened in 2010, York Preparatory Academy serves many students in York County, South Carolina from grades K-12 with some students from other nearby counties. York Preparatory Academy is located in Rock Hill, South Carolina in a suburban-rural transition area. In February 2014, York Preparatory Academy became the first public charter school in South Carolina to issue a non-profit bond through private investments, allowing the school to take ownership of the 42-acre campus, which has four large buildings, sports fields, and parking. The $30 million bond came to fruition in part due to the strong enrollment profile of the school.

The current enrollment at the school is approximately 1500 students in grades K-12. York Preparatory Academy is one of the largest brick-and mortar public charter schools in the Carolinas.

== Administration ==
Richard Shepard currently serves as the High School Principal with Rebecca Kick and Jennifer McGugan serving as Middle School and Elementary Principals, respectively.

== Notable alumni ==
- D.J. Burns (born 2000), basketball player in the Israeli Basketball Premier League
