= Ken Moore (American football) =

American football player (1917–2003)

No. 55, 35
- Position: Lineman

Personal information
- Born: May 11, 1917; Clarksburg, West Virginia, U.S.
- Died: December 1, 2003 (aged 86); Jupiter, Florida, U.S.
- Listed height: 6 ft 0 in (1.83 m)
- Listed weight: 212 lb (96 kg)

Career information
- High school: Washington Irving (Clarksburg, West Virginia)
- College: West Virginia Wesleyan (1935–1938)
- NFL draft: 1939: undrafted

Career history
- Cincinnati Bengals (1939)*; New York Giants (1939–1940); → Jersey City Giants (1939)
- * Offseason or practice squad member only

Awards and highlights
- Second-team All-AA (1939)

Career NFL statistics
- Games played: 7 or 8
- Stats at Pro Football Reference

Kenneth Charles Moore (May 11, 1917 – December 1, 2003) was an American professional football player. A lineman, he played college football for the West Virginia Wesleyan Bobcats and appeared in seven or eight games for the New York Giants of the National Football League (NFL). He also had stints with the Cincinnati Bengals of the American Professional Football Association (APFA) and the Jersey City Giants of the American Association (AA).

== Early life and college ==
Moore was born on May 11, 1917, in Clarksburg, West Virginia. He attended Washington Irving High School and was their only alumnus to play in the National Football League (NFL). He attended West Virginia Wesleyan College and began playing for the Bobcats as a freshman in 1935, lettering. He began as a center and also played defensive end as a sophomore in 1936. He was one of the players who assisted in "bringing fame" to West Virginia Wesleyan that year by defeating Duquesne.

As a junior, Moore played both center and tackle and began receiving All-America attention. The Raleigh Register described him as the "obstreperous iron man center" and "a champion in the making ... [he] has been the spearhead of the Methodist line so far and much dependence [is] placed on his dependable shoulders ... [p]robably if a record of individual tackles made thus far had been kept, the ubiquitous Clarksburg, W. Va., product would topple that of his teammates, so consistently has been his brand of ball."

Moore was nicknamed "Cave Man Kenny". He was moved to quarterback to begin the 1938 season to give more "beef" to the backfield, but then returned to the line as a guard. He missed time due to injury that year. The Hinton Daily News summarized his college football career as follows: "The fast-charging, hard-hitting tactics of the ubiquitous Moore established [him as one of] Wesleyan's ... outstanding centers the school has turned out during the past three decades." The paper noted that he was selected to All-State teams, was mentioned as an All-American, and was chosen to various All-Opponent (Note: All-Opponent teams were composed of the best players from those that a certain team faced in a season.) teams. In addition to football, Moore also played basketball at West Virginia Wesleyan.

== Professional sports career ==
Moore signed with the Cincinnati Bengals of the American Professional Football Association (APFA) following his college career, but did not appear in any games for them. He then signed with the New York Giants of the National Football League (NFL) as an undrafted free agent and was sent to their farm team, the Jersey City Giants of the American Association; he appeared in nine games, eight as a starter, and was named second-team All-AA at right guard. He was promoted to New York in October 1940 and appeared in seven or eight games (Note: Sources conflict.) for the team in the 1940 NFL season. He became a free agent prior to the 1941 season and did not sign with another team.

== Military service, career in law enforcement, and later life ==
Moore served in the United States Navy. He was a special agent in the Federal Bureau of Investigation (FBI) for 25 years and was for 10 years the head of security at Calder Race Course. He lived in Miami for a time after his football career and spent the last 22 years of his life in Port St. Lucie, Florida. He was a member of the Elks Lodge, Moose Lodge, Veterans of Foreign Wars, Sandpiper Bay Golf Club and American Legion. Moore died in Jupiter, Florida, at age 86, on December 1, 2003.
