= Poca High School =

Coordinates: 38.458583°N 81.816389°W

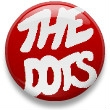

Location
- 1 Dot Way; Poca, WV 25159

Information
- Type: Public high school
- Motto: Once a Dot Always a Dot!
- Established: 1922
- School district: Putnam County Schools
- Grades: 9-12
- Enrollment: 432 (2023-2024)
- Campus type: Suburban
- Colors: Red and grey
- Nickname: The Dots
- Rivals: Nitro High School
- Website: phs.putnamschools.com

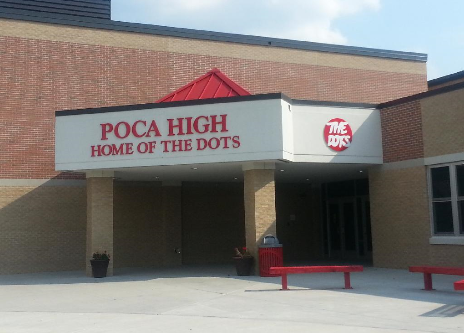
Current Poca High School

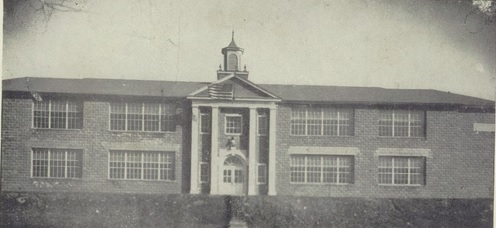
1926 Poca High School

Poca High School, originally named "Pocatalico District High School", is a high school in Poca, West Virginia, United States. It serves the easternmost portion of Putnam County and is a part of the Putnam County Schools.

The school is rated as having 601 students for athletic purposes, placing it in class AA. The school colors are red and grey. Pocatalico is a Native American word meaning "river of fat deer." Its original mascot was an American Indian riding upon a white horse. "Legend" passed down through the years tells of a Native American, Pocatalico, who was killed at the mouth of the Pocatalico River. The current nickname, thought to be unique in the nation and for which the school is mildly famous, is the "Dots", and has been featured by ESPN and Sports Illustrated in several lists of best school mascots. "The Dot" mascot was first referenced in 1928, during a storming football game, when a reporter exclaimed, "They look like a bunch of red polka dots running around the field!" The name stuck and is still currently used.

== History ==
Poca High School first opened its doors in September 1922 using a small white schoolhouse located on a hillside between Bancroft and Black Betsy, West Virginia. The school then moved to a much larger building overlooking Poca's Main Street in 1926. In 1970, the school relocated to its current building on the outskirts of town. Over the next decade, Poca High School's then-modern 1970 design was replicated to build new buildings for Hurricane and Winfield High Schools, also located in Putnam County. Thus, while subsequent renovations and additions over the years have introduced unique character, the core sections of three of Putnam County's four high schools share nearly identical floor plans. Poca High School itself received significant renovation and addition in 2011-12 and again in 2023-24. Following the high school's move to its current building, the former 1926-era building was used as Poca Junior High (later Middle) School from 1970 until 2012; that building was demolished in 2013 after the construction of a new building for the middle school.

The first graduating class consisted of eleven students. The first school paper, The School Echo, was published in January 1924. Three years later, the first annual yearbook, The Pocatalico, was published. Since then, an issue of The Pocatalico has been released every year.

== Arts and athletics ==
Poca High School fields competitive athletic teams and music ensembles, including marching band and show choir, which have earned various state, regional and national recognitions, awards and championships. The team's nickname is Poca Dots, or "The Dots", and was selected by ESPN as the number one sports nickname in the country. Its show choir, "Visual Volume," is a 14-time West Virginia Music Educators Association (WVMEA), state show choir champion.

== Notable alumni ==
- Isaac McKneely (2022), basketball player
