= Washington Irving High School (West Virginia) =

High school in Clarksburg, West Virginia

Coordinates: 39°16′42″N 80°20′33″W

Washington Irving Middle School was a public secondary school located in Clarksburg, West Virginia. The school operated as a high school from 1914 until 1995; Between 1996 and 2025, the school operated as a middle school. The school was closed as students and staff were consolidated into Liberty Middle School for the 2025-26 school year.

As of November 2025, the Harrison County Board of Education has put the building up for auction.

Better known as WI, the school's mascot was the Hilltopper. The school's colors were blue and gold. The school was named after Washington Irving, a 19th-century American author and historian.

== History ==
When WI first opened in 1914, it was an all White school; it continued to be segregated until the 1956, when the end of segregation resulted in the permanent closure of Kelly Miller High School, which was Clarksburg's black school.

== Notable alumni ==
Notable WIHS alumni included:

- Mike Patrick, ESPN broadcaster
- Ken Moore, NFL player
- Sam Ellis, the former manager for singer Meat Loaf.

== Athletics ==
WI competed in team and individual competitions sanctioned by the West Virginia Secondary School Activities Commission and competed regionally in the (WV) Big Ten Conference.

=== State Championships ===
- Cheerleading: 1989
- Girls' Basketball: 1983, 1984
