= Miami Hurricanes men's basketball statistical leaders =

The logo of the Miami Hurricanes, the collegiate athletic program of the University of Miami

The Miami Hurricanes men's basketball statistical leaders are individual statistical leaders of the Miami Hurricanes men's basketball program in various categories, including points, rebounds, assists, steals, and blocks. Within those areas, the lists identify single-game, single-season, and career leaders. The Hurricanes represent the University of Miami in the NCAA's Atlantic Coast Conference.

Miami began competing in intercollegiate basketball in 1927. However, the school's record book does not generally list records from before the 1950s, as records from before this period are often incomplete and inconsistent. Since scoring was much lower in this era, and teams played much fewer games during a typical season, it is likely that few or no players from this era would appear on these lists anyway.

The NCAA did not officially record assists as a stat until the 1983–84 season, and blocks and steals until the 1985–86 season, but Miami's record books includes players in these stats before these seasons. These lists are updated through the end of the 2019–20 season.

== Scoring ==
Career
Rk	Player	Points	Seasons
1	Rick Barry	2,298	1962–63 1963–64 1964–65
2	Eric Brown	2,270	1985–86 1986–87 1987–88 1988–89
3	Don Curnutt	2,006	1967–68 1968–69 1969–70
4	Isaiah Wong	1,866	2019–20 2020–21 2021–22 2022–23
5	Darius Rice	1,865	2000–01 2001–02 2002–03 2003–04
6	Robert Hite	1,717	2002–03 2003–04 2004–05 2005–06
7	Tim James	1,713	1995–96 1996–97 1997–98 1998–99
8	Jack McClinton	1,702	2006–07 2007–08 2008–09
9	Durand Scott	1,650	2009–10 2010–11 2011–12 2012–13
10	Dennis Burns	1,594	1985–86 1986–87 1987–88 1988–89

Season
Rk	Player	Points	Season
1	Rick Barry	973	1964–65
2	Rick Barry	870	1963–64
3	Eric Brown	765	1988–89
4	Don Curnutt	709	1969–70
5	Don Curnutt	662	1968–69
	Malik Reneau	662	2025–26
7	Kameron McGusty	658	2021–22
8	Don Curnutt	635	1967–68
9	Jack McClinton	617	2008-09
10	Isaiah Wong	598	2022–23

Single game
Rk	Player	Points	Season	Opponent
1	Rick Barry	59	1964–65	Rollins
2	Rick Barry	55	1964–65	Tampa
3	Rick Barry	54	1964–65	Florida Southern
4	Rick Barry	52	1963–64	Jacksonville
5	Rick Barry	51	1964–65	Tampa
	Rick Barry	51	1964–65	Oklahoma City
7	Rick Barry	50	1964–65	Houston
	Rick Barry	50	1963–64	Rollins
9	Mike McCoy	48	1962–63	Rollins
10	Sy Chadroff	47	1951–52	Rollins

== Rebounds ==
Career
Rk	Player	Rebounds	Seasons
1	Rick Barry	1,274	1962–63 1963–64 1964–65
2	Willie Allen	916	1968–69 1969–70 1970–71
3	Harry Manushaw	914	1958–59 1959–60 1960–61
4	Tonye Jekiri	901	2012–13 2013–14 2014–15 2015–16
5	Dwyane Collins	879	2006-07 2007–08 2008-09 2009-10
6	Mike McCoy	857	1960–61 1961–62 1962–63
7	Tim James	856	1995–96 1996–97 1997–98 1998–99
8	Eric Brown	855	1985–86 1986–87 1987–88 1988–89
9	Reggie Johnson	842	2009–10 2010–11 2011–12 2012–13
10	Anthony King	824	2003–04 2004–05 2005–06 2006–07 2007–08

Season
Rk	Player	Rebounds	Season
1	Rick Barry	475	1964–65
2	Rick Barry	448	1963–64
3	Harry Manushaw	372	1958–59
4	Norchad Omier	371	2022–23
5	Tonye Jekiri	366	2014–15
6	Rick Barry	351	1962–63
7	Mike McCoy	350	1962–63
8	Reggie Johnson	347	2010–11
9	Mike McCoy	336	1961–62
10	Bill Soens	330	1966–67

Single game
Rk	Player	Rebounds	Season	Opponent
1	Rick Barry	29	1964–65	Oklahoma City
2	Wayne Canaday	28	1968–69	Bucknell
3	Rick Barry	27	1964–65	Rollins
	Harry Manushaw	27	1958–59	Florida State
5	Harry Manushaw	26	1958–59	Morehead St.
6	Rusty Parker	25	1967–68	Florida State
	Rick Barry	25	1962–63	Cornell
8	Rick Barry	24	1964–65	Houston
	Rick Barry	24	1964–65	Tampa
	Wayne Beckner	24	1962–63	Rollins
	Harry Manushaw	24	1958–59	Toronto

== Assists ==
Career
Rk	Player	Assists	Seasons
1	Vernon Jennings	520	1996–97 1997–98 1998–99 1999–00
2	Kevin Norris	493	1994–95 1995–96 1996–97 1997–98
3	John Salmons	429	1998–99 1999–00 2000–01 2001–02
4	Kevin Presto	412	1985–86 1986–87 1987–88 1988–89
5	Durand Scott	404	2009–10 2010–11 2011–12 2012–13
6	Thomas Hocker	384	1987–88 1988–89 1989–90
7	Anthony Harris	330	2003–04 2004–05 2005–06 2006–07
8	Michael Gardner	319	1991–92 1992–93 1993–94
9	Steven Edwards	312	1992–93 1993–94 1994–95 1995–96
10	Jaquan Newton	308	2014–15 2015–16 2016–17 2017–18

Season
Rk	Player	Assists	Season
1	Vernon Jennings	218	1999–00
2	Tre Donaldson	201	2025–26
3	John Salmons	195	2001–02
4	Charlie Moore	171	2021-22
5	Vernon Jennings	167	1998–99
6	Shane Larkin	164	2012–13
7	Angel Rodriguez	158	2015–16
8	Michael Gardner	154	1992–93
9	Kevin Norris	142	1996–97
10	Thomas Hocker	139	1989–90

Single game
Rk	Player	Assists	Season	Opponent
1	Michael Gardner	14	1992–93	Pittsburgh
2	John Salmons	13	2001–02	Notre Dame
	Bryan Hughes	13	1985–86	The Citadel
4	Tre Donaldson	12	2025–26	UL Monroe
	Tre Donaldson	12	2025–26	Florida International
	Vernon Jennings	12	1999–00	Bethune-Cookman
	Vernon Jennings	12	1998–99	Pittsburgh
	Thomas Hocker	12	1989–90	Florida State
	Thomas Hocker	12	1989–90	Tulane
10	Tre Donaldson	11	2025–26	Southern Miss
	Angel Rodriguez	11	2015–16	Duke
	John Salmons	11	2001–02	St. John's
	Vernon Jennings	11	1999–00	Notre Dame
	Vernon Jennings	11	1998–99	Syracuse
	Kevin Norris	11	1997–98	Florida Atlantic
	Michael Gardner	11	1992–93	Syracuse
	Jerome Scott	11	1990–91	St. Joseph's (Pa.)
	Kevin Presto	11	1987–88	Alabama State

== Steals ==
Career
Rk	Player	Steals	Seasons
1	Kevin Norris	208	1994–95 1995–96 1996–97 1997–98
2	Vernon Jennings	199	1996–97 1997–98 1998–99 1999–00
3	John Salmons	192	1998–99 1999–00 2000–01 2001–02
4	Robert Hite	187	2002–03 2003–04 2004–05 2005–06
	Jerome Scott	187	1988–89 1989–90 1990–91 1991–92
6	Jake Morton	167	1988–89 1989–90 1990–91 1991–92 1992–93
7	Durand Scott	166	2009–10 2010–11 2011–12 2012–13
8	Kevin Presto	154	1985–86 1986–87 1987–88 1988–89
9	Anthony Lawrence II	144	2015–16 2016–17 2017–18 2018–19
10	Mike Simmons	141	1998–99 2000–01 2001–02 2002–03

Season
Rk	Player	Steals	Season
1	Jerome Scott	77	1991–92
2	Charlie Moore	75	2021–22
	Vernon Jennings	75	1999–00
4	Shane Larkin	71	2012–13
5	Jerome Scott	70	1990-91
6	Kevin Norris	68	1997-98
7	Kameron McGusty	67	2021–22
8	Jordan Miller	63	2021-22
9	Robert Hite	61	2003–04
10	Vernon Jennings	60	1998–99

Single game
Rk	Player	Steals	Season	Opponent
1	Jerome Scott	9	1990–91	FIU
2	Jordan Miller	7	2021–22	Virginia
	Charlie Moore	7	2021–22	Duke
	Vernon Jennings	7	1999–00	West Virginia

== Blocks ==
Career
Rk	Player	Blocks	Seasons
1	Constantin Popa	263	1991–92 1992–93 1993–94 1994–95
2	Tim James	224	1995–96 1996–97 1997–98 1998–99
3	Anthony King	219	2003–04 2004–05 2005–06 2006–07 2007–08
4	James Jones	192	1999–00 2000–01 2001–02 2002–03
5	Julian Gamble	132	2008–09 2009–10 2010–11 2012–13
6	Tonye Jekiri	126	2012–13 2013–14 2014–15 2015–16
7	Tito Horford	125	1986–87 1987–88
8	Dennis Burns	123	1985–86 1986–87 1987–88 1988–89
9	Elton Tyler	114	1997–98 1998–99 1999–00 2001–02
10	Reggie Johnson	113	2009–10 2010–11 2011–12 2012–13

Season
Rk	Player	Blocks	Season
1	Anthony King	86	2004–05
2	Constantin Popa	85	1992–93
3	Tito Horford	80	1987–88
4	James Jones	78	2001–02
5	Anthony King	65	2005–06
	Tim James	65	1998–99
7	Tim James	64	1996–97
	Constantin Popa	64	1991–92
9	Julian Gamble	63	2012–13
10	Constantin Popa	59	1993–94

Single game
Rk	Player	Blocks	Season	Opponent
1	Anthony King	13	2004–05	Florida Atlantic
2	James Jones	8	2001–02	FIU
	Tim James	8	1995–96	West Virginia
	Constantin Popa	8	1992–93	Florida Atlantic
5	Anthony King	7	2007–08	Marist
	James Jones	7	2002–03	North Carolina
	James Jones	7	2000–01	Florida Atlantic
	Constantin Popa	7	1994–95	St. John's
	Constantin Popa	7	1992–93	Beth.-Cookman
	Tito Horford	7	1987–88	South Carolina
