= Tre Donaldson =

American basketball player (born 2003)

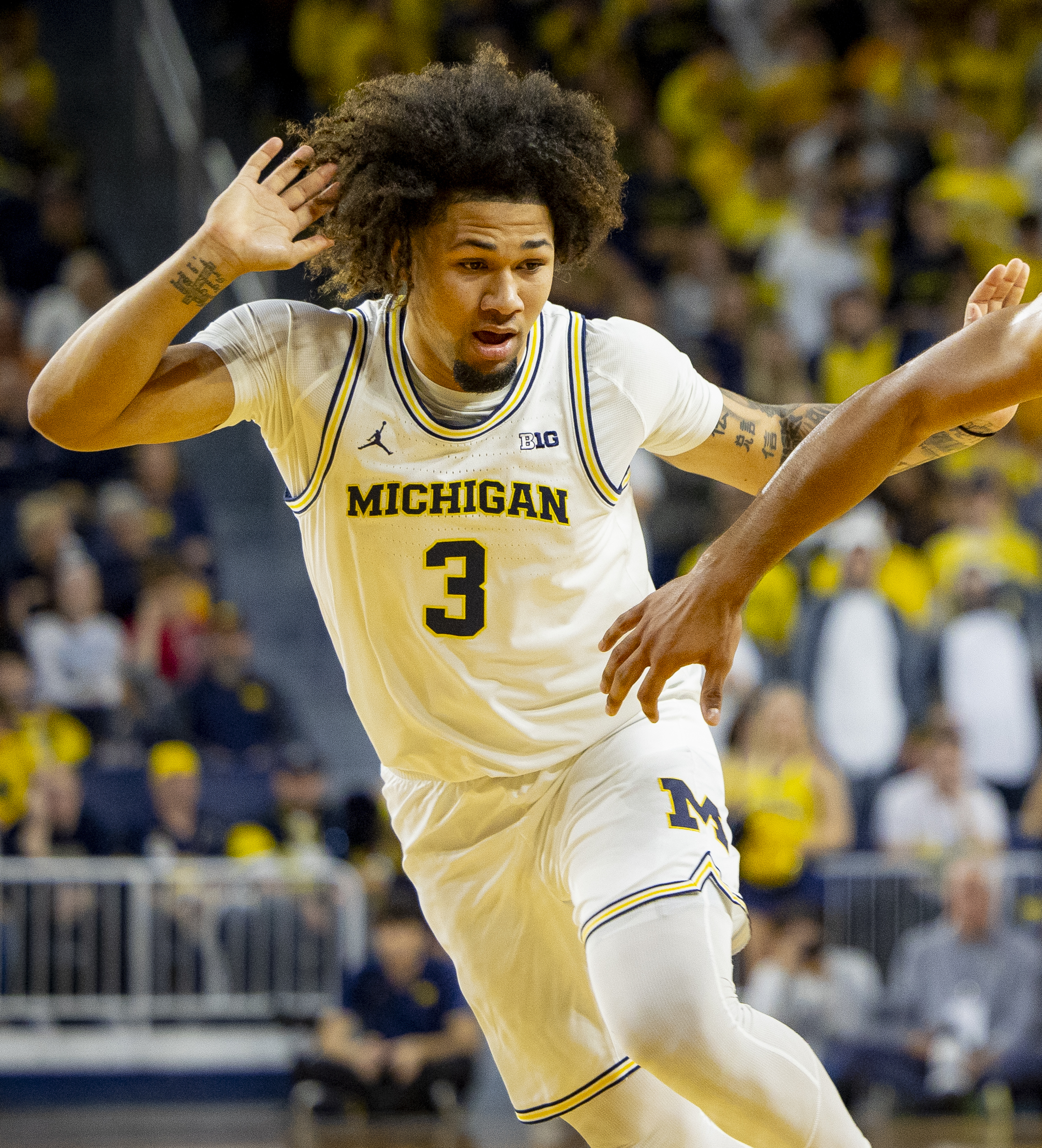
- Donaldson with the 2024–25 Michigan Wolverines

No. 24 – Miami Heat
- Position: Point guard
- League: NBA

Personal information
- Born: December 11, 2003 (age 22) Tallahassee, Florida, U.S.
- Listed height: 6 ft 1 in (1.85 m)
- Listed weight: 200 lb (91 kg)

Career information
- High school: Florida State University School (Tallahassee, Florida)
- College: Auburn (2022–2024); Michigan (2024–2025); Miami (Florida) (2025–2026)
- NBA draft: 2026: undrafted
- Playing career: 2026–present

Career history
- 2026–present: Miami Heat
- 2026–present: →Sioux Falls Skyforce

Career highlights
- Second-team All-ACC (2026)
- Stats at NBA.com
- Stats at Basketball Reference

Rhodney "Tre" Donaldson III (born December 11, 2003) is an American basketball player for the Miami Heat of the National Basketball Association (NBA), on a two-way contract with the Sioux Falls Skyforce of the NBA G League. He played college basketball for the Auburn Tigers, Michigan Wolverines and Miami Hurricanes.

== High school career ==
Donaldson attended Florida State University School in Tallahassee, Florida, where he was a standout two-sport athlete, playing both basketball and football. In football, Donaldson played quarterback as well as defensive back, and was rated as a four-star top 300 player in the country, the No. 23 safety and No. 32 overall prospect in the state of Florida according to 247Sports. As a junior in 2020, he completed 68 percent of his passes for 1,765 yards and 15 touchdowns, and was named the Tallahassee Democrat Big Bend Offensive Player of the Year.

In basketball, as a freshman he averaged 10.0 points, 4.1 rebounds, 4.0 assists and 2.2 steals. As a sophomore, he averaged 11.3 points, 4.2 rebounds, 4.0 assists and 1.8 steals. As a junior, he averaged 11.1 points, 3.9 rebounds, 3.6 assists and 1.8 steals. As a senior, he averaged 16.4 points, 5.3 rebounds, 3.7 assists and 2.4 steals. That season, he led the Seminoles to a 24–7 record and was named the Florida Dairy Farmers Association Player of the Year. He also won the Florida Class 3A State Championship, scoring a team-high 22 points, five rebounds, three assists and three steals, defeating Riviera Prep 68–67, winning their first state championship in 59 years.

== College career ==
=== Auburn ===
On August 19, 2021, Donaldson committed to play college football and college basketball for Auburn University. Despite being recruited primarily as a football prospect, Donaldson opted to only play for Bruce Pearl and the Auburn basketball program. During the 2022–23 season, as a freshman, he appeared in 32 games and averaged 2.5 points, 1.4 rebounds and 1.2 assists in 10.5 minutes off the bench. In the first round of the 2023 NCAA Division I men's basketball tournament against Iowa, he scored 11 points in 13 minutes off the bench, including three three-point field goals. This was his second career game scoring in double figures.

During the 2023–24 season, as a sophomore, he appeared in all 35 games starting ten times and averaged 6.7 points, 2.4 rebounds and 3.2 assists in 19.2 minutes per game. After the conclusion of the 2023–24 season, Donaldson entered the NCAA transfer portal.

=== Michigan ===
On April 21, 2024, Donaldson transferred to the University of Michigan to play for head coach Dusty May and the Wolverines. As a junior, he earned the starting point guard position to open the season for the Wolverines. On November 4, in his first game with Michigan against Cleveland State, he scored 16 points and seven assists. In the next game against Wake Forest, he scored ten points and nine rebounds. On December 7, Donaldson scored a then career-high 18 points against Iowa. On December 29 against Western Kentucky, he scored 12 points and a career-high 11 rebounds, recording his first career double-double.

On January 7, 2025, against UCLA, Donaldson had 20 points on a career-high six three-point shots, adding six rebounds and seven assists. On January 27 against Penn State, he scored a career-high 21 points and tied both his career-highs with seven assists and four steals. He scored the last seven points in the final minute of the game to lead a comeback win for Michigan, including hitting a three-point shot with 24 seconds left and two free throws to secure the game with four seconds remaining. On March 15, in the 2025 Big Ten tournament semifinal against Maryland, he had 12 points with a career-high nine assists, including scoring the game-winning shot. With Michigan down by one point with 5.3 seconds remaining, Donaldson went the length of the court, scoring a left-handed layup with 0.4 seconds remaining. In the final, he had 11 points and eight assists as Michigan became Big Ten champions with a win against Wisconsin.

On April 1, 2025, Donaldson entered the NCAA transfer portal for the second time in as many years. He started all 37 games for the Wolverines and averaged career-highs in points, rebounds and assists.

=== Miami ===
On April 3, 2025, Donaldson transferred to the University of Miami to play for the Hurricanes. On January 7, 2026, he scored 21 points and six assists against Wake Forest. In the next game against Georgia Tech, he scored a career-high 27 points and ten assists, for his fifth double-double of the season. He became the first Miami player to score at least 20 points and ten assists in a game since Isaiah Wong in 2022. During the 2025–26 season, as a senior, he averaged 24.0 points and 8.0 assists, and was named the Atlantic Coast Conference Player of the Week on January 12, 2026. Following the regular season, he was named second team All-ACC.

== Professional career ==
After going undrafted in the 2026 NBA draft, Donaldson signed a one-year, two-way contract with the Miami Heat on June 24, 2026. On June 30, 2026, he was announced as a member of the 2026 NBA Summer League roster for the Heat. He made his Summer League debut on July 3, during the California Classic against the San Antonio Spurs and scored two points and two assists. On July 5, against the Los Angeles Lakers, he scored 11 points on 4-of-4 shooting, along with two rebounds and four assists.

== Career statistics ==
Legend
GP	Games played	GS	Games started	MPG	Minutes per game
FG%	Field goal percentage	3P%	3-point field goal percentage	FT%	Free throw percentage
RPG	Rebounds per game	APG	Assists per game	SPG	Steals per game
BPG	Blocks per game	PPG	Points per game	**Bold**	Career high

=== College ===
Year	Team	GP	GS	MPG	FG%	3P%	FT%	RPG	APG	SPG	BPG	PPG
2022–23	Auburn	32	0	10.5	.384	.406	.550	1.4	1.2	0.7	0.0	2.5
2023–24	Auburn	35	10	19.3	.471	.412	.784	2.4	3.2	0.8	0.0	6.7
2024–25	Michigan	37	37	31.1	.433	.375	.690	3.5	4.1	1.0	0.1	11.3
**Career**		**104**	**47**	**20.8**	**.439**	**.388**	**.695**	**2.5**	**2.9**	**0.8**	**0.1**	**7.1**

== Personal life ==
Donaldson was born to Rhodney Donaldson II and Stacie Symonds, and has two sisters, Mackenzie Oliver and Preslee Donaldson. His mother played softball at Florida State University from 1993 to 1995. His father played basketball at Troy University from 1993 to 1997 and ranks 11th all-time in career scoring with 1,363 points for the Trojans.

== See also ==
- Miami Hurricanes men's basketball statistical leaders
