= 2022–23 Miami Hurricanes men's basketball team =

Sports team season

2022–23 Miami Hurricanes men's basketball

ACC regular season co–champions

NCAA tournament, Final Four
- Conference: Atlantic Coast Conference

Ranking
- Coaches: No. 3
- AP: No. 16
- Record: 29–8 (15–5 ACC)
- Head coach: Jim Larrañaga (12th season)
- Associate head coach: Bill Courtney
- Assistant coaches: D.J. Irving; Kotie Kimble
- Home arena: Watsco Center

2022–23 ACC men's basketball standings
	Conf.				Overall
Team	W		L	PCT	W		L	PCT
No. 16 Miami (FL)	15	–	5	.750	29	–	8	.784
No. 14 Virginia	15	–	5	.750	25	–	8	.758
Clemson	14	–	6	.700	23	–	11	.676
No. 12 Duke †	14	–	6	.700	27	–	9	.750
Pittsburgh	14	–	6	.700	24	–	12	.667
NC State	12	–	8	.600	23	–	11	.676
North Carolina	11	–	9	.550	20	–	13	.606
Wake Forest	10	–	10	.500	19	–	14	.576
Syracuse	10	–	10	.500	17	–	15	.531
Boston College	9	–	11	.450	16	–	17	.485
Virginia Tech	8	–	12	.400	19	–	15	.559
Florida State	7	–	13	.350	9	–	23	.281
Georgia Tech	6	–	14	.300	15	–	18	.455
Notre Dame	3	–	17	.150	11	–	21	.344
Louisville	2	–	18	.100	4	–	28	.125
† 2023 ACC tournament winner Rankings from AP poll

The 2022–23 Miami Hurricanes men's basketball team represented the University of Miami during the 2022–23 NCAA Division I men's basketball season. The Hurricanes were led by twelfth-year head coach Jim Larrañaga, and played their home games at the Watsco Center on the university's campus in Coral Gables, Florida as members of the Atlantic Coast Conference (ACC).

They finished the season 29–8 and 15–5 in ACC play ACC play, to finish in a tie for first place and clinch a share of the regular season title. This was the team's second ACC regular season title in program history, with the first coming in 2013. As the first seed in the ACC tournament, they earned a bye to the quarterfinals, where they defeated ninth seed Wake Forest before losing to fourth seed and eventual champion Duke in the semifinals. The received an at-large bid to the NCAA Tournament, where they were the fifth seed in the Midwest Region. They defeated twelfth seed Drake in the first round, fourth seed Indiana in the second round, first seed Houston in the Sweet Sixteen and second seed Texas to qualify for the first Final Four in program history. In the Final Four, they lost to eventual champions UConn to end their season.

== Previous season ==
The Hurricanes finished the 2021–22 season 26–11, 14–6 in ACC play to finish in fourth place. In the ACC Tournament, they defeated Boston College in the quarterfinals before losing to eventual runners-up Duke in the semifinals. They received an at-large bid to the NCAA Tournament, where they defeated USC, Auburn and Iowa State to advance to the first Elite Eight in school history, where they lost to the eventual national champion, Kansas.

== Offseason ==
=== Departures ===
Departures
Name	Number	Pos.	Height	Weight	Year	Hometown	Reason for departure
Charlie Moore	3	G	5'11"	180	GS senior	Chicago, IL	Graduated
Rodney Miller Jr.	14	C	7'0"	235	GS senior	Laurelton, NY	Graduated
Sam Waardenburg	21	F	6'10"	225	GS senior	Auckland, NZ	Graduated
Deng Gak	22	F	6'11"	220	RS junior	Sydney, Australia	Signed to play professionally in Australia with Ballarat Miners
Kameron McGusty	23	G	6'5"	190	GS senior	Katy, TX	Graduated

=== Incoming transfers ===
Incoming transfers
Name	Number	Pos.	Height	Weight	Year	Hometown	Previous school
Norchad Omier	15	F	6'7"	232	Sophomore	Bluefields, Nicaragua	Arkansas State
Nijel Pack	24	G	6'0"	180	Sophomore	Indianapolis, IN	Kansas State

=== 2022 recruiting class ===
College recruiting
Name	Hometown	School	Height	Weight	Commit date
A.J. Casey #7 SF	Chicago, IL	Whitney Young High School	6 ft 7 in (2.01 m)	200 lb (91 kg)	Oct 15, 2021
A.J. Casey #7 SF	Recruit ratings: Rivals: 247Sports: ESPN: (85)				
Christian Watson #20 SF	Washington, DC	St. John's College High School	6 ft 6 in (1.98 m)	180 lb (82 kg)	Sep 1, 2021
Christian Watson #20 SF	Recruit ratings: Rivals: 247Sports: ESPN: (82)				
Favour Aire #24 C	Forestville, MD	Bishop McNamara High School	6 ft 9 in (2.06 m)	215 lb (98 kg)	Nov 10, 2021
Favour Aire #24 C	Recruit ratings: Rivals: 247Sports: ESPN: (82)				
Danilo Jovanovich #31 PF	Greenfield, WI	Whitnall High School	6 ft 7 in (2.01 m)	200 lb (91 kg)	Oct 15, 2021
Danilo Jovanovich #31 PF	Recruit ratings: Rivals: 247Sports: ESPN: (80)				
Overall recruit ranking: Rivals: 48
Note: In many cases, Scout, Rivals, 247Sports, On3, and ESPN may conflict in their listings of height and weight.; In these cases, the average was taken. ESPN grades are on a 100-point scale.; Sources: "Miami 2022 Basketball Commitments". Rivals.; "Miami Hurricanes". ESPN.; "2022 Team Ranking". Rivals.

== Roster ==
2022–23 Miami Hurricanes men's basketball team
Players
Coaches

Pos.	#	Name	Height	Weight	Year	Hometown
F	0	AJ Casey	6 ft 8 in (2.03 m)	205 lb (93 kg)	Fr	Chicago, IL
F	1	Anthony Walker	6 ft 9 in (2.06 m)	215 lb (98 kg)	RS Jr	Baltimore, MD
G	2	Isaiah Wong	6 ft 3 in (1.91 m)	185 lb (84 kg)	RS Jr	Piscataway, NJ
G	3	Christian Watson	6 ft 7 in (2.01 m)	200 lb (91 kg)	Fr	Lanham, MD
G	4	Bensley Joseph	6 ft 1 in (1.85 m)	195 lb (88 kg)	So	Arlington, MA
G	5	Harlond Beverly	6 ft 5 in (1.96 m)	195 lb (88 kg)	RS So	Detroit, MI
G	10	Filippos Gkogkos (W)	6 ft 3 in (1.91 m)	193 lb (88 kg)	RS Jr	Athens, Greece
G	11	Jordan Miller	6 ft 7 in (2.01 m)	195 lb (88 kg)	RS Sr	Middleburg, VA
C	12	Favour Aire	6 ft 10 in (2.08 m)	212 lb (96 kg)	Fr	Ekpoma, Nigeria
G	13	Jakai Robinson	6 ft 4 in (1.93 m)	200 lb (91 kg)	RS Fr	Ossining, NY
F	15	Norchad Omier	6 ft 7 in (2.01 m)	232 lb (105 kg)	RS So	Bluefields, Nicaragua
F	23	Danilo Jovanovich	6 ft 8 in (2.03 m)	205 lb (93 kg)	Fr	Milwaukee, WI
G	24	Nijel Pack	6 ft 0 in (1.83 m)	180 lb (82 kg)	RS So	Indianapolis, IN
F	32	Thomas Oosterbroek (W)	6 ft 7 in (2.01 m)	235 lb (107 kg)	So	Amsterdam, Netherlands
G	55	Wooga Poplar	6 ft 5 in (1.96 m)	195 lb (88 kg)	So	Philadelphia, PA

Head coach

- Jim Larrañaga (Providence)

Assistant coach(es)

- Bill Courtney (Bucknell)
- D.J. Irving (Boston University)
- Kotie Kimble (Coastal Carolina)

Legend

- (C) Team captain
- (S) Suspended
- (I) Ineligible
- (W) Walk-on
- Injured
- Current redshirt

Roster

== Schedule and results ==
Date time, TV	Rank^{#}	Opponent^{#}	Result	Record	High points	High rebounds	High assists	Site (attendance) city, state
Exhibition
Oct 30, 2022*; 2:00 p.m., ACCNX/ESPN+		IUP	W 89–55		19 – Tied	7 – Tied	6 – Pack	Watsco Center (750); Coral Gables, FL
Regular season
Nov 7, 2022*; 7:30 p.m., ACCNX/ESPN+		Lafayette	W 67–54	1–0	16 – Tied	15 – Omier	4 – Wong	Watsco Center (4,789); Coral Gables, FL
Nov 11, 2022*; 7:00 p.m., ACCNX/ESPN+		UNC Greensboro	W 79–65	2–0	19 – Miller	11 – Omier	4 – Tied	Watsco Center (4,831); Coral Gables, FL
Nov 15, 2022*; 7:00 p.m., ACCNX/ESPN+		Florida A&M	W 87–61	3–0	21 – Omier	9 – Miller	7 – Wong	Watsco Center (4,339); Coral Gables, FL
Nov 19, 2022*; 4:00 p.m., ESPNews		vs. Providence; Hall of Fame Tip Off Semifinals	W 74–64	4–0	19 – Omier	12 – Omier	3 – Wong	Mohegan Sun Arena (8,756); Uncasville, CT
Nov 20, 2022*; 1:00 p.m., ESPN		vs. Maryland; Hall of Fame Tip Off Championship	L 70–88	4–1	22 – Wong	6 – Omier	3 – Wong	Mohegan Sun Arena (5,022); Uncasville, CT
Nov 23, 2022*; 6:30 p.m., ACCN		St. Francis Brooklyn	W 79–56	5–1	23 – Pack	10 – Omier	6 – Joseph	Watsco Center (3,612); Coral Gables, FL
Nov 27, 2022*; 5:00 p.m., ESPNU		at UCF	W 66–64	6–1	16 – Pack	13 – Omier	4 – Joseph	Addition Financial Arena (5,354); Orlando, FL
Nov 30, 2022*; 7:15 p.m., ESPNU		Rutgers; ACC–Big Ten Challenge	W 68–61	7–1	17 – Tied'	10 – Miller	4 – Wong	Watsco Center (5,668); Coral Gables, FL
Dec 4, 2022; 1:00 p.m., ACCN		at Louisville	W 80–53	8–1 (1–0)	14 – Miller	5 – Tied	5 – Pack	KFC Yum! Center (11,811); Louisville, KY
Dec 7, 2022*; 7:00 p.m., ACCRSN		Cornell	W 107–105	9–1	36 – Wong	12 – Omier	6 – Wong	Watsco Center (4,235); Coral Gables, FL
Dec 10, 2022; 2:00 p.m., ACCRSN		NC State	W 80–73	10–1 (2–0)	25 – Miller	11 – Omier	8 – Wong	Watsco Center (4,880); Coral Gables, FL
Dec 17, 2022*; 12:00 p.m., ACCRSN	No. 25	Saint Francis (PA)	W 91–76	11–1	22 – Wong	9 – Omier	10 – Wong	Watsco Center (4,029); Coral Gables, FL
Dec 20, 2022; 8:30 p.m., ACCN	No. 22	No. 6 Virginia	W 66–64	12–1 (3–0)	24 – Wong	8 – Omier	5 – Wong	Watsco Center (7,257); Coral Gables, FL
Dec 30, 2022; 2:00 p.m., ACCN	No. 14	at Notre Dame	W 76–65	13–1 (4–0)	21 – Pack	8 – Miller	4 – Beverly	Joyce Center (6,105); Notre Dame, IN
Jan 4, 2023; 7:00 p.m., ACCRSN	No. 12	at Georgia Tech	L 70–76	13–2 (4–1)	17 – Tied	8 – Omier	3 – Tied	McCamish Pavilion (4,203); Atlanta, GA
Jan 11, 2023; 7:00 p.m., ESPNU	No. 16	Boston College	W 88–72	14–2 (5–1)	22 – Wong	13 – Omier	5 – Tied	Watsco Center (4,353); Coral Gables, FL
Jan 14, 2023; 12:00 p.m., ACCRSN	No. 16	at NC State	L 81–83 ^{OT}	14–3 (5–2)	25 – Wong	13 – Omier	2 – Miller	PNC Arena (16,819); Raleigh, NC
Jan 16, 2023; 7:00 p.m., ACCN	No. 17	Syracuse	W 82–78	15–3 (6–2)	16 – Tied	16 – Omier	7 – Miller	Watsco Center (6,765); Coral Gables, FL
Jan 21, 2023; 12:00 p.m., ESPN	No. 17	at Duke	L 66–68	15–4 (6–3)	19 – Miller	14 – Omier	2 – Tied	Cameron Indoor Stadium (9,314); Durham, NC
Jan 24, 2023; 7:00 p.m., ESPNU	No. 20	at Florida State	W 86–63	16–4 (7–3)	18 – Tied	11 – Omier	5 – Pack	Donald L. Tucker Civic Center (9,182); Tallahassee, FL
Jan 28, 2023; 4:00 p.m., ESPNU	No. 20	at Pittsburgh	L 68–71	16–5 (7–4)	18 – Miller	9 – Omier	4 – Miller	Peterson Events Center (12,508); Pittsburgh, PA
Jan 31, 2023; 7:00 p.m., ESPNU	No. 23	Virginia Tech	W 92–83	17–5 (8–4)	21 – Omier	8 – Omier	5 – Miller	Watsco Center (5,834); Coral Gables, FL
Feb 4, 2023; 3:00 p.m., ACCN	No. 23	at No. 20 Clemson	W 78–74	18–5 (9–4)	20 – Pack	7 – Tied	3 – Tied	Littlejohn Coliseum (9,000); Clemson, SC
Feb 6, 2023; 7:00 p.m., ESPN	No. 19	Duke	W 81–59	19–5 (10–4)	17 – Omier	10 – Omier	6 – Pack	Watsco Center (7,972); Coral Gables, FL
Feb 11, 2023; 7:00 p.m., ACCN	No. 19	Louisville	W 93–85	20–5 (11–4)	22 – Pack	7 – Omier	6 – Miller	Watsco Center (6,540); Coral Gables, FL
Feb 13, 2023; 7:00 p.m., ESPN	No. 15	at North Carolina	W 80–72	21–5 (12–4)	24 – Miller	11 – Miller	4 – Wong	Dean Smith Center (19,907); Chapel Hill, NC
Feb 18, 2023; 2:00 p.m., ACCRSN	No. 15	Wake Forest	W 96–87	22–5 (13–4)	27 – Wong	8 – Omier	4 – Pack	Watsco Center (7,972); Coral Gables, FL
Feb 21, 2023; 7:00 p.m., ESPNU	No. 13	at Virginia Tech	W 76–70	23–5 (14–4)	17 – Omier	14 – Omier	3 – Miller	Cassell Coliseum (8,925); Blacksburg, VA
Feb 25, 2023; 4:00 p.m., ESPN2	No. 13	Florida State	L 84–85	23–6 (14–5)	21 – Miller	8 – Omier	5 – Joseph	Watsco Center (7,972); Coral Gables, FL
Mar 4, 2023; 6:00 p.m., ACCN	No. 16	No. 25 Pittsburgh	W 78–76	24–6 (15–5)	18 – Poplar	13 – Omier	4 – Wong	Watsco Center (7,972); Coral Gables, FL
ACC tournament
Mar 9, 2023; 12:00 p.m., ESPN	(1) No. 14	vs. (9) Wake Forest; Quarterfinals	W 74–72	25–6	18 – Miller	10 – Omier	5 – Tied	Greensboro Coliseum (13,920); Greensboro, NC
Mar 10, 2023; 7:00 p.m., ESPN2	(1) No. 14	vs. (4) No. 21 Duke; Semifinals	L 78–85	25–7	22 – Wong	7 – Miller	4 – Poplar	Greensboro Coliseum (15,316); Greensboro, NC
NCAA tournament
March 17, 2023*; 7:25 pm, TBS	(5 MW) No. 16	vs. (12 MW) Drake; First Round	W 63–56	26–7	21 – Pack	14 – Omier	2 – Tied	MVP Arena (13,989); Albany, NY
March 19, 2023*; 8:40 p.m., TNT	(5 MW) No. 16	vs. (4 MW) No. 21 Indiana; Second Round	W 85–69	27–7	27 – Wong	17 – Omier	5 – Joseph	MVP Arena (13,984); Albany, NY
March 24, 2023*; 7:15 p.m., CBS	(5 MW) No. 16	vs. (1 MW) No. 2 Houston; Sweet Sixteen	W 89–75	28–7	26 – Pack	13 – Omier	4 – Miller	T-Mobile Center (17,429); Kansas City, MO
March 26, 2023*; 5:05 p.m., CBS	(5 MW) No. 16	vs. (2 MW) No. 5 Texas; Elite Eight	W 88–81	29–7	27 – Miller	9 – Omier	4 – Poplar	T-Mobile Center (17,530); Kansas City, MO
April 1, 2023*; 8:49 p.m., CBS	(5 MW) No. 16	vs. (4 W) No. 10 UConn; Final Four	L 59–72	29–8	15 – Wong	10 – Miller	3 – Miller	NRG Stadium (73,860); Houston, TX
*Non-conference game. ^{#}Rankings from AP Poll. (#) Tournament seedings in parentheses. MW=Midwest. W=West. All times are in Eastern Time.

== Rankings ==
Ranking movements Legend: ██ Increase in ranking ██ Decrease in ranking RV = Received votes
	Week																			
Poll	Pre	1	2	3	4	5	6	7	8	9	10	11	12	13	14	15	16	17	18	Final
AP	RV	RV	RV	RV	RV	25	22	14	12	16	17	20	23	19	15	13	16	14	16	Not released
Coaches	RV	RV	RV	RV	RV	25	22	16	12	15	16	19	21	20	13	11	15	13	15	3

*AP does not release post-NCAA Tournament rankings.
