= Charlie Moore (basketball) =

American basketball player (born 1998)

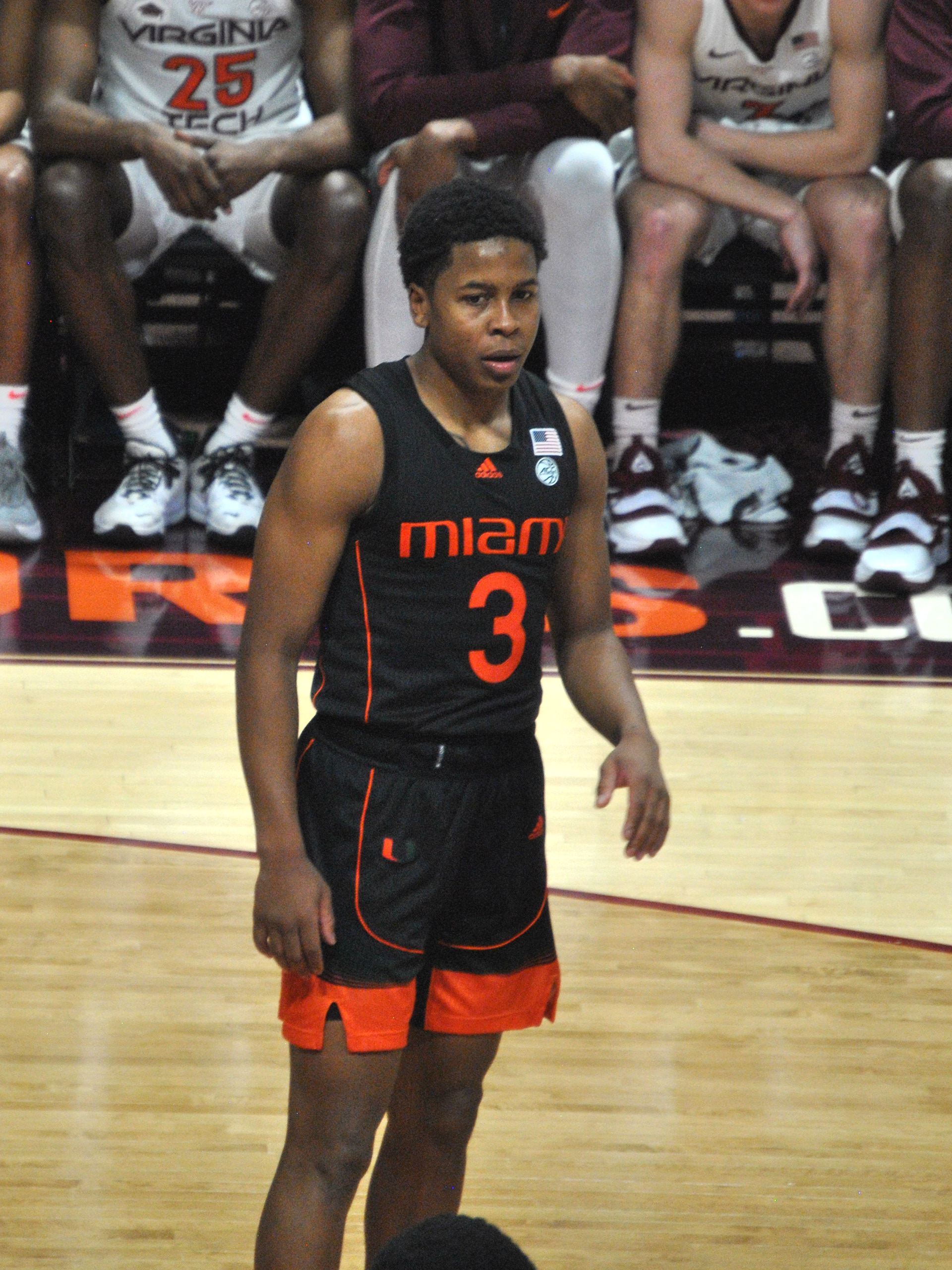
- Moore with Miami in 2022

No. 8 – Longobardi Scafati Basket
- Position: Point guard
- League: LBA

Personal information
- Born: February 3, 1998 (age 28)
- Listed height: 5 ft 11 in (1.80 m)
- Listed weight: 180 lb (82 kg)

Career information
- High school: Morgan Park (Chicago, Illinois)
- College: California (2016–2017); Kansas (2018–2019); DePaul (2019–2021); Miami (Florida) (2021–2022)
- Playing career: 2022–present

Career history
- 2022–2023: Mons-Hainaut
- 2023: FMP SoccerBet
- 2023–2024: Pistoia 2000
- 2024–2025: Río Breogán
- 2025–2026: Al Ahly
- 2026–present: Scafati Basket

Career highlights
- ACC All-Defensive team (2022); Illinois Mr. Basketball (2016)

Charles Edward Moore (born February 3, 1998) is an American basketball player for Scafati Basket of the Lega Basket Serie A (LBA), whose college basketball career spanned four major conferences culminating with a year for the Miami Hurricanes of the Atlantic Coast Conference (ACC) during the 2021–22 ACC basketball season. He previously played a full season for the California Golden Bears and the Kansas Jayhawks as well as two seasons for the DePaul Blue Demons. At Morgan Park High School he won two Illinois High School Association (IHSA) state championships and Illinois Mr. Basketball.

In college, he led the Big East Conference in assists playing for the 2019–20 DePaul Blue Demons. That season, he set the Wintrust Arena single-game assists record (13). Later, he helped the 2021–22 Miami Hurricanes become the first team in school history to reach the Elite Eight at the 2022 NCAA Division I men's basketball tournament. That season he earned All-ACC defensive team and All-ACC honorable mention recognition.

== Early life ==
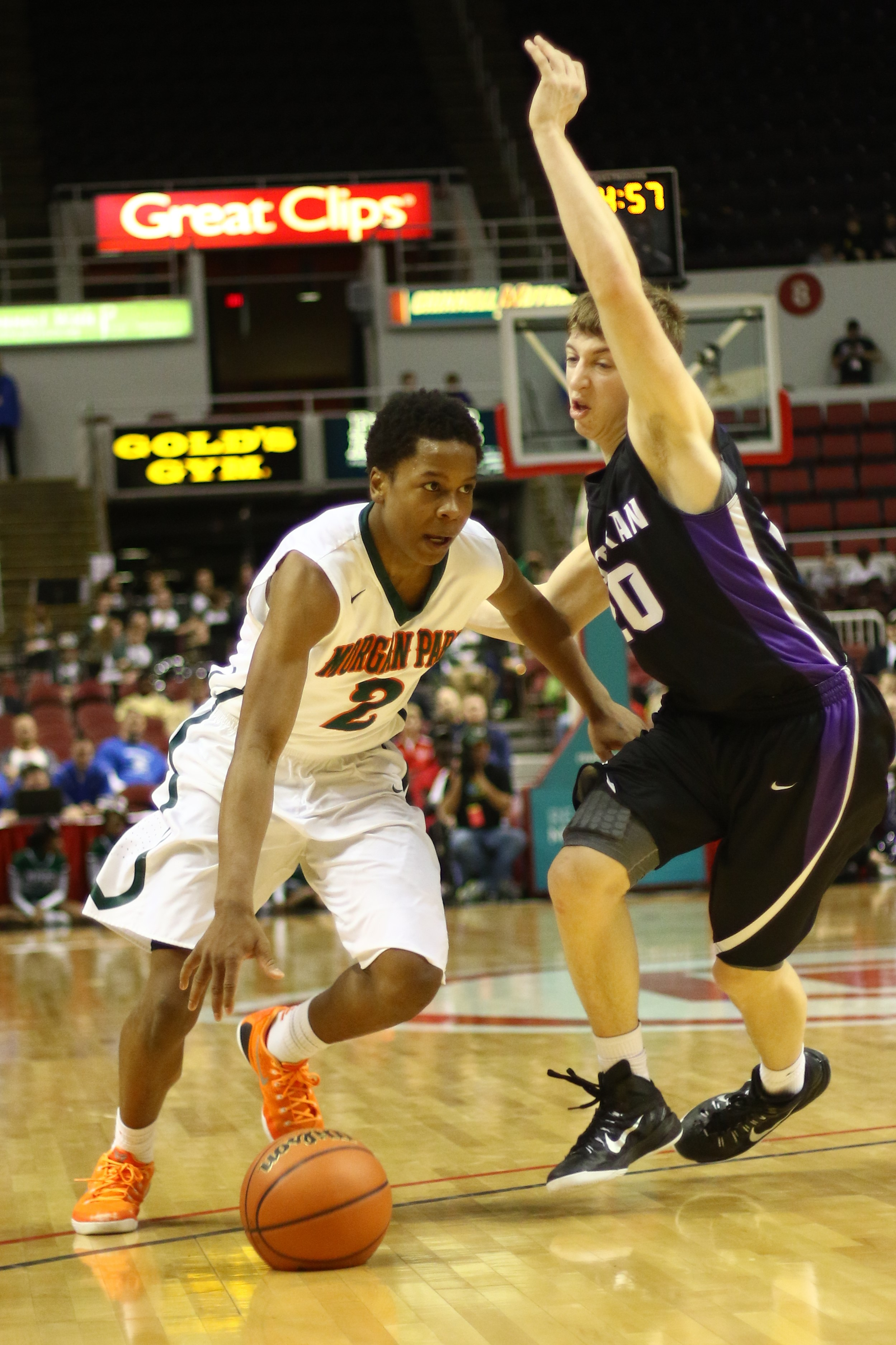
Moore in 2015 in the IHSA Class 3A consolation game

Moore is the son of Curis and Tanya Moore. Moore's father started training him to dribble at age 3 and continued training his ball handling skills as he was growing up. He was raised in Chicago's Englewood Community area. Moore was part of back-to-back IHSA Class 3A state champions in 2013 and 2014 at Morgan Park High School. As a freshman for the 2012–2013, team he served as backup to senior Billy Garrett Jr. In both the 2014 state semifinals against Orr Academy High School and the championship game against Lincoln High School of his sophomore season, he contributed 12 points as one of three double digit scorers for Morgan Park. As a junior, he teamed with Marcus LoVett Jr. for Morgan Park's third place finish in the state tournament. They lost to Jordan Goodwin and Tarkus Ferguson of Althoff Catholic High School in the IHSA Class 3A semi-finals. They defeated Rockford Lutheran High School in the consolation game.

In November 2015, Moore, who was at the time the top recruit in Illinois and the number 57 recruit in the national class of 2016 according to Rivals.com, committed to play for head coach Josh Pastner (and assistant coach Damon Stoudamire) at Memphis, becoming the first Chicago area player to commit to Memphis since Derrick Rose. As a senior, he was joined by sophomore transfer Ayo Dosunmu who played a supporting role. Morgan Park was defeated in the supersectional round of the IHSA tournament by Lincoln-Way West High School, but not before Moore established school career records with points (2,346), assists (368) and steals (303). Moore won Illinois Mr. Basketball in 2016 over Mike Smith and Zach Norvell Jr. after averaging 28 points, seven assists, five steals and four rebounds. Less than 2 weeks later, Pastner was hired by Georgia Tech. Moore immediately decommitted from Memphis. He considered offers from California, Georgia Tech, Illinois, LSU, Miami, SMU, UNLV and Western Kentucky. Six weeks later, he signed to play at Cal for Cuonzo Martin after center Ivan Rabb decided not to declare for the 2016 NBA draft. According to an article in The Daily Californian, at that point in his career, Moore was regarded as a scorer and playmaker who would have to learn how to excel on defense to succeed at a higher level. Nonetheless, he was the highlight of his recruiting class for the 2016–17 Cal Bears and would help replace production lost in the backcourt with the departures of Jaylen Brown and Tyrone Wallace.

== College career ==
In his second game at Cal, with three starters sidelined due to injuries, Moore broke Shareef Abdur-Rahim's 1995 single-game freshman scoring school record of 33 points by scoring 38 in an overtime win against UC Irvine. As a freshman, Moore was the only player to start all 34 games for Cal and led the team in assists and steals, while scoring 12.2 points per game. Following the season, Martin was hired by Missouri. Subsequently, with Rabb entering the 2017 NBA draft and Jabari Bird graduating, Moore transferred to Kansas.

According to NCAA transfer rules, Moore sat out a season before joining the 2018–19 Kansas Jayhawks, which had guards Devon Dotson, Marcus Garrett, Ochai Agbaji, LaGerald Vick and Quentin Grimes. Moore's only start of the season was December 8 against New Mexico State. On December 18, 2018, with Udoka Azubuike sidelined and Dedric Lawson somewhat limited by foul trouble, Moore scored a season-high 18 points (all on three point shots) against South Dakota. Following the season, he announced he would be transferring to be closer to family. By this time, his father had health issues, and Moore transferred to hometown DePaul University.

A month before the season was to begin, Moore received a waiver to play immediately for the 2019–20 DePaul Blue Demons. On November 26, 2019, Moore tallied 13 assists against the Central Michigan Chippewas, establishing the Wintrust Arena single-game assists record. During the COVID-19 pandemic-shortened 2019–20 NCAA Division I men's basketball season, Moore fell 4 assists shy of joining Rod Strickland (1987–88) as the only Blue Demons with 400 points and 200 assists in a season. Nonetheless, he was only player in the Big East Conference to place in the top ten in scoring (8th), assists (1st) and steals (6th). Moore began the 2020–21 DePaul Blue Demons season as a pre-season All-2020–21 Big East Conference first team selection. Moore picked up Big East player of the week honors on February 21, 2021. Following the season, which was the fifth consecutive year in with DePaul finished last in the Big East, DePaul fired head coach Dave Leitao. That summer when the Big East recognized its 2020–21 scholar athletes, Moore was recognized as an All-Academic team selection.

With the NCAA having granted an additional year of eligibility to all players due to the COVID-19 pandemic, Moore elected to transfer to play for the 2021–22 Miami Hurricanes where Chris Lykes had just vacated the point guard role and he had relationships with head coach Jim Larranaga and assistant coach Bill Courtney. Following the regular season Moore joined teammates Kameron McGusty and Isaiah Wong on the All-ACC basketball team. Moore earned All-Defensive team and honorable mention All-ACC recognition. Moore, fellow 6th-year senior McGusty and Wong are all 6 feet 5 inches (1.96 m) or shorter. In the first round of the 2022 NCAA Division I men's basketball tournament, Moore contributed 16 points, including the go-ahead free throws with 3.0 seconds left, to give Miami a 68–66 victory over USC. Moore contributed 15 points, 9 rebounds and 8 assists in the second round upset of number 2 seed Auburn. Once Miami got to the Sweet Sixteen round, they found themselves playing at Moore's hometown United Center, where they defeated Iowa State to reach the Elite Eight for the first time in school history. Playing again at the United Center, Miami was matched up against the 2021–22 version of the Kansas Jayhawks, one of Moore's previous teams. The Jayhawks included Moore's former teammate Agbaji. Kansas won the game, and they went on to win the 2022 NCAA Division I Men's Basketball Championship Game. For the season, Moore led the Hurricanes in assists (4.5/game) and steals (2.0/game), and he contributed 12.7 points/game. His 2.0 steals/game was second in the ACC to Reece Beekman. Moore was recognized as an All-ACC Academic Team selection.

== Professional career ==
Moore was not invited to the May 18–20, 2022 NBA draft combine. On June 24, 2022, Moore signed an NBA Summer League contract with the Detroit Pistons after going undrafted in the June 23, 2022 NBA draft.

On July 24, 2022, Moore signed his first professional contract with Belfius Mons-Hainaut of the BNXT League.

On February 10, 2023, he signed with FMP SoccerBet of the ABA League.

On July 28, 2023, he signed with Pistoia Basket 2000 of the Lega Basket Serie A (LBA).

On June 4, 2024, he signed with Río Breogán of the Liga ACB.

On July 27, 2026, he signed with Scafati Basket of the Lega Basket Serie A (LBA).

== Career statistics ==
Legend
GP	Games played	GS	Games started	MPG	Minutes per game
FG%	Field goal percentage	3P%	3-point field goal percentage	FT%	Free throw percentage
RPG	Rebounds per game	APG	Assists per game	SPG	Steals per game
BPG	Blocks per game	PPG	Points per game	**Bold**	Career high

=== College ===
Year	Team	GP	GS	MPG	FG%	3P%	FT%	RPG	APG	SPG	BPG	PPG
2016–17	California	34	34	28.8	.388	.352	.756	2.0	3.5	1.1	.0	12.2
2017–18	Kansas	Transferred										
2018–19	Kansas	35	1	13.1	.286	.267	.714	1.0	1.3	.6	**.1**	2.9
2019–20	DePaul	32	32	**35.6**	.376	.317	**.811**	3.3	**6.1**	1.5	**.1**	**15.5**
2020–21	DePaul	16	15	32.3	.407	.346	.762	**3.6**	4.2	1.1	.0	14.4
2021–22	Miami (FL)	**37**	**37**	32.5	**.447**	**.364**	.737	2.6	4.6	**2.0**	**.1**	12.4
Career		154	119	27.9	.394	.334	.771	2.4	3.9	1.3	.1	11.1

== See also ==
- Miami Hurricanes men's basketball statistical leaders
- DePaul Blue Demons men's basketball statistical leaders
