= 2009–10 Miami Hurricanes men's basketball team =

American college basketball season

2009–10 Miami Hurricanes men's basketball

Charleston Classic and Orange Bowl Classic Champions
- Conference: Atlantic Coast Conference
- Record: 20-13 (4-12 ACC)
- Head coach: Frank Haith
- Home arena: BankUnited Center

2009–10 ACC men's basketball standings
	Conf.				Overall
Team	W		L	PCT	W		L	PCT
No. 3 Duke †	13	–	3	.813	35	–	5	.875
No. 20 Maryland	13	–	3	.813	24	–	9	.727
Florida State	10	–	6	.625	22	–	10	.688
Virginia Tech	10	–	6	.625	25	–	9	.735
Wake Forest	9	–	7	.563	20	–	10	.667
Clemson	9	–	7	.563	21	–	11	.656
Georgia Tech	7	–	9	.438	23	–	13	.639
Boston College	6	–	10	.375	15	–	16	.484
Virginia	5	–	11	.313	15	–	16	.484
North Carolina	5	–	11	.313	20	–	17	.541
NC State	5	–	11	.313	20	–	16	.556
Miami (FL)	4	–	12	.250	20	–	13	.606
† 2010 ACC tournament winner As of March 19, 2010; Rankings from AP Poll

The 2009–10 Miami Hurricanes men's basketball team represented the University of Miami during the 2009–10 NCAA Division I men's basketball season. The Hurricanes, led by 7th-year head coach Frank Haith, played their home games at the BankUnited Center and were members of the Atlantic Coast Conference.

They finished the season 20–13, losing in the ACC tournament semifinals to Duke 77–74 in March 2010. The Hurricanes did not qualify for the NCAA tournament. Miami was ranked as high as #23 in the AP poll on January 1, 2010 after a 15-1 start to the regular season.

== Schedule ==
Date time, TV	Rank^{#}	Opponent^{#}	Result	Record	Site city, state
Regular season
		North Carolina Central	W 83-53	1-0	
		Nova Southeastern	W 108-58	2-0	
		Tulane; Charleston Classic	W 74-54	3-0	
		UNC Wilmington; Charleston Classic	W 67-60	4-0	
		South Carolina; Charleston Classic	W 85-70	5-0	
		Florida Gulf Coast	W 77-58	6-0	
		South Carolina Upstate	W 70-41	7-0	
		Minnesota	W 63-58	8-0	
		Boston College	L 60-61	8-1	
		South Carolina State	W 91-54	9-1	
		Stetson	W 69-49	10-1	
		Florida Atlantic; Orange Bowl Basketball Classic	W 87-69	11-1	
		North Carolina A&T	W 80-59	12-1	
		Bethune-Cookman	W 73-55	13-1	
		Pepperdine	W 86-63	14-1	
		Wake Forest	W 67-66	15-1	
		Virginia Tech	L 66-81	15-2	
		Virginia	L 57-75	15-3	
		Boston College	L 75-79	15-4	
		Maryland	L 59-81	15-5	
		Virginia Tech	W 82-75	16-5	
		Wake Forest	L 53-62	16-6	
		Florida State	L 65-71	16-7	
		Georgia Tech	W 64-62	17-7	
		Clemson	L 66-74	17-8	
		Duke	L 74-81	17-9	
		Virginia	W 74-62	18-9	
		NC State	L 66-71	18-10	
		North Carolina	L 62-69	18-11	
		Florida State	L 60-61	18-12	
ACC tournament
		Wake Forest	W 83-62	19-12	
		Virginia Tech	W 70-65	20-12	
		Duke	L 74-77	20-13	
*Non-conference game. ^{#}Rankings from AP Poll. (#) Tournament seedings in parentheses. A=NIT Alabama bracket. All times are in Eastern Time.
