= Frank Haith =

American basketball coach (born 1965)

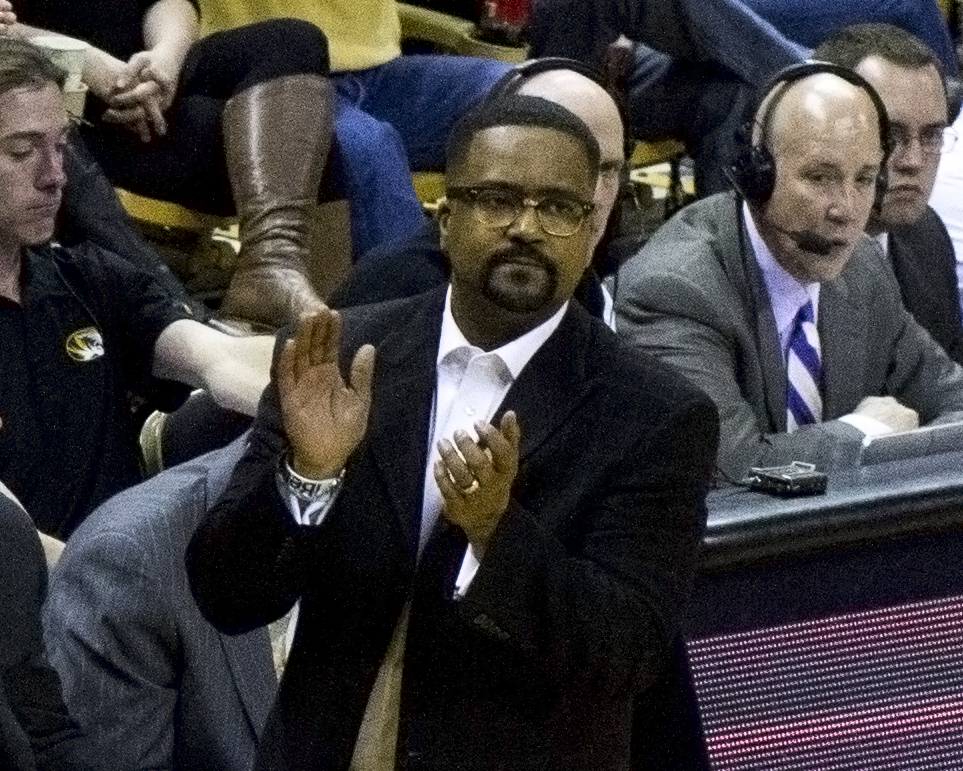
- Haith at Mizzou Arena in 2014

Current position
- Title: Assistant coach
- Team: Texas A&M
- Conference: SEC

Biographical details
- Born: November 3, 1965 (age 60); Queens, New York City, U.S.
- Education: Elon

Coaching career (HC unless noted)
- 1985–1989: Elon (assistant)
- 1989–1990: Wake Forest (assistant)
- 1990–1992: UNC Wilmington (assistant)
- 1992–1995: Texas A&M (assistant)
- 1995–1996: Penn State (assistant)
- 1996–1997: Texas A&M (assistant)
- 1997–2001: Wake Forest (assistant)
- 2001–2004: Texas (assistant)
- 2004–2011: Miami (FL)
- 2011–2014: Missouri
- 2014–2022: Tulsa
- 2022–2023: Memphis (assistant)
- 2023–2025: Texas (assistant)
- 2025–present: Texas A&M (assistant)

Head coaching record
- Overall: 343–237 (.591)
- Tournaments: 1–4 (NCAA Division I); 7–6 (NIT)

Accomplishments and honors

Championships
- Big 12 tournament (2012); AAC regular season (2020)

Awards
- Henry Iba Award (2012); AP Coach of the Year (2012); AAC Coach of the Year (2020)

Frank James Haith Jr. (born November 3, 1965) is an American men's basketball coach, currently serving as an assistant coach at Texas A&M University. He previously served as head coach of the Tulsa Golden Hurricane from 2014 to 2022, and prior to that he served as the head coach at the University of Miami and the University of Missouri, leaving both programs in the midst of NCAA investigations.

== Early life ==
Frank Haith was born in Queens, New York City to Frank Haith, Sr. and Dolores Haith. At the age of five, Haith was sent with his older sister to Burlington, North Carolina, where they were raised by their grandmother, Ethel Mae Haith. They were joined by their three remaining siblings six years later when their mother died of a heart attack.

== Career ==
=== Early career ===
Prior to his job at the University of Miami, Haith had been an assistant coach for 15 years at such programs as Texas, Texas A&M, UNCW, Penn State, Wake Forest, and Elon University. As an assistant coach he recruited six McDonald's All-Americans, Rodney Rogers in 1990 to Wake Forest, Jerald Brown in 1995 to Texas A&M, Bradley Buckman in 2002 to Texas, and LaMarcus Aldridge, Daniel Gibson, and Michael Williams in 2004 to Texas.

=== Miami ===
Haith was hired on April 11, 2004 and tasked with leading the Hurricanes into the Atlantic Coast Conference. In his first season, Haith took a team that was coming off two straight losing seasons and picked to finish last in the ACC and guided it to the postseason for the first time since 2002. As a result, Haith was a finalist for the Naismith National Coach of the Year Award.

Haith again took Miami to the NIT in 2005, and the Hurricanes won their first two games before bowing out in a loss to the Michigan Wolverines. It was just the second time in Miami's basketball history that the Hurricanes had won back-to-back postseason games.

Haith reached just one NCAA tournament as the head coach at Miami, leading the Hurricanes to a second-round appearance in 2008. The next season, Haith's team returned four starters, including sharpshooter Jack McClinton. Miami began the season ranked 16th in the USA Today/ESPN pre-season poll, and the media picked it to finish fourth in the ACC. However, Miami finished below .500 in conference play and missed the NCAA tournament, instead participating in the NIT. The following season, Haith's team finished in last place in the ACC.

Haith has also led the Hurricanes to success off-the-court. Under Haith's tenure, all 8 Miami senior basketball players who completed their eligibility earned their degrees. Miami also placed three players on the ACC All-Academic basketball team for the 2004–2005 season, more than any school in the conference.

==== Infractions ====
An investigation in the Nevin Shapiro scandal at Miami's football program also uncovered impropriety in the men's basketball program. After 2 1/2 years of investigation, on October 22, 2013, the NCAA handed Haith, who had by that point left for Missouri, a five-game suspension to open the 2013–14 season.

=== Missouri ===
On April 4, 2011, Haith accepted the head coaching job at the University of Missouri.

==== First year (2011–12 season) ====
In his first year at Missouri, Haith inherited a team that a year before went 23–11 and lost in the opening round of the NCAA tournament. From that team, only nine players returned for Haith's first year, leaving him with a short bench, though the team had six seniors and had been to the NCAA tournament each of the last three seasons.

The bench got even shorter when senior Laurence Bowers, the team's second-best returning scorer and leading rebounder, went down with a torn ACL before the season began and after the first semester when sophomore Kadeem Green transferred. The loss of both Bowers and Green left Haith with only two post players and just seven total scholarship players for his first season at Mizzou.

To make up for this deficiency, Haith and his staff put into place a four-guard system to attempt to take advantage of the speed, passing, and outside shooting of his roster. The system resulted in the Tigers setting a school record for the most regular season wins with 27. The Tigers went 13–0 in the non-conference and 14–4 in Big 12 play, and went 3–0 in the Sprint Center in Kansas City to win the Big 12 tournament.

At 30–4, the Tigers were given a 2-seed in the West bracket of the NCAA tournament, where they were upset by 15-seed Norfolk State 86–84 in their first game, ending their season at 30–5.

On March 19, 2012, the United States Basketball Writers Association awarded Haith the Henry Iba Award as national coach of the year. On March 30, 2012, Haith was named the Associated Press College Basketball Coach of the Year.

==== Second year (2012–13 season) ====
Haith's second year at Missouri began with plenty of promise, as the Tigers began the season ranked #14 and blended a quality group of transfers in Alex Oriakhi (UConn), Jabari Brown (Oregon), Keion Bell (Pepperdine) and Earnest Ross (Auburn) in with returning point guard Phil Pressey and Laurence Bowers, who was returning from a knee injury.

The Tigers started 5–0 before losing to #2 Louisville in the Battle 4 Atlantis tournament in the Bahamas in late November. Mizzou would reel off six straight wins after that, including defeating NCAA Tournament teams VCU and #10 Illinois in St. Louis. Ranked #7 in the country, Mizzou lost to UCLA before beating Bucknell heading into its inaugural season in the SEC.

In conference play, Mizzou went 11–7, with all of those losses coming on the road. The Tigers defeated #5 Florida in Mizzou Arena and won three of their final four games heading into the SEC tournament.

Mizzou beat former Big 12 rival Texas A&M in the second round of the tournament before losing to Ole Miss in the quarterfinals, 64–62.

With a 23–10 record, the Tigers secured a 9-seed in the Midwest bracket of the NCAA tournament, where they had to play 8-seed Colorado State. The Rams defeated Mizzou in the second round matchup at Rupp Arena, 84–72.

==== Third year (2013–14 season) ====
With Haith sitting out the first five games of the season due to the NCAA suspension, assistant Tim Fuller started the season as interim coach. However, Missouri credits the entire season to Haith.

Haith's third team was hit hard by roster turnover, losing Pressey early to the NBA, Laurence Bowers, Keion Bell and Alex Oriakhi to graduation, and Negus Webster-Chan, Stefan Jankovic and Dominique Bull to transfers.

Haith's Tigers finished 9–9 in league play to finish sixth, but once again logged impressive wins over UCLA, West Virginia, Nevada, NC State in non-league play and a sweep of Arkansas.

Mizzou beat Texas A&M in the second round of the SEC tournament, but lost to eventual champion and #1 ranked Florida in the quarterfinals, 72–49.

With a 22–11 record, the Tigers secured an invitation to the NIT, where they beat Davidson in round one before losing to Southern Miss in the second round.

In 2016, the University of Missouri announced findings of an internal investigation that uncovered violations occurring throughout Haith's tenure at the school. As part of its self-imposed sanctions, Missouri vacated all wins from the 2013–14 season, bringing Haith's official record while coaching the Tigers to 53–28 (25–20 in conference play).

=== Tulsa ===
On April 17, 2014, Haith reportedly agreed to leave Missouri to become head coach at the University of Tulsa. Haith reportedly text messaged the athletic director of Missouri and told him he was going to be taking the Tulsa job after they failed to connect the previous evening. A USA Today article reports Haith called Mike Alden the night before accepting the job and replied to a text response from Alden after Alden did not take his call. Haith was introduced as Tulsa's new coach on April 18 after signing a six-year contract worth about $1.3 million per year. In his first year at Tulsa, Haith led the Golden Hurricane to a 23–11 record with key wins over Connecticut, Temple, and Memphis.

In his second season Haith and the Golden Hurricane returned to the NCAA Tournament falling to Michigan in the First Four in Dayton. Tulsa defeated #9 Wichita State in non-league play and went 12–6 in AAC play. Tulsa notched one of its most impressive wins of the year with an 82–77 win at #16 SMU, snapping the Mustangs 15-game home winning streak.

In Haith's tenure at Tulsa the Golden Hurricane rank third in the AAC in wins and Haith is the second-winningest coach in AAC history.

Tulsa has recorded numerous wins over ranked opponents, including a win over #5 Houston in 2020-21, #20 Memphis and #23 Wichita State in 2019–20 and #16 Kansas State in 2018–19.

In 2020, Tulsa claimed its first AAC Championship, with a 13–5 record in AAC play. Tulsa has finished above its predicted AAC preseason projection every year under Haith and with his team's stellar performance Haith was named AAC Coach of the Year. He was also named NABC District 24 Coach of the Year.

On-court success is not the only area where Haith has led the TU to a resurgence. The program has established school records for single year and multi-year APR records. The Hurricane has broken program records for semester and cumulative GPA. His program has graduated 20-of-22 seniors with two players –– Shaquille Harrison in 2016 and Martins Igbanu in 2020 –– earning American Athletic Conference Scholar-Athletes of the Year honors.

Tulsa boasts two active NBA players –– DaQuan Jeffries with the Sacramento Kings and Harrison with the Chicago Bulls –– while Haith has also had numerous players sign professional contracts abroad including both 2020 seniors Lawson Korita and Igbanu.

Haith resigned on March 12, 2022.

== Personal life ==
Haith is a 1988 graduate of Elon University (then Elon College). He and his wife, Pam, have two children; one son, Corey, and one daughter, Brianna. Corey was a member of Haith's coaching staff at the University of Tulsa, while his daughter is a nationally renowned dancer.

== Head coaching record ==
Record table
Season	Team	Overall	Conference	Standing	Postseason
Miami Hurricanes (Atlantic Coast Conference) (2004–2010)
2004–05	Miami	16–13	7–9	T–6th	NIT First Round
2005–06	Miami	18–16	7–9	T–7th	NIT Quarterfinal
2006–07	Miami	12–20	4–12	12th	
2007–08	Miami	23–11	8–8	T–5th	NCAA Division I Round of 32
2008–09	Miami	19–13	7–9	T–7th	NIT Second Round
2009–10	Miami	20–13	4–12	12th	
2010–11	Miami	21–15	6–10	9th	NIT Quarterfinal
Miami:		129–101 (.561)	43–69 (.384)		
Missouri Tigers (Big 12 Conference) (2011–2012)
2011–12	Missouri	30–5	14–4	2nd	NCAA Division I Round of 64
Missouri Tigers (Southeastern Conference) (2012–2014)
2012–13	Missouri	23–11	11–7	T–5th	NCAA Division I Round of 64
2013–14	Missouri	23–12*	9–9*	T–6th	NIT Second Round
Missouri:		76–28 (.731)	34–20 (.630)		
Tulsa Golden Hurricane (American Athletic Conference) (2014–2022)
2014–15	Tulsa	23–11	14–4	2nd	NIT Second Round
2015–16	Tulsa	20–12	12–6	T–3rd	NCAA Division I First Four
2016–17	Tulsa	15–17	8–10	7th	
2017–18	Tulsa	19–12	12–6	4th	
2018–19	Tulsa	18–14	8–10	T–7th	
2019–20	Tulsa	21–10	13–5	T–1st	Postseason Cancelled
2020–21	Tulsa	11–12	7–9	7th	
2021–22	Tulsa	11–20	4–14	10th	
Tulsa:		138–108 (.561)	78–64 (.549)		
Total:		343–237 (.591)			
National champion Postseason invitational champion Conference regular season champion Conference regular season and conference tournament champion Division regular season champion Division regular season and conference tournament champion Conference tournament champion

*Includes 23 vacated wins, 9 of which were conference wins. Under official NCAA records, Haith's career record is 320–237. At Missouri, Haith's official record is 53–28 (25–20 in conference play)
