= Constantin Popa =

Romanian-Israeli basketball player and coach

Constantin Popa קונסטנטין פופה
Personal information
- Born: February 18, 1971 (age 55) Bucharest, Romania
- Died
- Listed height: 7 ft 3 in (2.21 m)
- Listed weight: 235 lb (107 kg)

Career information
- High school: Fork Union Military Academy (Fork Union, Virginia)
- College: Miami (Florida) (1991–1995)
- NBA draft: 1995: 2nd round, 53rd overall pick
- Drafted by: Los Angeles Clippers
- Playing career: 1995–2001
- Position: Center
- Number
- Coaching career: 2005–

Career history

Playing
- 1995–1996: Florida Beach Dogs
- 1996: Pau-Orthez
- 1996–2000: Maccabi Tel Aviv
- 2000–2001: Hapoel Jerusalem

Coaching
- 2005–2007: Cypress Bay HS
- 2007–2011: Indianapolis Greyhounds (asst.)
- 2011–2016: Indianapolis Greyhounds

Career highlights
- As player: 4× Israeli League champion (1997–2000); 3× Israeli State Cup winner (1998–2000); French League champion (1996); 2× Third-team All-Big East (1993, 1995)
- Stats at Basketball Reference

Constantin Popa (Hebrew: קונסטנטין פופה; born February 18, 1971) is a Romanian-Israeli professional basketball coach and former player.

== Biography ==
Popa played for Dinamo Bucharest in his native Romania before going overseas to play college basketball in the United States for the University of Miami. The tallest person ever to play for the Hurricanes, he was twice a third team All-Big East selection.

In large part on the strength of a highly effective hook shot, he was selected by the L.A. Clippers with the 53rd pick in the 1995 NBA draft. In the same year he was selected by the Miami Tropics of the USBL as a first round territorial selection (4th pick overall). He never ended up playing a game in either league, although he did play for the Florida Beachdogs of the American CBA, where he developed somewhat of a cult fan following.

He also played in France with Pau-Orthez and with Maccabi Tel Aviv and Hapoel Jerusalem of Israel.

Although not Jewish, he obtained Israeli citizenship as his wife is Jewish.

Popa retired from professional basketball in 2001. He served 4 seasons as assistant coach of the University of Indianapolis Greyhound Women's basketball team, before becoming head coach in April 2011. Popa served five seasons as coach of the Greyhounds, compiling a record of 83–66. He was relieved of his duties in March 2016.

In 2019, he was inducted into the University of Miami Sports Hall of Fame.

== Awards and achievements ==
- Romanian Junior National Team – 87–90
- Romanian National Team – 87–92
- European Championships – 87
- FIBA U18 European Championship 4th – 90
- Big East Conf. 3rd Team – 93, 95
- French ProA Champion – 96
- Israeli League Champion – 97, 98, 99, 00
- Israeli Cup Winner – 98, 99, 00
- Euroleague Finalist – 2000
- Israeli State Cup Finalist – 01
- Israeli League Finalist – 01
