= Miami Hurricanes men's basketball =

College men's basketball team representing University of Miami

2026–27 Miami Hurricanes men's basketball team
- University: University of Miami
- First season: 1926–27; 100 years ago (Note: The men's basketball program was dropped by the university after the 1970–71 season, then restarted beginning with the 1985–86 season (41 years ago).)
- Head coach: Jai Lucas; 2nd season, 26–9 (.743)
- Location: Coral Gables, Florida
- Arena: Watsco Center (capacity: 7,972)
- NCAA division: Division I
- Conference: ACC
- Nickname: Hurricanes
- Colors: Orange, green, and white
- Student section: The Eye
- All-time record: 1,057–800 (.569)
- NCAA tournament record: 16–13 (.552)

NCAA Division I tournament Final Four
- 2023
Other NCAA Division I tournament results
Elite Eight	2022, 2023
Sweet Sixteen	2000, 2013, 2016, 2022, 2023
Appearances	1960, 1998, 1999, 2000, 2002, 2008, 2013, 2016, 2017, 2018, 2022, 2023, 2026

Conference tournament champions
- ACC: 2013

Conference regular-season champions
- Big East: 2000 ACC: 2013, 2023

Uniforms
Home	Away
Alternate	Alternate

The Miami Hurricanes men's basketball team is the college basketball team of the University of Miami in Coral Gables, Florida. The team competes in the Atlantic Coast Conference (ACC).

The University of Miami men's basketball team was formed in 1926, but the program was later dropped by the university in 1971. In 1985, 14 years later, the Hurricanes resumed play as an independent and joined the Big East Conference in 1991, winning the Big East regular season title in 2000. In 2004, in conjunction with the rest of the Miami athletic program, the team moved to the ACC.

In 2012–2013, the team won its first regular season ACC championship and its first ACC championship. In the 2014–2015 season, they reached the final of the National Invitation Tournament (NIT). The team has reached the NCAA Championship's Sweet 16 five times (1999–2000, 2012–2013, 2015–2016, 2021–2022, and 2022–2023), the Elite Eight twice (2021–2022 and 2022–2023), and the Final Four once (2022–2023).

The Hurricanes are currently coached by Jai Lucas, who was named head coach following Jim Larrañaga's resignation. They play their home games at the Watsco Center.

== History ==
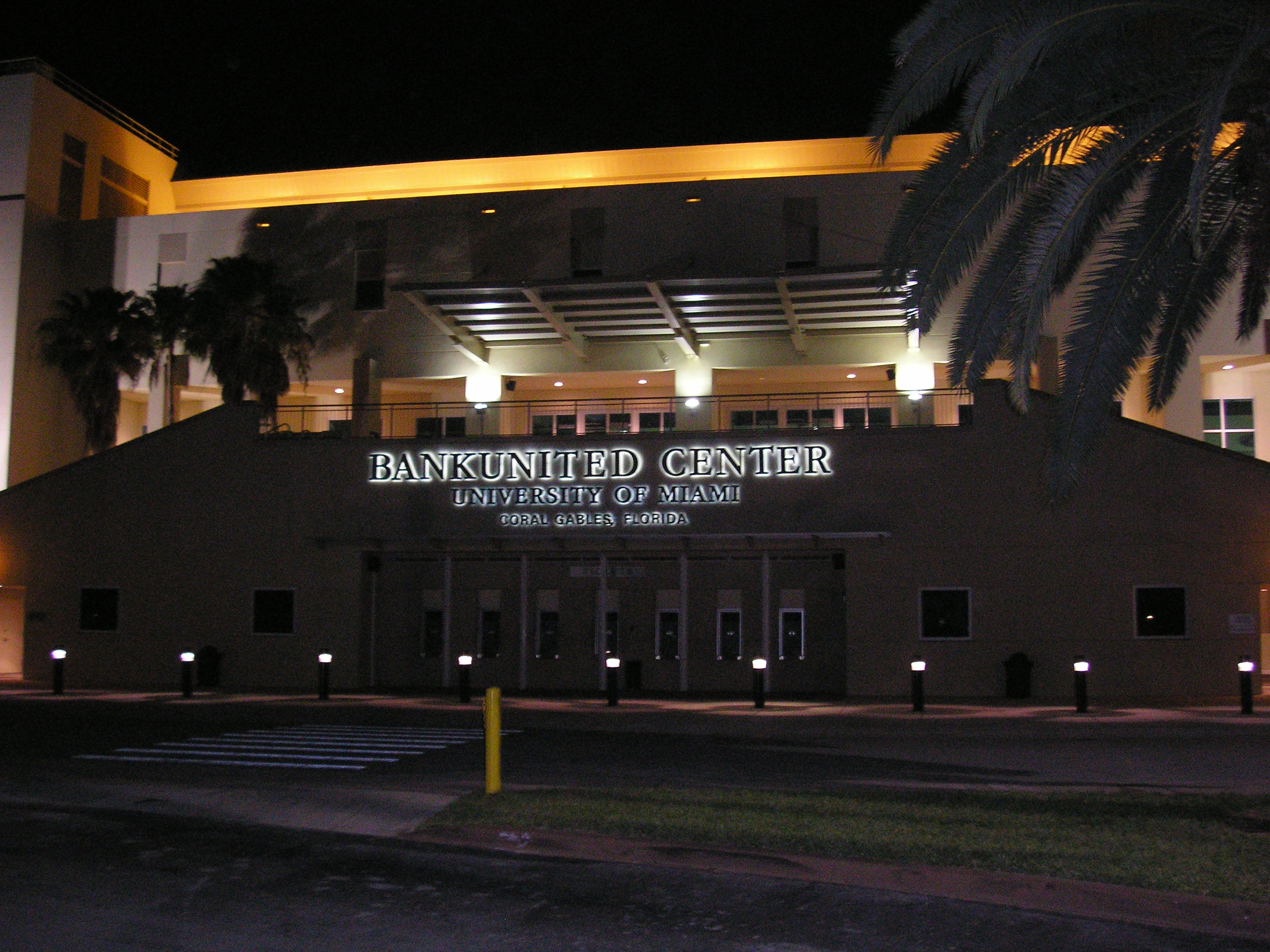
Watsco Center, the home arena of the Hurricanes' men's and women's basketball teams, on the University of Miami campus

=== Perry Clark era (2000–2004) ===
Perry Clark took over the program at Miami in 2000 and spent four seasons with the Hurricanes, where he led them to a 65–54 (.546) record. In his first three seasons with the program, he accumulated 51 wins, the most ever by a Hurricane coach, and became the only Miami coach to take the Hurricanes to the postseason in each of his first two seasons.

Clark's 2001–02 Hurricane squad finished 24–8 and received the school's fourth NCAA Tournament berth and set a school record for wins in a season. Included in the 24 wins were a school-record 14 consecutive victories to open the season. His Hurricanes were not ranked in the preseason, but were ranked for the final 13 weeks of the campaign, ending the year as No. 21, according to the Associated Press.

=== Frank Haith era (2004–2011) ===
Frank Haith was hired on April 11, 2004 and tasked with leading the Hurricanes into the Atlantic Coast Conference. In his first season, Haith took a team that was coming off two straight losing seasons and picked to finish last in the ACC and guided it to the postseason for the first time since 2002. As a result, Haith was a finalist for the Naismith National Coach of the Year Award.

Haith again took Miami to the NIT in 2005, and the Hurricanes won their first two games before bowing out in a loss to the Michigan Wolverines. It was just the second time in Miami's basketball history that the Hurricanes had won back-to-back postseason games.

Haith reached just one NCAA tournament as the head coach at Miami, leading the Hurricanes to a second-round appearance in 2008. The next season, Haith's team returned four starters, including sharpshooter Jack McClinton. Miami began the season ranked 16th in the USA Today/ESPN pre-season poll, and the media picked it to finish fourth in the ACC. However, Miami finished below .500 in conference play and missed the NCAA tournament, instead participating in the NIT. The following season, Haith's team finished in last place in the ACC.

Haith has also led the Hurricanes to success off-the-court. Under Haith's tenure, all eight Miami senior basketball players who have completed their eligibility have earned their degrees. Miami also placed three players on the ACC All-Academic basketball team for the 2004–2005 season, more than any school in the conference.

=== Jim Larrañaga era (2011–2024) ===
On April 22, 2011, Jim Larrañaga accepted the head coaching position at the University of Miami. In his first season at Miami, he led the team to a 9–7 record in-conference. It marked the school's first ever winning record in the ACC.

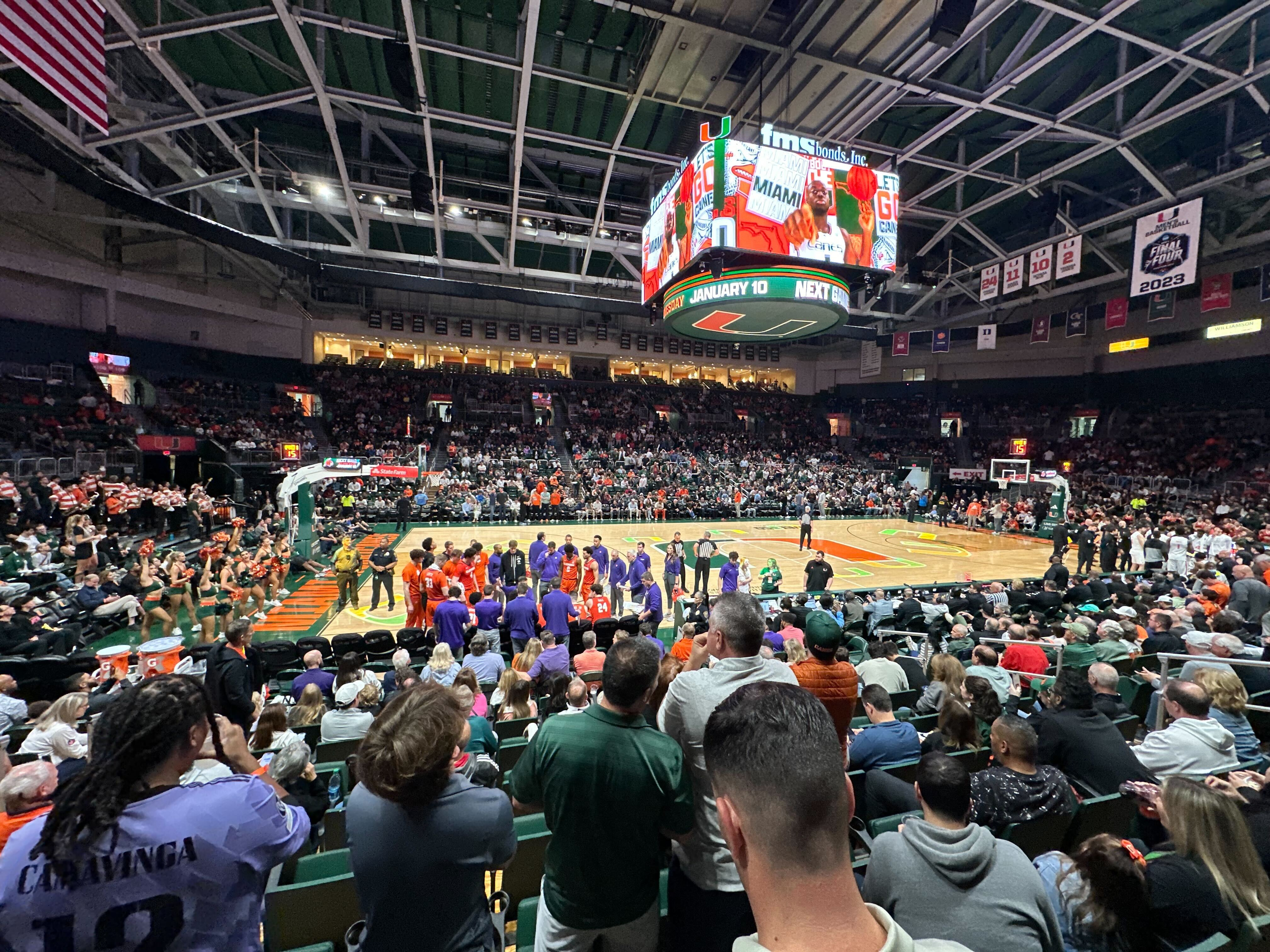
Miami hosts Clemson at the Watsco Center for an ACC conference game in 2024

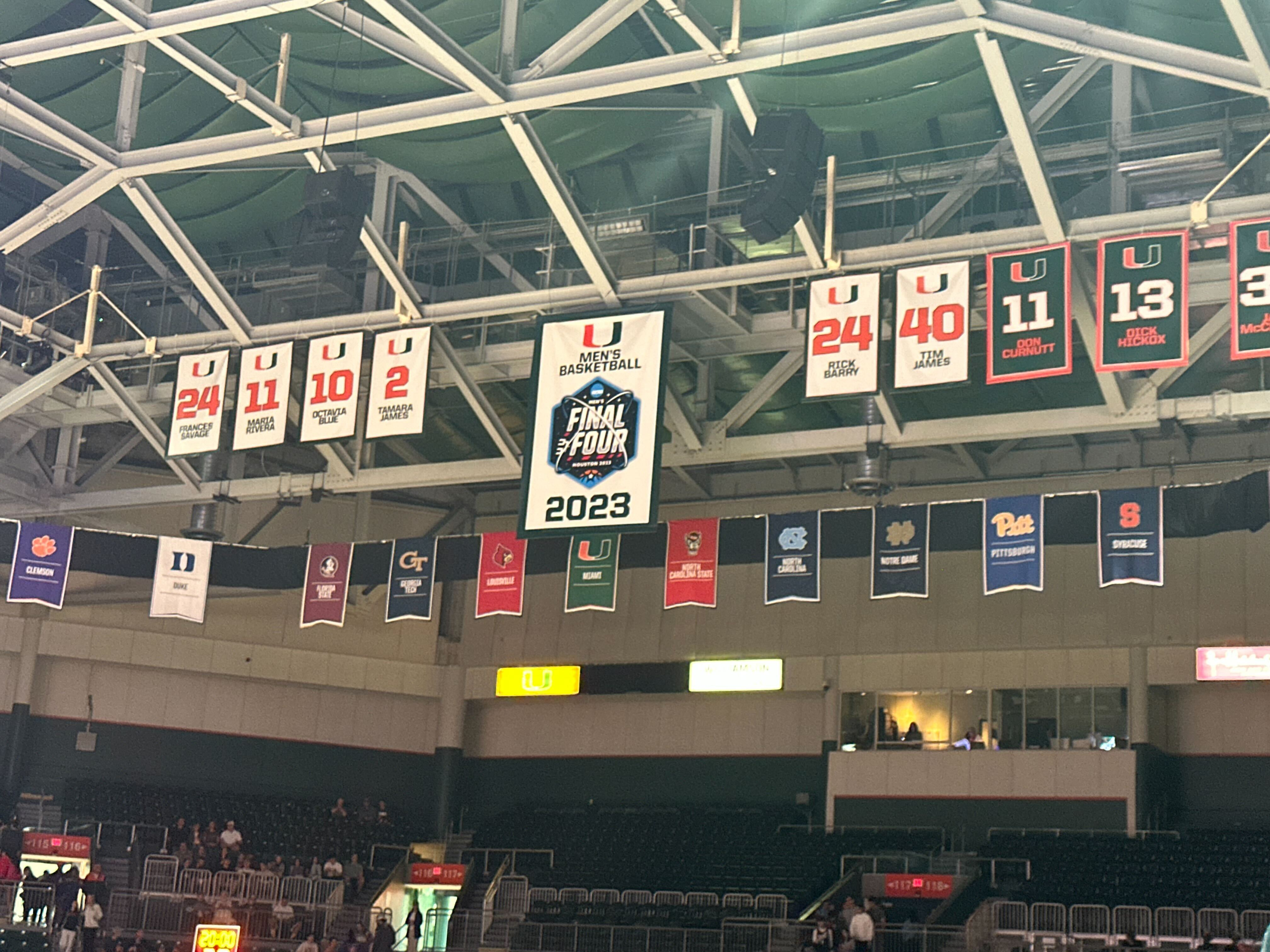
Miami's 2023 NCAA Tournament Final Four banner at the Watsco Center

In his second season, Larrañaga led the Hurricanes to arguably their best season since the Rick Barry era. They won the ACC regular-season title (the first time in 11 years, and only the fourth time in 32 years, that a team from North Carolina had not won at least a share of the title). The highlight of the season was an unprecedented 90–63 rout of #1 ranked Duke. That win was Miami's first-ever defeat of a top-ranked team, and the largest margin of defeat for a #1 team ever.

On March 17, 2013, Larrañaga coached the Hurricanes to the ACC tournament title—the first tournament title in the program's history — with an 87–77 win over North Carolina. On April 4, 2013, Larrañaga was voted the Associated Press' college basketball coach of the year. A week later, the Hurricanes advanced to the Sweet 16 of the NCAA tournament with their school-record 29th win. The season ended the following weekend with a loss to Marquette. He claimed the Hurricanes had not enough energy to win the game because of Reggie Johnson's injury and Shane Larkin's sickness.

Since the mid-2010s, Miami men's basketball under Larrañaga has become a routine contender in the ACC and nationally. In 2022, Miami made their first Elite Eight in program history, only falling short against eventual national champions Kansas. In the 2023 tournament, the Hurricanes made an even bigger leap, overcoming top regional seed Houston and second-seeded Texas en route to the program's first-ever Final Four. However, in the Final Four, they again ran into the eventual champions, this time falling to UConn. In 2024, with expectations still high, Miami started strong, starting out 15–7, but they finished the season with 10 straight losses, resulting in a 15–17 record, ultimately missing out on the postseason.

Following a 4–8 start to the 2024–25 season, Larrañaga announced he was stepping down from his head coaching position on December 26, 2024, with associate head coach Bill Courtney being named interim head coach for the remainder of the season.

== Postseason ==
=== NCAA tournament results ===
The Hurricanes have appeared in the NCAA Division I men's basketball tournament thirteen times. Their combined record is 16–13.

Year	Seed	Round	Opponent	Result
1960		First Round	WKU	L 84–107
1998	#11	First Round	#6 UCLA	L 62–65
1999	#2	First Round; Second Round	#15 Lafayette #10 Purdue	W 75–54; L 63–73
2000	#6	First Round; Second Round; Sweet Sixteen	#11 Arkansas #3 Ohio State #7 Tulsa	W 75–71; W 75–62; L 71–80
2002	#5	First Round	#12 Missouri	L 80–93
2008	#7	First Round; Second Round	#10 Saint Mary's #2 Texas	W 78–64; L 72–75
2013	#2	First Round; Second Round; Sweet Sixteen	#15 Pacific #7 Illinois #3 Marquette	W 78–49; W 63–59; L 61–71
2016	#3	First Round; Second Round; Sweet Sixteen	#14 Buffalo #11 Wichita State #2 Villanova	W 79–72; W 65–57; L 69–92
2017	#8	First Round	#9 Michigan State	L 58–78
2018	#6	First Round	#11 Loyola (IL)	L 62–64
2022	#10	First Round; Second Round; Sweet Sixteen; Elite Eight	#7 USC #2 Auburn #11 Iowa State #1 Kansas	W 68–66; W 79–61; W 70–56; L 50–76
2023	#5	First Round; Second Round; Sweet Sixteen; Elite Eight; Final Four	#12 Drake #4 Indiana #1 Houston #2 Texas #4 UConn	W 63–56; W 85–69; W 89–75; W 88–81; L 59–72
2026	#7	First Round; Second Round	#10 Missouri #2 Purdue	W 80–66; L 69–79

=== NIT results ===
The Hurricanes have appeared in the National Invitation Tournament (NIT) 12 times. Their combined record is 11–12.

Year	Round	Opponent	Result
1961	First Round	Saint Louis	L 56–58
1963	First Round; Quarterfinals	St. Francis; Providence	W 71–70; L 96–106
1964	First Round	Saint Joseph's	L 76–86
1995	First Round	Penn State	L 56–62
1997	First Round	Michigan	L 63–76
2001	First Round	Auburn	L 60–58
2005	First Round	South Carolina	L 67–69
2006	First Round; Second Round; Quarterfinals	Oklahoma State; Creighton; Michigan	W 62–59; W 53–52; L 65–71
2009	First Round; Second Round	Providence; Florida	W 78–66; L 60–74
2011	First Round; Second Round; Quarterfinals	Florida Atlantic; Missouri State; Alabama	W 85–62; W 81–72; L 64–79
2012	First Round; Second Round	Valparaiso; Minnesota	W 66–50; L 60–78
2015	First Round; Second Round; Quarterfinals; Semifinals; Final	North Carolina Central; Alabama; Richmond; Temple; Stanford	W 75–71; W 73–66; W 63–61; W 60–57; L 64–66

=== NAIA results ===
The Hurricanes have made one NAIA tournament appearance with a record of 0-1.

Year	Round	Opponent	Result
1949	First Round	Eastern Illinois State	L 73-89

== Notable players ==
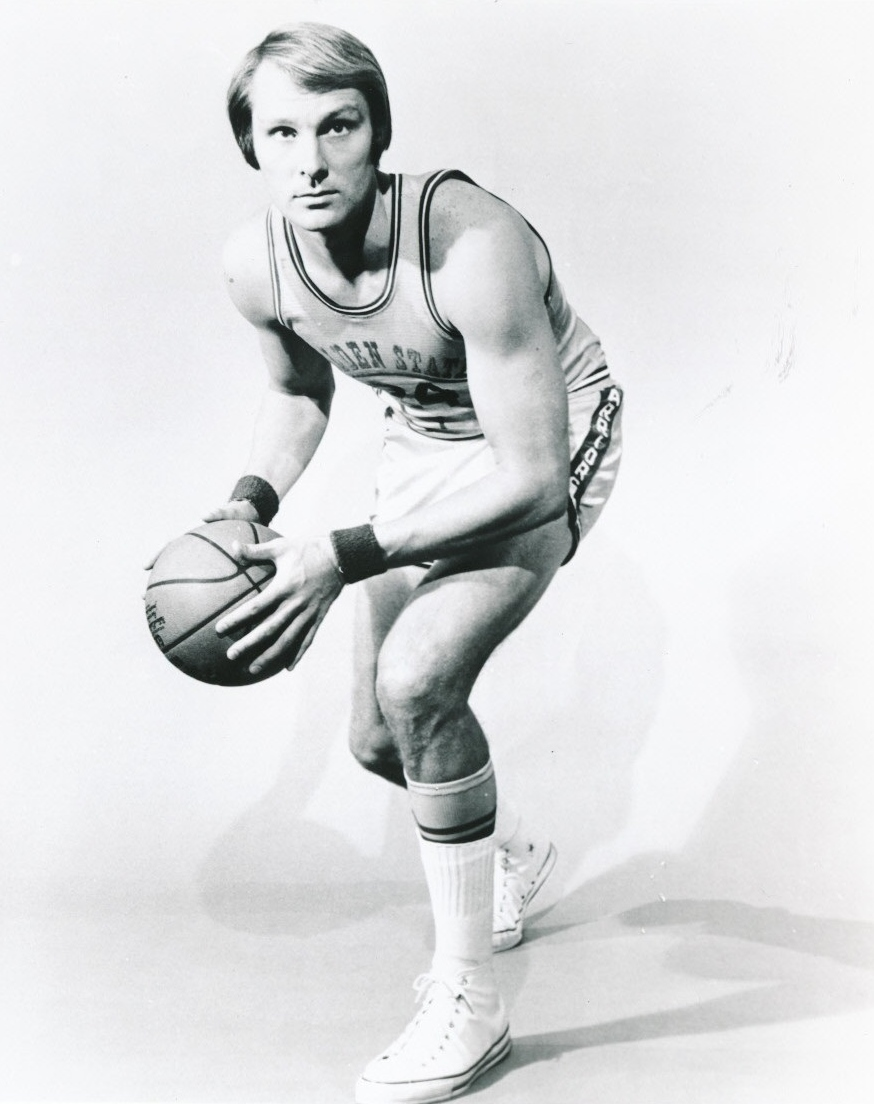
Rick Barry: #24 Miami jersey retired in 1976. Inducted into the Naismith Memorial Basketball Hall of Fame in 1987 and the Collegiate Basketball Hall of Fame in 2006.

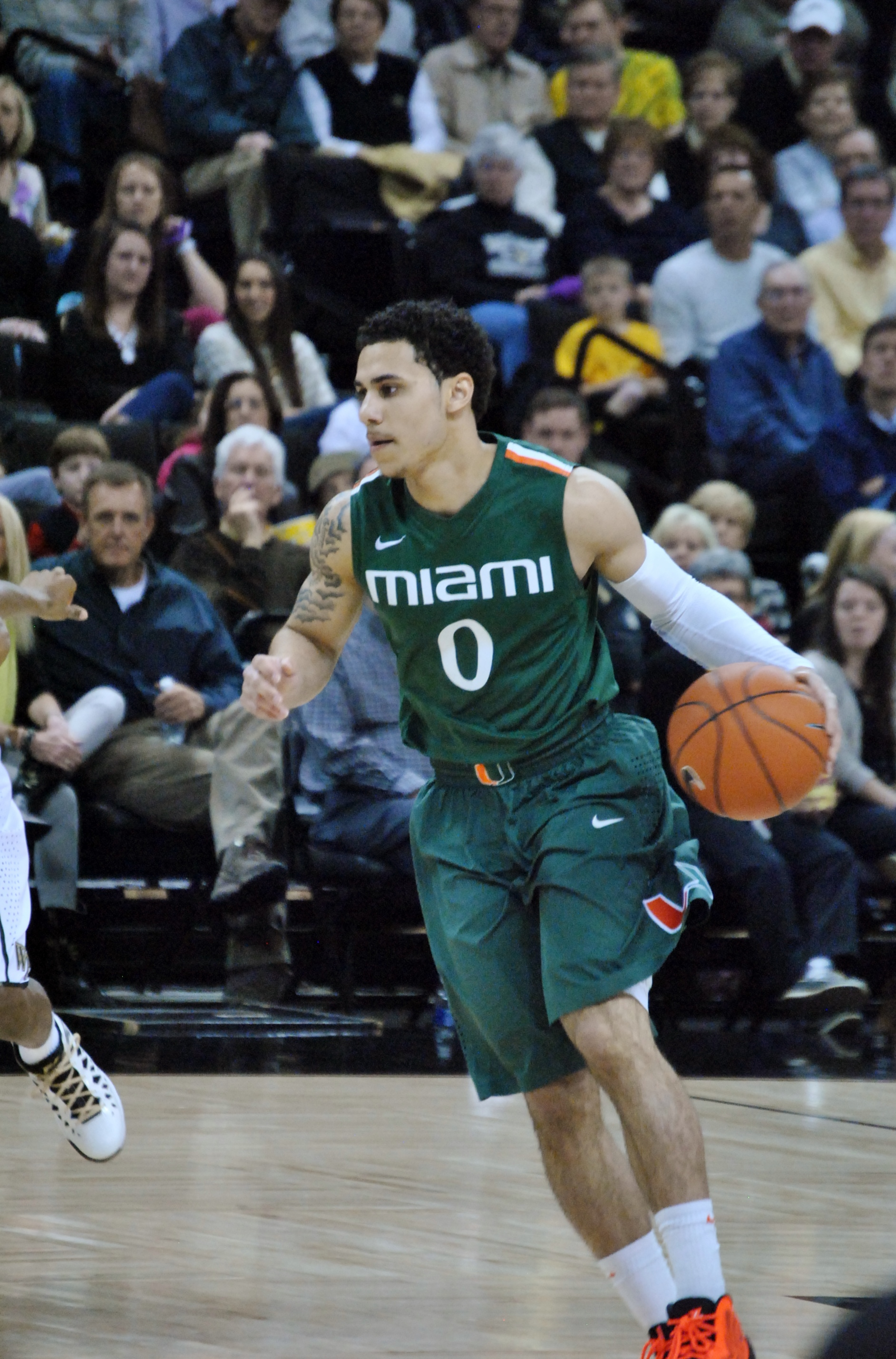
Shane Larkin, Lute Olson National Player of the Year in 2013

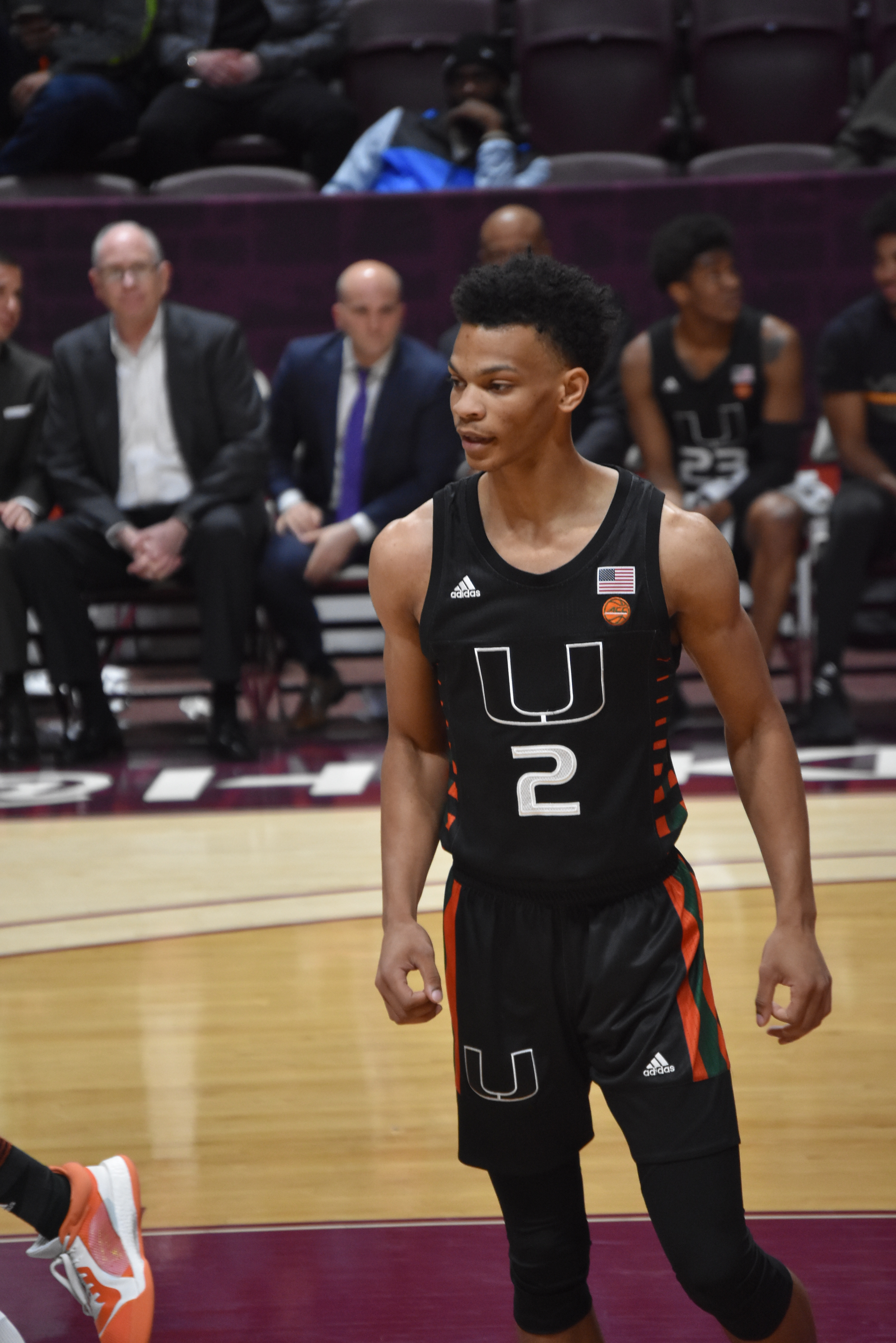
Isaiah Wong, ACC Player of the Year in 2023

=== Retired numbers ===
No.	Player	Pos.	Tenure	No. ret.	Ref.
24	Rick Barry	SF	1962–65	1976	
40	Tim James	SF	1995–99	1999	

=== Honored jerseys ===
"Honored" players are those former athletes who have had their jerseys hanging at the Watsco Center rafters, although those numbers are not officially retired.

No.	Player	Pos.	Tenure	Honored
13	Dick Hickox	G	1958–61	2010
11	Don Curnutt	SG	1967–70	2010
33	Jack McClinton	SG	2006–09	2010

=== National Player of the Year ===
2013 – Shane Larkin, Lute Olson National Player of the Year

=== All-Americans ===
- 1960 – Dick Hickox, AP Second Team
- 1965 – Rick Barry, Consensus First Team
- 1970 – Don Curnutt, Helms Second Team
- 1999 – Tim James, AP Third Team
- 2013 – Shane Larkin, AP, NABC Second Team, Sporting News Third Team, John Wooden All-American, Bob Cousy Award Finalist, John R. Wooden Award Finalist
- 2023 – Isaiah Wong, NABC Third Team

=== ACC Player of the Year ===
2013 – Shane Larkin (Coaches)
2023 – Isaiah Wong

=== All-ACC Teams ===
First Team All-ACC

- Jack McClinton, 2008, 2009
- Shane Larkin, 2013
- Kameron McGusty, 2022
- Isaiah Wong, 2023
- Malik Reneau, 2026

Second Team All-ACC

- Guillermo Diaz, 2005, 2006
- Kenny Kadji, 2013
- Sheldon McClellan, 2016
- Jordan Miller, 2023
- Norchad Omier, 2024
- Tre Donaldson, 2026

Third Team All-ACC

- Robert Hite, 2006
- Jack McClinton, 2007
- Malcolm Grant, 2011
- Kenny Kadji, 2012
- Rion Brown, 2014
- Tonye Jekiri, 2016
- Isaiah Wong, 2022
- Norchad Omier, 2023

ACC All-Rookie Team

- Durand Scott, 2010
- Shane Larkin, 2012

ACC All-Defensive Team

- Anthony King, 2005
- Shane Larkin, 2013
- Durand Scott, 2013
- Tonye Jekiri, 2015, 2016
- Charlie Moore, 2022

ACC All-Tournament Team

- Shane Larkin, 2013 (MVP)
- Durand Scott, 2013
- Julian Gamble, 2013 (2nd Team)
- Trey McKinney-Jones, 2013 (2nd Team)

=== Big East Player of the Year ===
1999 – Tim James

=== All-Big East Teams ===
First Team All-Big East

- Tim James, 1998, 1999
- Johnny Hemsley, 1999

Second Team All-Big East

- Tim James, 1997
- Johnny Hemsley, 2000
- Darius Rice, 2002, 2004
- John Salmons, 2002

Third Team All-Big East

- Constantin Popa, 1993, 1995
- Mario Bland, 2000
- John Salmons, 2001
- James Jones, 2002
- Darius Rice, 2003

Big East All-Rookie Team

- Steven Edwards, 1993
- Kevin Norris, 1995
- Tim James, 1996
- Darius Rice, 2001
- Guillermo Diaz, 2004

Big East All-Tournament Team

- Jerome Scott, 1992
- Tim James, 1999
- Marcus Barnes, 2002

=== All-time leaders ===
==== Points ====
Rank	Player	Years	Points
1.	Rick Barry	1962–65	2,298
2.	Eric Brown	1985–89	2,270
3.	Don Curnutt	1967–70	2,006
4.	Darius Rice	2000–04	1,865
5.	Robert Hite	2002–06	1,717
6.	Tim James	1995–99	1,713
7.	Jack McClinton	2006–09	1,702
8.	Durand Scott	2009–13	1,650
9.	Dennis Burns	1985–89	1,594
10.	Dick Hickox	1958–61	1,529

==== Rebounds ====
Rank	Player	Years	Rebounds
1.	Rick Barry	1962–65	1,274
2.	Will Allen	1968–71	916
3.	Harry Manushaw	1958–61	914
4.	Tonye Jekiri	2012–16	901
5.	Mike McCoy	1960–63	857
6.	Tim James	1995–99	856
7.	Eric Brown	1985–89	855
8.	Reggie Johnson	2009–13	842
9.	Anthony King	2003–08	824
10.	Edwin Morris	1955–58	787

==== Assists ====
Rank	Player	Years	Assists
1.	Vernon Jennings	1996–00	520
2.	Kevin Norris	1994–98	493
3.	John Salmons	1998–02	429
4.	Kevin Presto	1985–89	412
5.	Durand Scott	2009–13	404
6.	Thomas Hocker	1987–90	384
7.	Anthony Harris	2002–07	330
8.	Michael Gardner	1991–94	319
9.	Steven Edwards	1992–96	312
10.	Malcolm Grant	2009–12	292

==== Steals ====
Rank	Player	Years	Steals
1.	Kevin Norris	1994–98	208
2.	Vernon Jennings	1996–00	199
3.	John Salmons	1998–02	192
4.	Robert Hite	2002–06	187
4.	Jerome Scott	1988–92	187
6.	Jake Morton	1988–93	167
7.	Durand Scott	2009–13	166
8.	Kevin Presto	1985–89	154
9.	Anthony Lawrence	2015–19	144
10.	Mike Simmons	1998–03	141

==== Blocks ====
Rank	Player	Years	Blocks
1.	Constantin Popa	1991–95	263
2.	Tim James	1995–99	224
3.	Anthony King	2003–08	219
4.	James Jones	1999–03	192
5.	Julian Gamble	2008–13	132
6.	Tonye Jekiri	2012–16	126
7.	Tito Horford	1986–88	125
8.	Dennis Burns	1985–89	123
9.	Elton Tyler	1997–02	114
10.	Reggie Johnson	2009–13	113

=== NBA draft selections ===
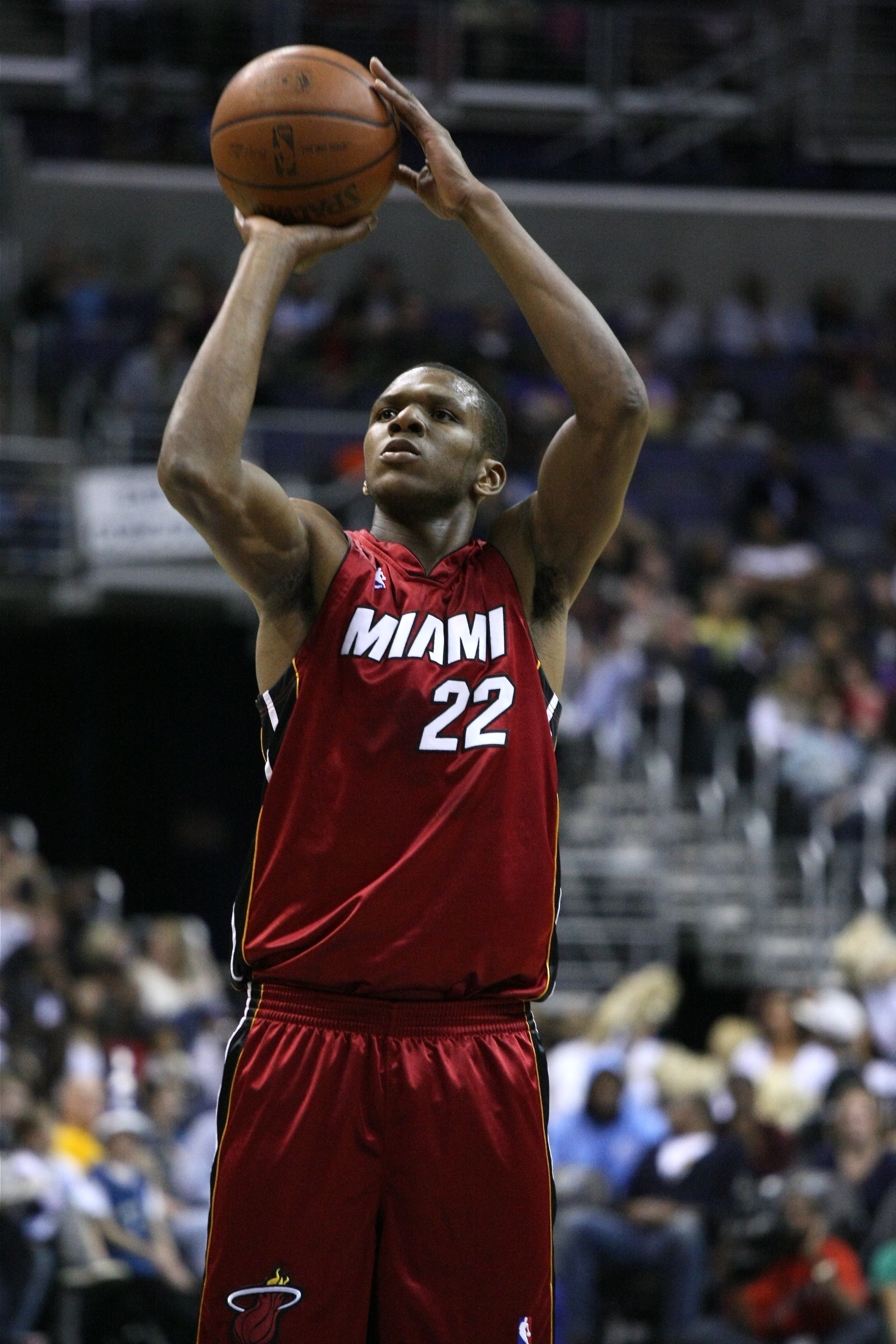
James Jones: 3× NBA champion, NBA Three-Point Contest champion (2011), NBA Executive of the Year (2021) and vice president of basketball operations for the NBA

26 former Miami players have been drafted into the NBA:

- Kyshawn George, 2024: 1st round, 24th overall pick
- Jordan Miller, 2023: 2nd round, 48th overall pick
- Isaiah Wong, 2023: 2nd round, 55th overall pick
- Dewan Hernandez, 2019: 2nd round, 59th overall pick
- Lonnie Walker IV, 2018: 1st round, 18th overall pick
- Bruce Brown, 2018: 2nd round, 42nd overall pick
- Davon Reed, 2017: 2nd round, 32nd overall pick
- Shane Larkin, 2013: 1st round, 18th overall pick
- Dwayne Collins, 2010: 2nd round, 60th overall pick
- Jack McClinton, 2009: 2nd round, 51st overall pick
- Guillermo Díaz, 2006: 2nd round, 52nd overall pick
- James Jones, 2003: 2nd round, 49th overall pick
- John Salmons, 2002: 1st round, 26th overall pick
- Tim James, 1999: 1st round, 25th overall pick
- Constantin Popa, 1995: 2nd round, 53rd overall pick
- Joe Wylie, 1991: 2nd round, 38th overall pick
- Tito Horford, 1988: 2nd round, 39th overall pick
- Willie Allen, 1971: 4th round, 60th pick overall
- Don Curnutt, 1970: 10th round, 170th overall
- Wayne Canaday, 1970: 15th round, 218th overall
- Rusty Parker, 1968: 5th round, 61st overall
- Bill Soens, 1968: 11th round, 145th overall
- Mike Wittman, 1967
- Rick Barry, 1965: 1st round, 2nd overall pick
- Mike McCoy, 1963: 3rd round, 22nd overall
- Dick Miani, 1956: 11th round, 80th overall

== Coaches ==
#	Name	Term	GC	W	L	Win%	Achievements	Reference
1	Art Webb	1926–28, 1930–31	30	18	12	.600		
2	Tom McCann	1928–29, 1931–32	37	30	7	.811		
3	Hart Morris	1938–42, 1946–52	201	119	82	.592		
4	W.H. Steers	1945–46	13	8	5	.615		
5	Dave Wike	1952–54	36	14	22	.389		
6	Bruce Hale	1954–67	332	220	112	.663		
7	Ron Godfrey	1967–71	104	47	57	.452		
University of Miami men's basketball program on hiatus from 1971–72 through 1984–85 seasons
8	Bill Foster	1985–90	149	78	71	.523		
9	Leonard Hamilton	1990–2000	291	144	147	.495		
10	Perry Clark	2000–04	119	65	54	.546		
11	Frank Haith	2004–11	230	129	101	.561		
12	Jim Larrañaga	2011–2024	448	274	174	.612	ACC Coach of the Year, 2013 and 2016; Henry Iba Award (Coach of the Year), 2013; Associated Press (Coach of the Year), 2013; Naismith Award (Coach of the Year), 2013	
13	Bill Courtney	2024–2025 (interim)	19	3	16	.158		
14	Jai Lucas	2025–	35	26	9	.743		

== Storm Surge ==
=== Origins ===
Storm Surge is the official student section of Miami Hurricanes men's and women's basketball. It was founded in 2011. Prior to Storm Surge's creation, Miami had been victim to years of inconsistent student attendance and a lack of student interest in the basketball program, and prior attempts to create a lasting student section such as "UBeach" and "Haith's Faithful" were largely unsuccessful. Storm Surge works directly with Miami's athletic department to enhance the game day experience and encourage greater involvement from the student body. Storm Surge began with 500 members, but saw average student attendance jump to over 1,100 for ACC games in 2012–2013, its second season. As student capacity at the BUC is limited, students are admitted on a first-come, first-served basis, with students often arriving hours beforehand or camping out to get the best seats.

=== Traditions ===
Storm Surge has become famous for its creative and unique free throw chants and distractions, digging up embarrassing facts and pictures of opposing players, and its slogan, "Pack The BUC," which can be seen on T-shirts, signs, and promotional materials at University of Miami home games. Like many student sections, Storm Surge distributes cheer sheets prior to each game, detailing specific cheers for that game. The group also has the ability to create cheers on the fly through the use of a large whiteboard at the front of the student section, which is used to coordinate all cheers.

Storm Surge's official color is orange, and all members wear orange to every game. The student section is situated behind both baskets and consists of bleacher seating and traditional seating. As bleacher seating is closest to the floor, the students in the bleachers are typically the team's biggest supporters. Before each game, Storm Surge sings the national anthem together, even if the anthem is being sung by an individual performer. During opposing teams' introductions, students turn around to face away from the court and throw up "The U." During Miami's home introductions, the student section links arms and rocks left to right, going faster and faster before erupting into cheers for the Hurricanes. For Miami's free throws, students hold up one finger, all jumping once on a made free throw and twice on the second free throw if both free throws are made.

Storm Surge also organizes watch parties and live online blogs for every away game. These events are open to all students and typically take place on campus. Following major road wins, the group gathers at the BankUnited Center to greet and congratulate the returning Hurricanes team, a tradition that has since carried over to football. Membership in the organization also entitles students to exclusive meet and greets with players, priority seating to games, and promotions and giveaways.

=== Larrañaga Lawn ===
In 2013, due to unprecedented demand for student tickets to the January 23 game against the #1 ranked Duke Blue Devils, students camped out on an adjacent field to the BankUnited Center, which was promptly dubbed "Larrañaga Lawn," after Coach Jim Larrañaga. Students camped out for several other games during the 2012–2013 season, including sold out contests against FSU and UNC. Coach Jim Larrañaga and members of the team always greet students lined up on Larrañaga Lawn both the night before the game and again on game day, often bringing food to students in line. Lawn sports such as football, frisbee, and Kan-jam have become popular ways for students in line to pass the time on Larrañaga Lawn.

=== National attention ===
Storm Surge made national headlines in 2012 during Miami's home game against UNC, when students chanted "Austin Rivers" at UNC free throw shooter Tyler Zeller, whom Rivers had hit a buzzer beater over in UNC's previous game. Storm Surge was again in the national spotlight following Miami's 90–63 rout of Duke in January 2013 when students rushed the court in celebration. The student section has been praised by many notable visitors, including: Jimmy Graham, Warren Sapp, Dick Vitale, and Carlos Boozer.

In 2013, Storm Surge received a number of accolades, including three of the "Best Fan Signs in College Basketball" by USA Today and was featured on national programs such as PTI, SportsCenter, and CBS's documentary "March Madness Fandemonium". It was recognized as one of the toughest ACC venues by ESPN during numerous broadcasts throughout the season. On January 24, 2013, Storm Surge was featured on the front page of The Miami Herald following Miami's win over Duke. On February 9, 2013, Storm Surge was featured on the landing page of ESPN.com following Miami's blowout home win over UNC.

After losing its flair following some up-and-down seasons, the student section was renamed to "The Eye" at the start of the 2021-22 season. More about The Eye can be found on Category 5's page, which is the University of Miami's official student school spirit organization.

== Facilities ==
=== Miami Beach Convention Center ===
The Hurricanes played their home games at the Miami Beach Convention Center from 1956 to 1971.

=== James L. Knight Center (1985–1988) ===
On November 12, 1985, the Knight Sports Complex was dedicated at a gala banquet that was held on the basketball courts of the new structure. CBS basketball analyst Billy Packer served as the evening’s guest speaker for an event that welcomed more than 500 guests to the on-campus home of Hurricane basketball. The facility served as the practice home to the men’s and women’s basketball programs, while also housing the men’s basketball coaching staff offices until the team moved to Miami Arena in 1988. In addition, the Knight Sports Complex enabled the athletic program to more than double the size of the existing strength room, while also providing meeting rooms and lecture rooms for all of Miami’s student-athletes.

=== Miami Arena (1988–2002) ===
The Hurricanes called Miami Arena home from 1988 until December 2002. The downtown arena attracted large crowds for marquee opponents as the program began play in the Big East Conference in 1991. The school shared the facility with the NBA's Miami Heat and the NHL's Florida Panthers until each respective professional franchise built newer stadiums.

=== Watsco Center (2002–present) ===
After years of planning, Hurricanes basketball finally moved on-campus on January 4, 2003 when the Hurricanes defeated No. 22 North Carolina in overtime to christen the opening of the Convocation Center (nicknamed the "Convo"). The $48 million facility was funded through private donations, though it was renamed the BankUnited Center in 2005. In 2016, the university announced the renaming of the facility as the Watsco Center.
