= Kameron McGusty =

American basketball player (born 1997)

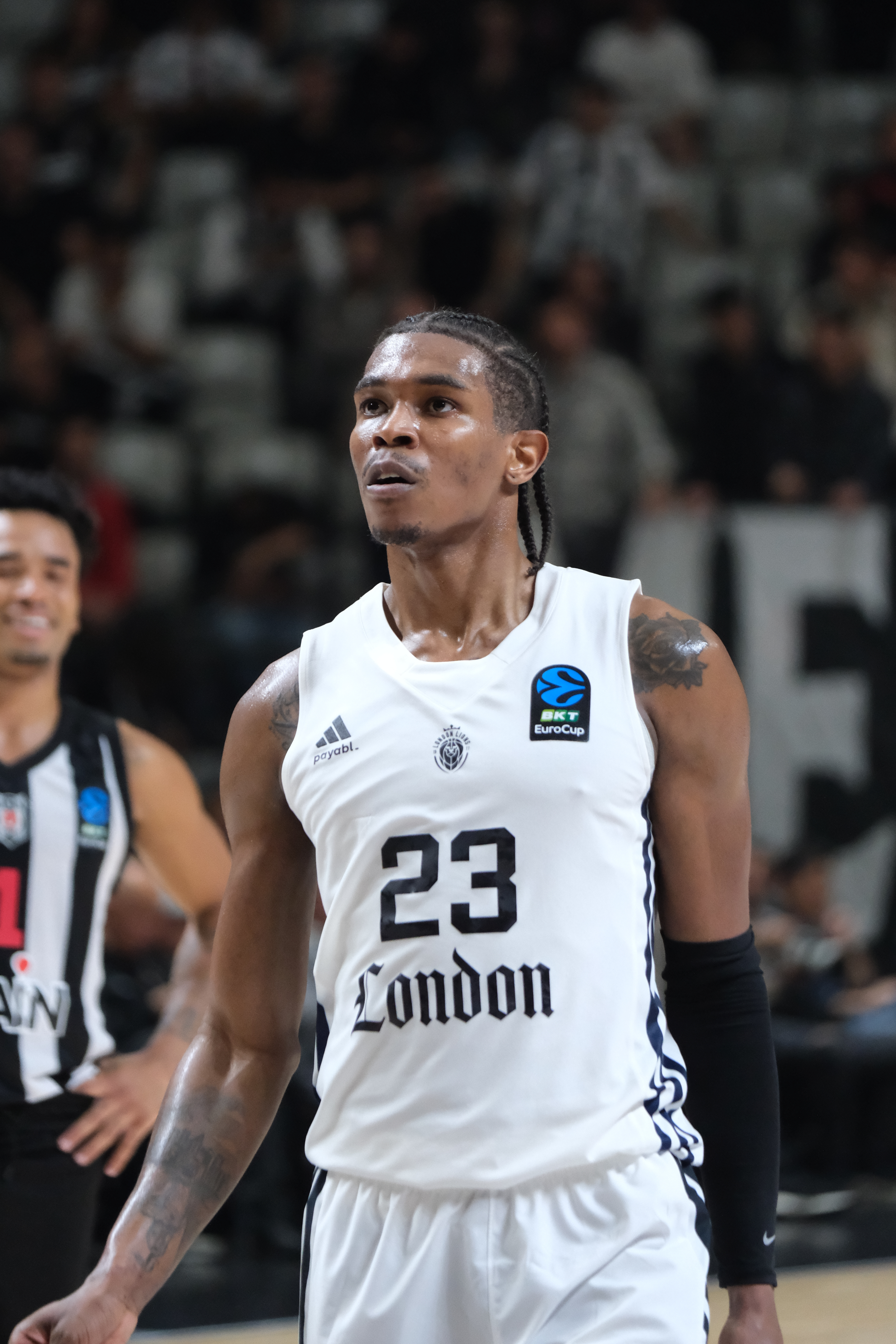
- McGusty with the London Lions in 2025

No. 0 – Yokohama B-Corsairs
- Position: Shooting guard / small forward
- League: B.League

Personal information
- Born: September 9, 1997 (age 29) Houston, Texas, U.S.
- Listed height: 6 ft 5 in (1.96 m)
- Listed weight: 190 lb (86 kg)

Career information
- High school: Seven Lakes (Katy, Texas); Sunrise Christian Academy (Bel Aire, Kansas)
- College: Oklahoma (2016–2018); Miami (Florida) (2019–2022)
- NBA draft: 2022: undrafted
- Playing career: 2023–present

Career history
- 2022–2023: UCC Assigeco Piacenza
- 2023–2024: Limoges CSP
- 2024–2025: Legia Warsaw
- 2025–2026: London Lions
- 2026–present: Yokohama B-Corsairs

Career highlights
- PLK champion (2025); PLK Finals MVP (2025); PLK Most Valuable Player (2025); All-PLK Team (2025); PLK Top Scorer (2025); First-team All-ACC (2022); Big 12 All-Newcomer Team (2017)

Kameron Alexander McGusty (born September 9, 1997) is an American-Guyanese professional basketball player for the Yokohama B-Corsairs of the B.League. He played college basketball for the Miami Hurricanes of the Atlantic Coast Conference (ACC), and the Oklahoma Sooners.

== High school career ==
McGusty began his high school career at Seven Lakes High School in Katy, Texas. After starting on junior varsity his freshman year, he won district MVP on varsity as a sophomore. As a junior, he averaged 22 points per game. Wanting to play against better competition, McGusty transferred for his senior season to Sunrise Christian Academy in Kansas. A four-star recruit, McGusty committed to playing college basketball for Oklahoma in July 2015, choosing the Sooners over offers from Florida, Texas, Indiana, and Louisville, among others.

== College career ==
As a freshman, McGusty averaged 10.9 points and 2.2 rebounds per game. He earned honorable mention All-Big 12 honors and was named to the Big 12 All-Newcomer team. McGusty's production declined to 8 points and 1.9 rebounds per game as a sophomore. In April 2018, he announced he was transferring to Miami.

McGusty averaged 12.5 points, 4 rebounds and 1.6 assists per game as a junior. As a senior, McGusty averaged 13.3 points, 3.8 rebounds and 2.8 assists per game. Following the season, he declared for the 2021 NBA draft, but ultimately withdrew to take advantage of a fifth season of eligibility granted due to the COVID-19 pandemic. On December 8, 2021, McGusty scored a career-high 29 points in a 76–59 victory against Lipscomb. On January 8, 2022, he had 14 points and hit the go-ahead layup with 20 seconds remaining in a 76–74 upset of second-ranked Duke. McGusty was named to the First Team All-ACC.

== Professional career ==
=== UCA Assigeco Piacenza (2022–2023) ===
Kameron spent his first professional season in Italy, playing for UCC Assigeco Piacenza and averaged 19.3 points, 4.0 rebounds and 1.7 assists through 21 games played.

=== Limoges CSP (2023–2024) ===
On June 24, 2023, he signed with Limoges CSP of the LNB Pro A.

=== Legia Warsaw (2024–2025) ===
On July 19, 2024, McGusty signed with Legia Warsaw of Polish Basketball League (PLK).

=== London Lions (2025–2026) ===
On July 28, 2025, McGusty signed with the London Lions of the Super League Basketball (SLB).

=== Yokohama B-Corsairs (2026–present) ===
On June 24, 2026, McGusty signed with the Yokohama B-Corsairs of the Japanese B.League.

== Career statistics ==
Legend
GP	Games played	GS	Games started	MPG	Minutes per game
FG%	Field goal percentage	3P%	3-point field goal percentage	FT%	Free throw percentage
RPG	Rebounds per game	APG	Assists per game	SPG	Steals per game
BPG	Blocks per game	PPG	Points per game	**Bold**	Career high

=== College ===
Year	Team	GP	GS	MPG	FG%	3P%	FT%	RPG	APG	SPG	BPG	PPG
2016–17	Oklahoma	31	17	24.9	.430	**.352**	.778	2.2	.9	.8	**.3**	10.9
2017–18	Oklahoma	**32**	8	18.5	.423	.333	.750	1.9	.3	.3	.0	8.0
2018–19	Miami	Redshirt										
2019–20	Miami	28	**21**	29.5	.435	.328	.750	**4.0**	1.6	.7	.2	12.5
2020–21	Miami	20	18	**33.3**	**.445**	.320	**.821**	3.8	**2.8**	**1.3**	.1	**13.3**
Career		111	64	25.7	.433	.334	.774	2.8	1.2	.7	.1	10.9

== Personal life ==
McGusty is the son of Kerol McGusty and Julie Winn. His father played basketball at Stephen F. Austin for two seasons.
