= Isaiah Wong =

American basketball player (born 2001)

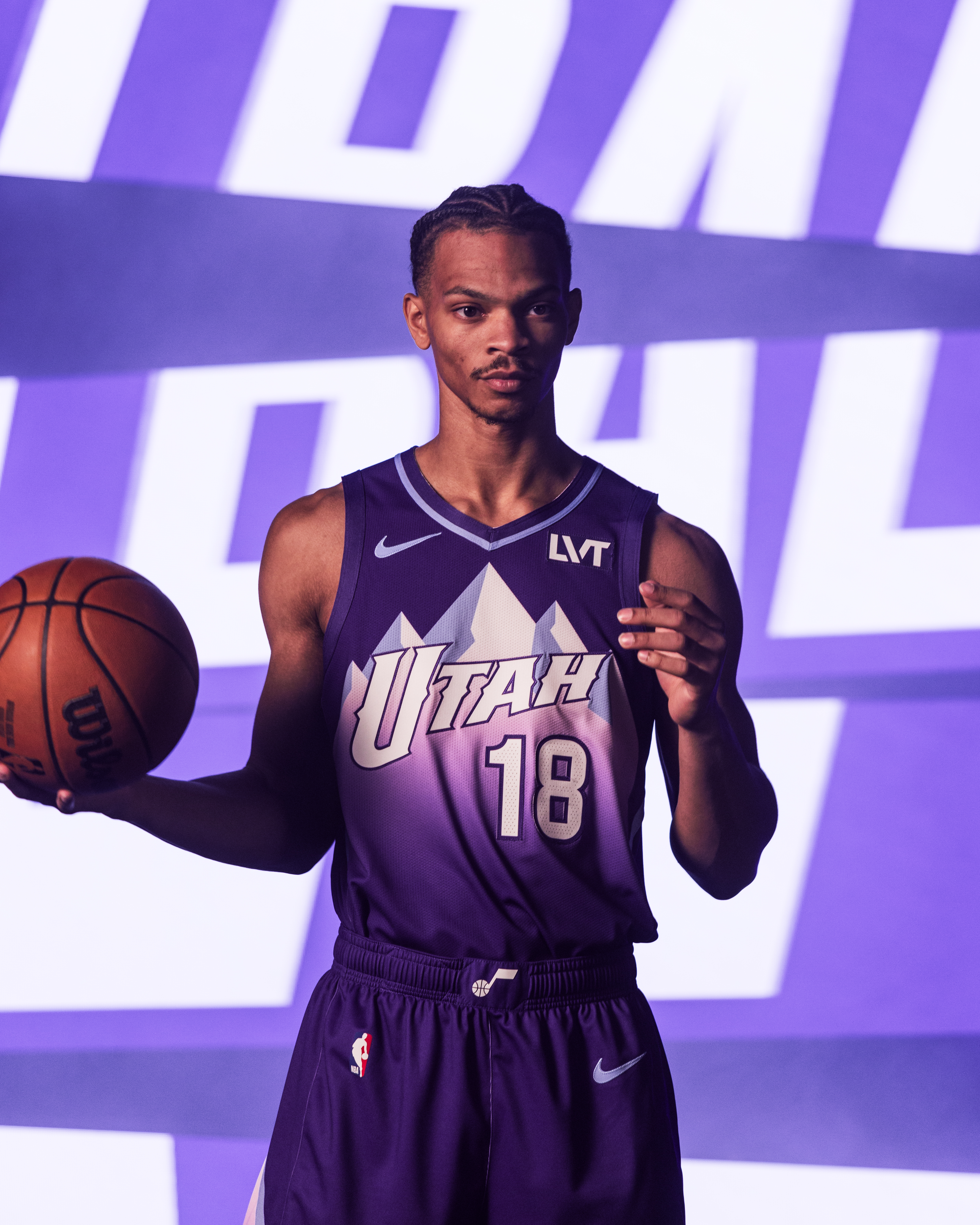
- Wong with Utah Jazz in 2024

No. 21 – Long Island Nets
- Position: Shooting guard / point guard
- League: NBA G League

Personal information
- Born: January 28, 2001 (age 25) Piscataway, New Jersey, U.S.
- Listed height: 6 ft 3 in (1.91 m)
- Listed weight: 185 lb (84 kg)

Career information
- High school: Notre Dame (Lawrenceville, New Jersey); Bonner & Prendergast (Drexel Hill, Pennsylvania)
- College: Miami (Florida) (2019–2023)
- NBA draft: 2023: 2nd round, 55th overall pick
- Drafted by: Indiana Pacers
- Playing career: 2023–present

Career history
- 2023–2024: Indiana Pacers
- 2023–2024: →Indiana Mad Ants
- 2024: Salt Lake City Stars
- 2024–2025: Charlotte Hornets
- 2024–2025: →Greensboro Swarm
- 2025: Žalgiris Kaunas
- 2025–2026: Gran Canaria
- 2026–present: Long Island Nets

Career highlights
- LKL champion (2025); NBA G League Next Up Game (2024); Third-team All-American – NABC (2023); ACC Player of the Year (2023); First-team All-ACC (2023); 2× Third-team All-ACC (2021, 2022)
- Stats at NBA.com
- Stats at Basketball Reference

Isaiah Robert-Johan Wong (born January 28, 2001) is an American professional basketball player for the Long Island Nets of the NBA G League. He played college basketball for the Miami Hurricanes of the Atlantic Coast Conference (ACC). Wong earned third-team All-American honors as a senior in 2023, when he was also named the ACC Player of the Year. He was selected by the Pacers in the second round of the 2023 NBA draft.

== Early life ==
Born in Piscataway, New Jersey, Wong played prep basketball at Notre Dame High School in Lawrenceville, New Jersey during his first two years.

For his junior season, he transferred to Bonner & Prendergast Catholic High School in Drexel Hill, Pennsylvania. As a junior, he averaged 22.2 points, 6.5 rebounds and 3.6 assists per game, leading his team to the Philadelphia Catholic League regular season title, and was named Catholic League MVP.

In his senior season, Wong averaged 21.9 points, 7.5 rebounds and 2.5 assists per game. He led his team to the Class 4A state title game and repeated as Catholic League MVP. He committed to playing college basketball for Miami (Florida) over offers from Villanova, UConn, Clemson and Pittsburgh.

== College career ==
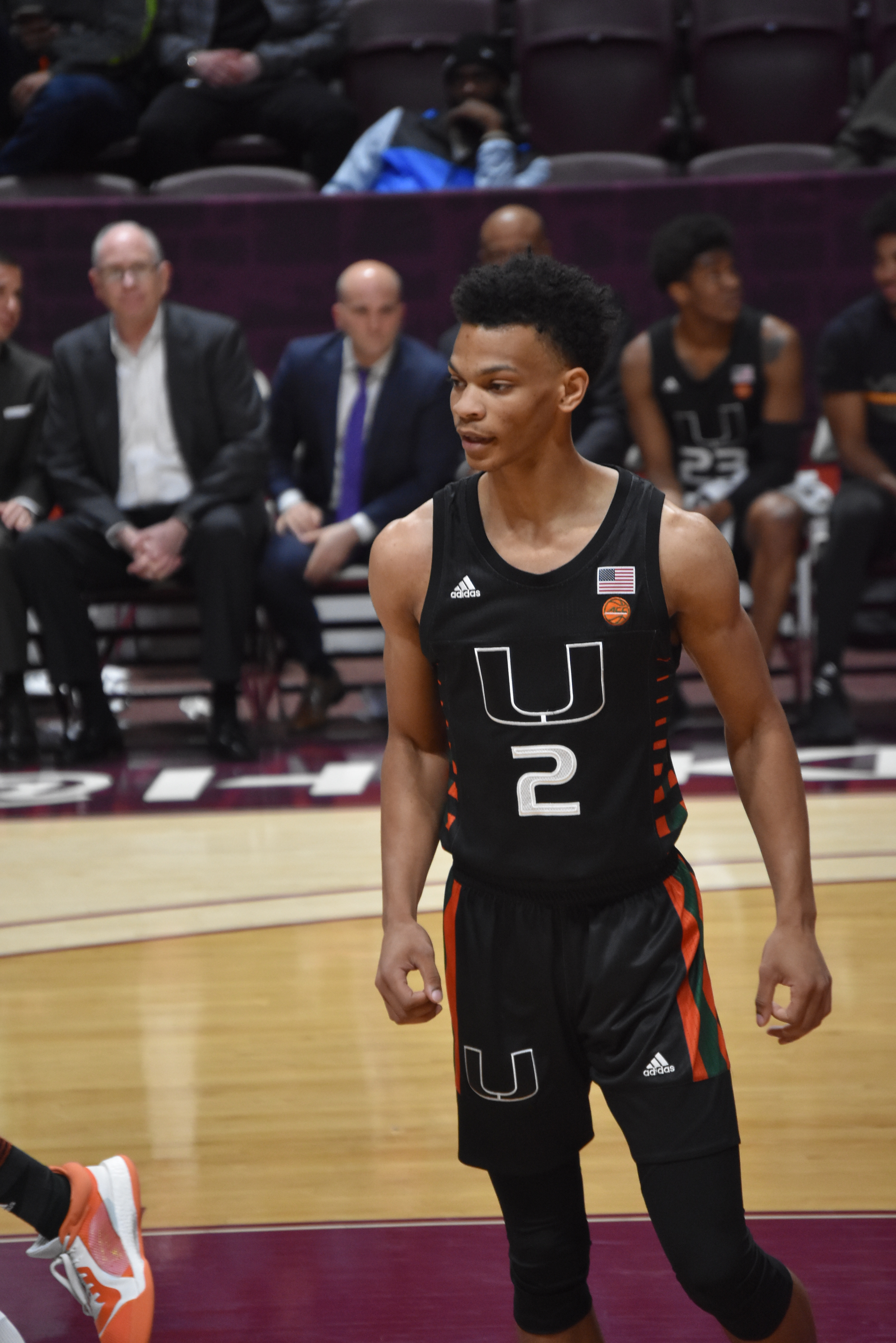
Wong with the Miami Hurricanes

On February 9, 2020, Wong recorded a freshman season-high 27 points and 12 rebounds, making all 14 of his free throws, in a 102–95 win over Virginia Tech in triple overtime. As a freshman, he averaged 7.7 points and three rebounds per game.

On January 16, 2021, Wong posted a career-high 30 points, seven rebounds and six assists in a 78–72 victory against Louisville. As a sophomore, he averaged 17.1 points, 4.8 rebounds and 2.4 assists per game, earning third-team All-ACC honors. On April 14, 2021, Wong declared for the 2021 NBA draft while maintaining his college eligibility. He ultimately returned for his junior season. Wong was named to the third-team All-ACC as a junior. He was the second-leading scorer on the team, which advanced to the Elite Eight of the 2022 NCAA tournament. After the season, he again declared for the draft while maintaining his eligibility. In 2023 he was named the ACC Player of the Year and helped Miami reach their first-ever Final Four.

== Professional career ==
=== Indiana Pacers / Mad Ants (2023–2024) ===
Wong was selected by the Indiana Pacers with the 55th overall pick in the second round of the 2023 NBA draft, subsequently joining the team for the 2023 NBA Summer League. On July 3, 2023, he signed a two-way contract with the Pacers, splitting time with their NBA G League affiliate, the Indiana Mad Ants. He made his NBA debut in the 2023 NBA In-Season Tournament final, appearing briefly in the final minute of the game as the Pacers lost 109–123 to the Lakers.

=== Utah Jazz / Salt Lake City Stars (2024) ===
On September 27, 2024, Wong signed with the Utah Jazz, but was waived on October 8. On October 28, he joined their NBA G League affiliate Salt Lake City Stars.

=== Charlotte Hornets / Greensboro Swarm (2024–2025) ===
On December 2, 2024, Wong signed a two-way contract with the Charlotte Hornets. On February 13, 2025, Wong was waived by the Hornets.

=== Žalgiris Kaunas (2025) ===
On February 26, 2025, Wong signed with Lithuanian club Žalgiris Kaunas for the remainder of the season. On April 13 of the same year, he agreed on a three-year contract extension. After re-signing, Wong started getting less minutes from Žalgiris head coach Andrea Trinchieri, and despite helping Žalgiris regain the LKL championship, with a change in the team's direction, Wong and Žalgiris mutually terminated the contract.

=== Gran Canaria (2025–2026) ===
On August 2, 2025, Wong signed with Gran Canaria of the Liga ACB.

=== Long Island Nets (2026) ===
On September 15, 2026, Wong signed with the Brooklyn Nets, but was waived the same day.

== Career statistics ==
Legend
GP	Games played	GS	Games started	MPG	Minutes per game
FG%	Field goal percentage	3P%	3-point field goal percentage	FT%	Free throw percentage
RPG	Rebounds per game	APG	Assists per game	SPG	Steals per game
BPG	Blocks per game	PPG	Points per game	**Bold**	Career high

=== NBA ===
==== Regular season ====
Year	Team	GP	GS	MPG	FG%	3P%	FT%	RPG	APG	SPG	BPG	PPG
2023–24	Indiana	1	0	4.3	.333	.000	—	.0	.0	.0	.0	2.0
2024–25	Charlotte	**20**	0	**13.3**	**.390**	**.394**	.735	**1.6**	**1.4**	**.6**	.0	**6.0**
Career		21	0	12.8	.389	.382	.735	1.5	1.3	.5	.0	5.8

=== College ===
Year	Team	GP	GS	MPG	FG%	3P%	FT%	RPG	APG	SPG	BPG	PPG
2019–20	Miami	31	13	21.2	.416	.373	.829	3.0	1.0	.5	.4	7.7
2020–21	Miami	27	26	**35.5**	.431	.347	.803	**4.8**	2.4	1.1	**.5**	**17.1**
2021–22	Miami	**37**	36	33.9	**.452**	.302	.748	4.3	2.0	.9	.3	15.3
2022–23	Miami	**37**	**37**	33.4	.445	**.384**	**.845**	4.3	**3.2**	**1.4**	.4	16.2
Career		132	112	31.1	.440	.347	.807	4.1	2.2	1.0	.4	14.1

== Personal life ==
Wong is the son of Terrence and LaChelle Wong. His paternal great-grandfather was Chinese. In 2022, Wong starred in the short film, Top Shot.
