= Cason Wallace =

American basketball player (born 2003)

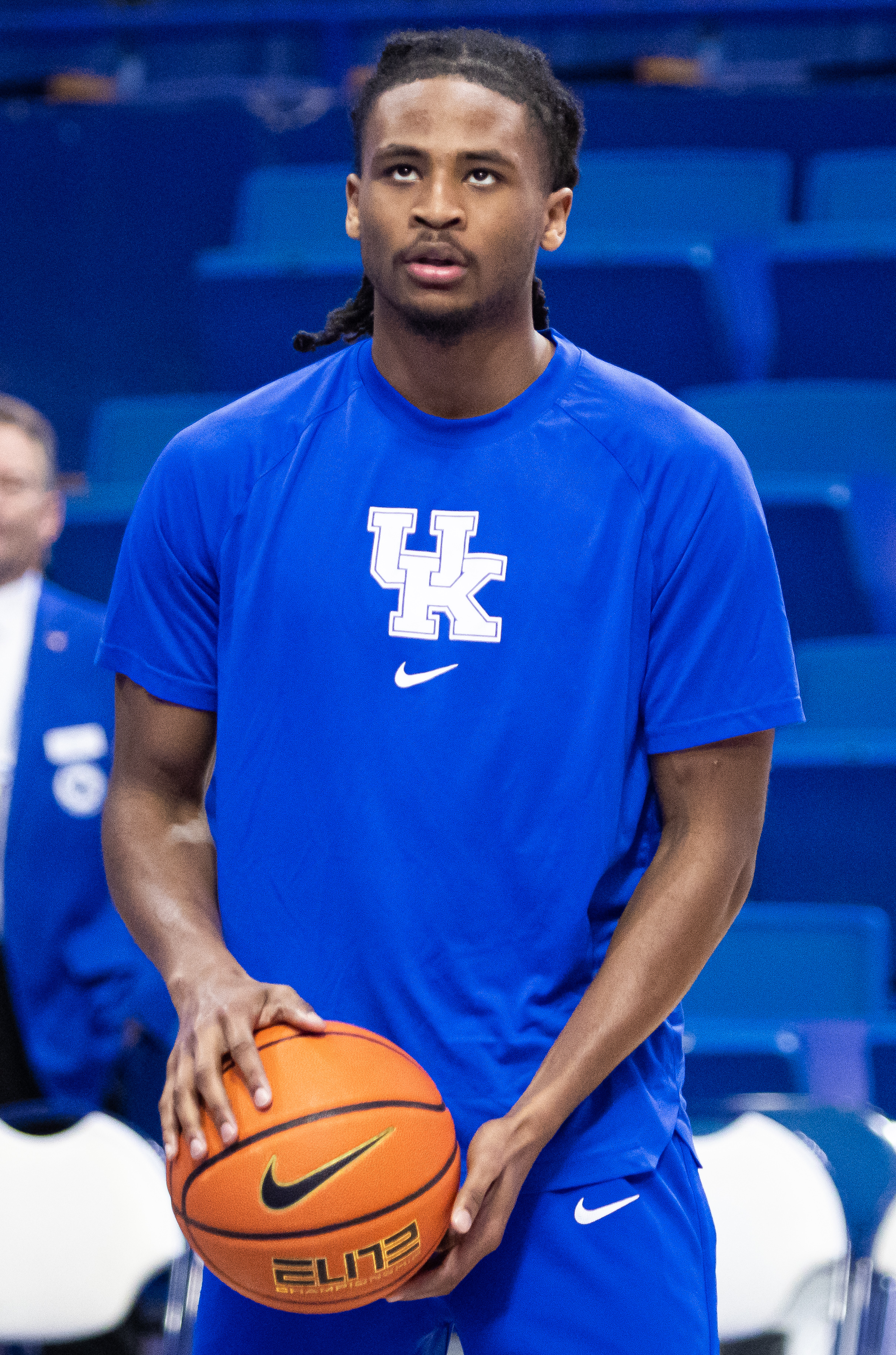
- Wallace with Kentucky in 2023

No. 22 – Oklahoma City Thunder
- Position: Shooting guard / point guard
- League: NBA

Personal information
- Born: November 7, 2003 (age 23) Dallas, Texas, U.S.
- Listed height: 6 ft 3 in (1.91 m)
- Listed weight: 195 lb (88 kg)

Career information
- High school: Richardson (Richardson, Texas)
- College: Kentucky (2022–2023)
- NBA draft: 2023: 1st round, 10th overall pick
- Drafted by: Dallas Mavericks
- Playing career: 2023–present

Career history
- 2023–present: Oklahoma City Thunder

Career highlights
- NBA champion (2025); NBA All-Defensive Second Team (2026); NBA All-Rookie Second Team (2024); McDonald's All-American (2022)
- Stats at NBA.com
- Stats at Basketball Reference

Cason David Wallace (/ˈkeɪsən, keɪˈsɒn/ KAY-sən, kay-SON; born November 7, 2003) is an American professional basketball player for the Oklahoma City Thunder of the National Basketball Association (NBA). He was a consensus five-star recruit and a top five player in the 2022 class. He played one season of college basketball for the Kentucky Wildcats before being selected 10th overall by the Mavericks in the 2023 NBA draft, and subsequently traded to the Thunder. He won an NBA championship with the Thunder in 2025.

== High school career ==
Wallace attended Richardson High School in Richardson, Texas where he played alongside of Rylan Griffen under coach Kevin Lawson and assistant coach Mike Bangs. As a senior, he was the Gatorade Basketball Player of the Year for Texas and The Dallas Morning News boys basketball Player of the Year after averaging 19.9 points, 7.4 rebounds and 6.1 assists per game. He was selected to play in the 2022 McDonald's All-American Game and the Jordan Brand Classic. A five-star recruit, Wallace committed to the University of Kentucky to play college basketball.

== Professional career ==
The Dallas Mavericks selected Wallace with the tenth overall pick in the 2023 NBA draft then traded him, along with Dāvis Bertāns, to the Oklahoma City Thunder in exchange for the 12th overall pick, Dereck Lively II.

Wallace averaged 8.4 points, 3.4 rebounds, and 2.5 assists across 68 regular-season games before a shoulder injury sidelined him late in the year. Fully recovered for the postseason, Wallace returned to play in every game of the 2025 NBA Playoffs, helping the Oklahoma City Thunder clinch the franchise’s first NBA championship with a victory over the Indiana Pacers.

On May 22, 2026, Wallace was named to the NBA All-Defensive Second Team.

== Career statistics ==
Legend
GP	Games played	GS	Games started	MPG	Minutes per game
FG%	Field goal percentage	3P%	3-point field goal percentage	FT%	Free throw percentage
RPG	Rebounds per game	APG	Assists per game	SPG	Steals per game
BPG	Blocks per game	PPG	Points per game	**Bold**	Career high
†	Won an NBA championship	*	Led the league

=== NBA ===
==== Regular season ====
Year	Team	GP	GS	MPG	FG%	3P%	FT%	RPG	APG	SPG	BPG	PPG
2023–24	Oklahoma City	**82**	13	20.6	**.491**	**.419**	.784	2.3	1.5	.9	**.5**	6.8
2024–25†	Oklahoma City	68	43	**27.6**	.474	.356	**.811**	**3.4**	2.5	1.8	**.5**	8.4
2025–26	Oklahoma City	77	**58**	26.6	.432	.351	.809	3.1	**2.6**	**1.9**	.4	**8.6**
Career		227	114	24.7	.463	.374	.803	2.9	2.2	1.5	.4	7.9

==== Playoffs ====
Year	Team	GP	GS	MPG	FG%	3P%	FT%	RPG	APG	SPG	BPG	PPG
2024	Oklahoma City	10	0	19.8	.390	.321	.500	1.3	1.0	.9	.2	4.2
2025†	Oklahoma City	**23***	**3**	22.4	.429	.323	.667	2.7	2.1	1.4	.4	5.6
2026	Oklahoma City	15	2	**24.9**	**.479**	**.484**	**.875**	**3.8**	**2.4**	**2.1**	**.5**	**8.6**
Career		48	5	22.7	.441	.388	.737	2.7	2.0	1.5	.4	6.2

=== College ===
Year	Team	GP	GS	MPG	FG%	3P%	FT%	RPG	APG	SPG	BPG	PPG
2022–23	Kentucky	32	32	32.2	.446	.346	.757	3.7	4.3	2.0	0.5	11.7

== Personal life ==
Wallace is cousin to 2012 NBA champion Terrel Harris and two-time Super Bowl champion, Super Bowl XXXII Most Valuable Player, and Pro Football Hall of Fame running back Terrell Davis. His older brother Keaton Wallace plays for the Atlanta Hawks. In June 2025, UCLA Bruins player Kiki Rice revealed that she is in a romantic relationship with Wallace and that they met in a Junior NBA program when Rice was in the 8th grade.
