= Cam Whitmore =

American basketball player (born 2004)

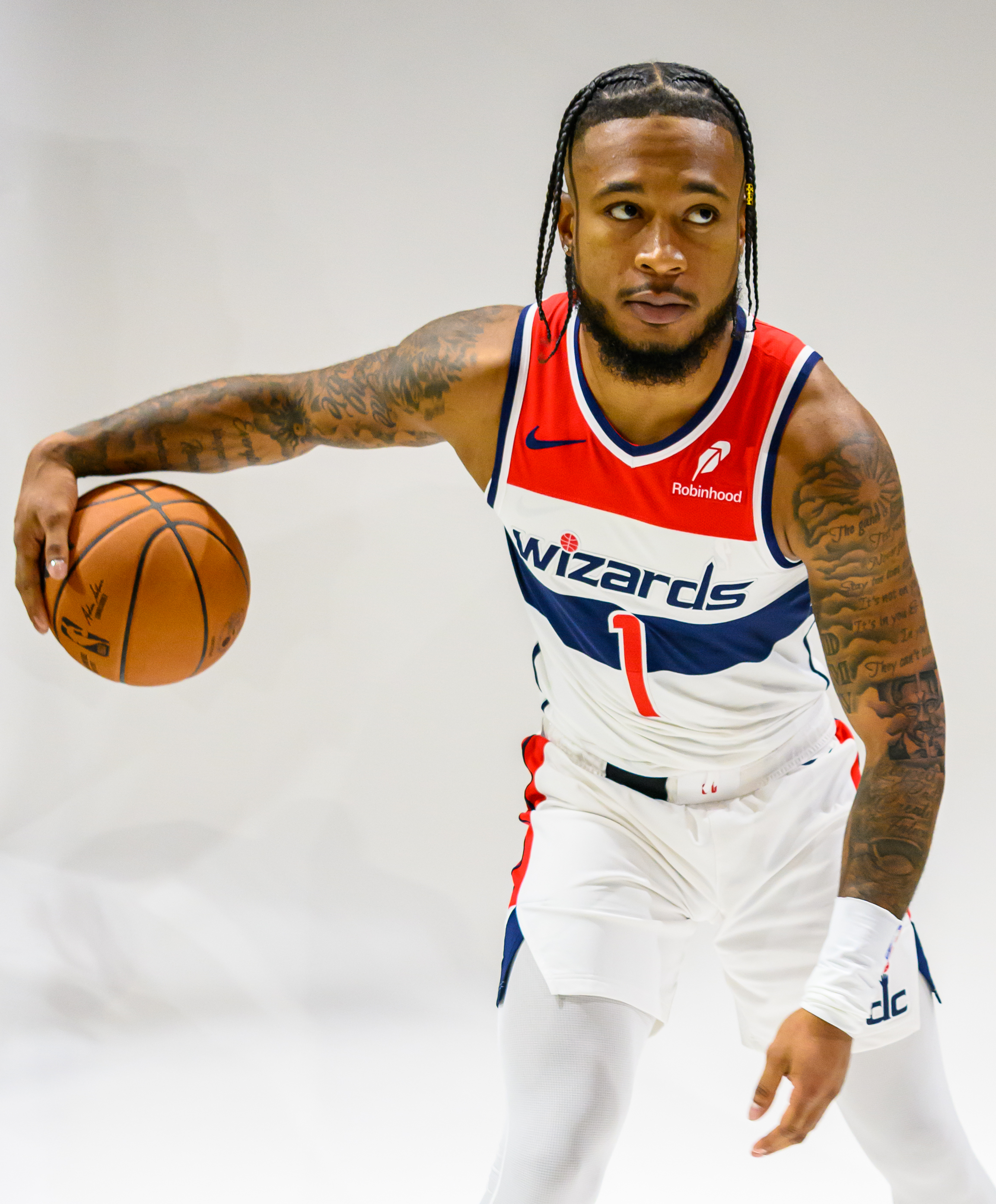
- Whitmore with the Washington Wizards in 2025

No. 00 – Denver Nuggets
- Position: Small forward
- League: NBA

Personal information
- Born: July 8, 2004 (age 22) Odenton, Maryland, U.S.
- Listed height: 6 ft 6 in (1.98 m)
- Listed weight: 230 lb (104 kg)

Career information
- High school: Archbishop Spalding (Severn, Maryland)
- College: Villanova (2022–2023)
- NBA draft: 2023: 1st round, 20th overall pick
- Drafted by: Houston Rockets
- Playing career: 2023–present

Career history
- 2023–2025: Houston Rockets
- 2023–2025: →Rio Grande Valley Vipers
- 2025–2026: Washington Wizards
- 2026–present: Denver Nuggets
- 2026–present: →Grand Rapids Gold

Career highlights
- Big East Freshman of the Year (2023); McDonald's All-American (2022); Nike Hoop Summit (2022); FIBA Under-18 Americas Championship MVP (2022)
- Stats at NBA.com
- Stats at Basketball Reference
Medals
Men's basketball
Representing the United States
FIBA Americas Under-18 Championship
Gold medal – first place	2022 Mexico	Team

Cameron Whitmore (born July 8, 2004) is an American professional basketball player for the Denver Nuggets of the National Basketball Association (NBA), on a two-way contract with the Grand Rapids Gold of the NBA G League. He played college basketball for the Villanova Wildcats and was selected by the Houston Rockets in the 2023 NBA draft. He was a consensus five-star recruit and one of the top players in the 2022 class.

== Early life and high school career ==
Whitmore attended Archbishop Spalding High School in Severn, Maryland. As a senior, he was the Capital Gazette boys' basketball player of the year. He was selected to play in the 2022 McDonald's All-American Boys Game. He played in the 2022 FIBA Under-18 Americas Championship, where he was named MVP.

=== Recruiting ===
Whitmore was a consensus five-star recruit and one of the top players in the 2022 class, according to major recruiting services. On October 7, 2021, he to playing college basketball for Villanova over offers from Illinois and North Carolina.

College recruiting
Name	Hometown	School	Height	Weight	Commit date
Cam Whitmore; SF	Odenton, MD	Archbishop Spalding (MD)	6 ft 7 in (2.01 m)	220 lb (100 kg)	Oct 7, 2021
Cam Whitmore; SF	Recruit ratings: Rivals: 247Sports: On3: ESPN: (90)				
Overall recruit ranking: Rivals: 10 247Sports: 11 On3: 7 ESPN: 22
Note: In many cases, Scout, Rivals, 247Sports, On3, and ESPN may conflict in their listings of height and weight.; In these cases, the average was taken. ESPN grades are on a 100-point scale.; Sources: "Villanova 2022 Basketball Commitments". Rivals.; "2022 Villanova Wildcats Recruiting Class". ESPN.; "2022 Team Ranking". Rivals.

== College career ==
After missing seven games with a thumb injury, Whitmore made his collegiate debut versus Oklahoma. In his first season with Villanova, Whitmore averaged 12.5 points, 5.3 rebounds and 0.7 assists per game. At the conclusion of his freshman year, Whitmore was named the Big East Conference Men's Basketball Freshman of the Year. He later declared for the 2023 NBA draft, becoming Villanova's first true one-and-done since Tim Thomas in 1997.

== Professional career ==
=== Houston Rockets (2023–2025) ===
Before the draft, Whitmore was widely regarded to be a lottery pick with some projections placing him as high as fourth overall. The Houston Rockets selected Whitmore with the 20th overall pick in the 2023 NBA draft. On October 26, 2023, he made his NBA debut in a 116–86 loss to the Orlando Magic and made his first NBA start on January 21, 2024, in a home loss to the Boston Celtics. On January 26, 2024, Whitmore recorded his first career double-double and his then-career high, recording 24 points, 11 rebounds and 2 assists on 50% shooting (44% from three) in a 138–104 win over the Charlotte Hornets. Whitmore led the NBA in points per touch and averaged 23.7 points per 36 minutes in his rookie season.

In his second season, Whitmore's playing time decreased with Tari Eason returning from injury. He had several assignments with Rio Grande Valley. On April 11, 2025, Whitmore scored a career-high 34 points in a 140–109 loss to the Los Angeles Lakers.

=== Washington Wizards (2025–2026) ===
On July 5, 2025, the Washington Wizards acquired Whitmore in a three-team trade also involving the New Orleans Pelicans that sent the draft rights to Mojave King and two future second-round draft picks. The trade also involved another former Villanova Wildcat, as Saddiq Bey was traded from the Wizards to the Pelicans.

On October 22, 2025, Whitmore made his Wizards debut. He scored 14 points and secured five rebounds in 19 minutes, coming off the bench for the Wizards. The Wizards lost 133–120 against the Milwaukee Bucks. He made 21 appearances for Washington during the 2025–26 NBA season, averaging 9.2 points, 2.8 rebounds and 0.7 assists. On December 23, Whitmore was diagnosed with upper-extremity deep vein thrombosis in his right shoulder. On January 15, 2026, Whitmore was ruled out for the remainder of the season as a result of the diagnosis.

On August 21, 2026, Whitmore was traded to the Cleveland Cavaliers in a five-team trade, but he was waived by the team on August 28.

=== Denver Nuggets / Grand Rapids Gold (2026–present) ===
On September 18, 2026, Whitmore signed a two-way contract with the Denver Nuggets.

== Player profile ==
Standing at 6 feet 6 inches and 235 pounds, Whitmore plays at the small forward position. At the 2023 NBA Combine, Whitmore finished third in max vertical leap (40.5 inches). Scouts viewed Whitmore as a versatile wing with tremendous upside and athleticism. Offensively, he can effectively use a range of dribble moves to score in transition against similarly sized defenders. Coming into the league, commentators noted his half-court scoring, vision and IQ as weaknesses. He has been compared to Jae Crowder and Caron Butler.

== Career statistics ==
Legend
GP	Games played	GS	Games started	MPG	Minutes per game
FG%	Field goal percentage	3P%	3-point field goal percentage	FT%	Free throw percentage
RPG	Rebounds per game	APG	Assists per game	SPG	Steals per game
BPG	Blocks per game	PPG	Points per game	**Bold**	Career high

=== NBA ===
Year	Team	GP	GS	MPG	FG%	3P%	FT%	RPG	APG	SPG	BPG	PPG
2023–24	Houston	47	2	**18.7**	.454	**.359**	.679	**3.8**	.7	.6	**.4**	**12.3**
2024–25	Houston	**51**	**3**	16.2	.444	.355	**.750**	3.0	**1.0**	.6	.3	9.4
2025–26	Washington	21	0	16.9	**.456**	.286	.742	2.8	.7	**.7**	**.4**	9.2
Career		119	5	17.3	.450	.349	.712	3.3	.8	.6	.3	10.5

=== College ===
Year	Team	GP	GS	MPG	FG%	3P%	FT%	RPG	APG	SPG	BPG	PPG
2022–23	Villanova	26	20	27.4	.478	.343	.703	5.3	.7	1.4	.3	12.5
