= 2023 NBA draft =

77th edition of the NBA draft

General information
- Sport: Basketball
- Date: June 22, 2023
- Location: Barclays Center (Brooklyn, New York)
- Networks: ESPN; ABC (first round only)

Overview
- 58 total selections in 2 rounds
- League: NBA
- First selection: Victor Wembanyama (San Antonio Spurs)

The 2023 NBA draft, the 77th edition of the National Basketball Association's annual draft, was held on June 22, 2023, at Barclays Center in Brooklyn, New York. The draft consisted of 58 picks instead of the typical 60 for the second year in a row due to the loss of a second-round pick for both the Chicago Bulls and the Philadelphia 76ers for violating the NBA's tampering rules during free agency. The first overall selection was made by the San Antonio Spurs, who selected the 7'4" French center Victor Wembanyama. Wembanyama went on to win the Rookie of the Year.

== Draft selections ==
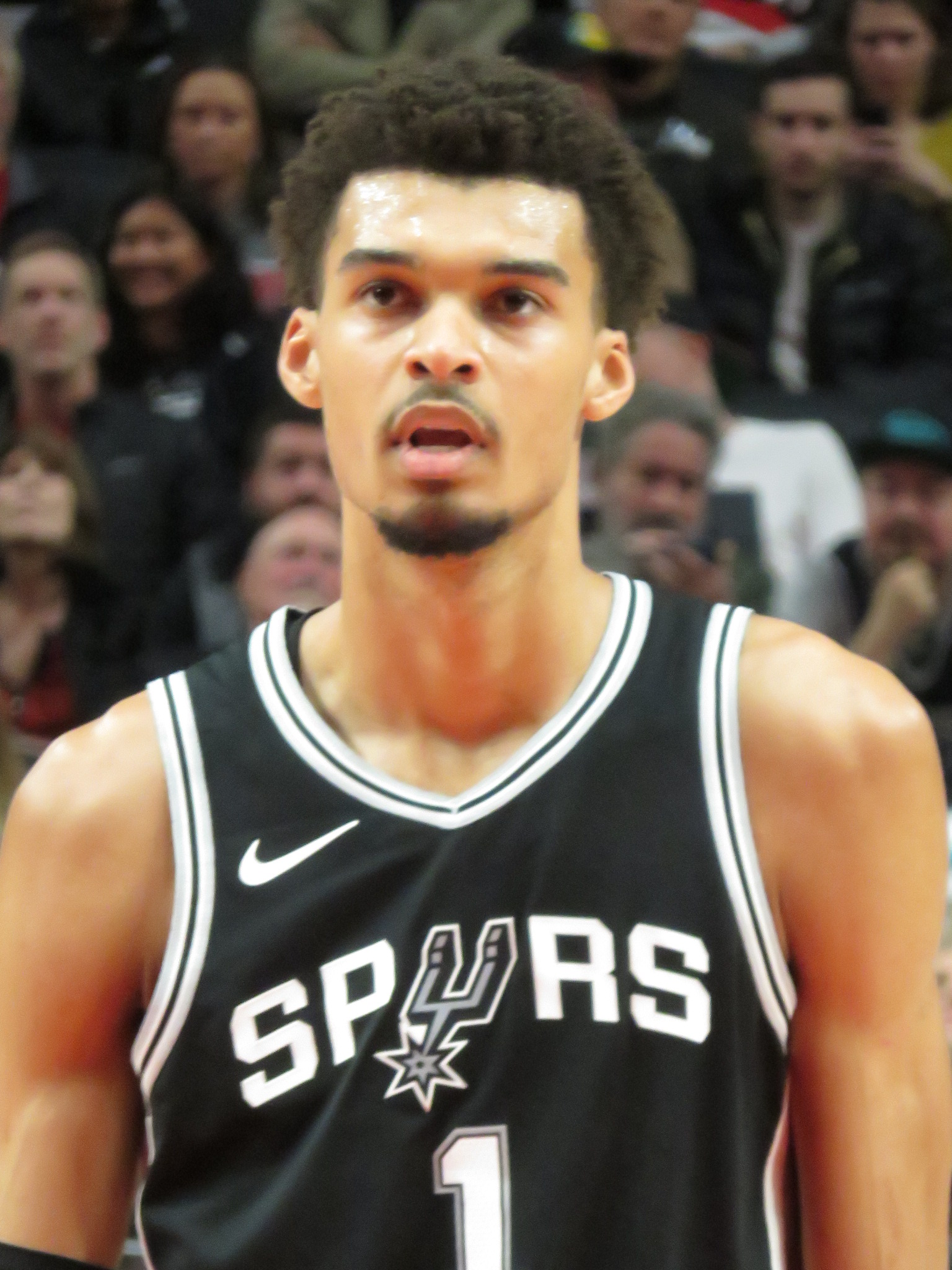
Victor Wembanyama was selected 1st overall by the San Antonio Spurs.

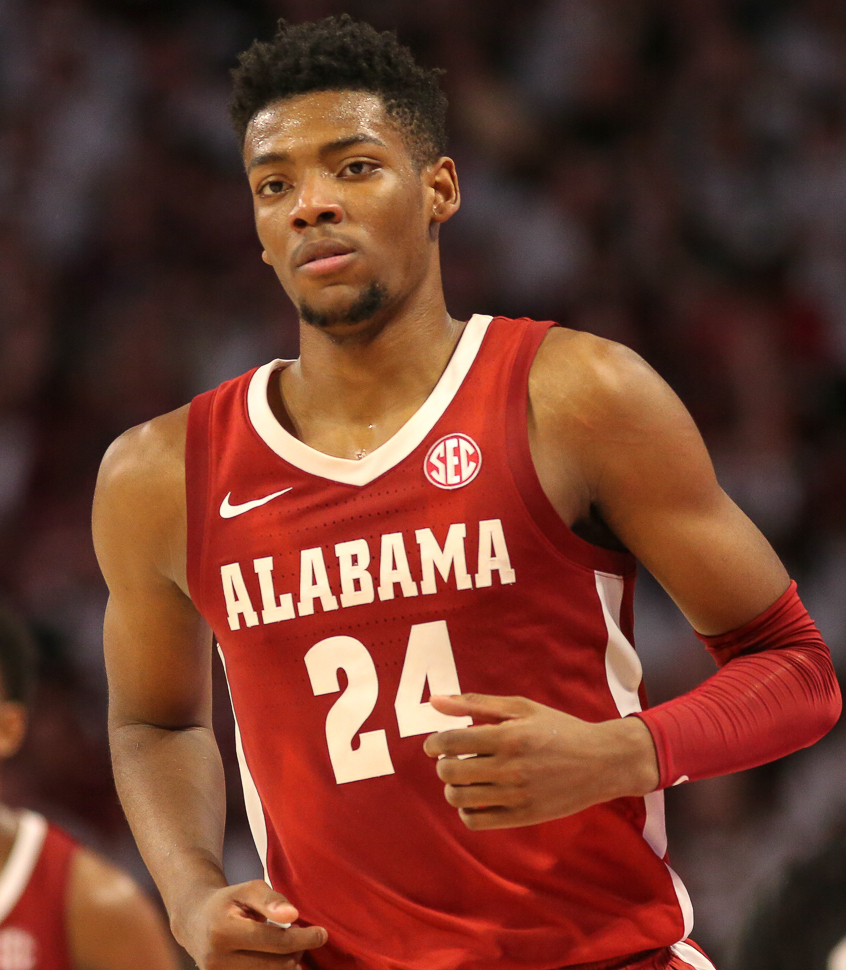
Brandon Miller was selected 2nd overall by the Charlotte Hornets.

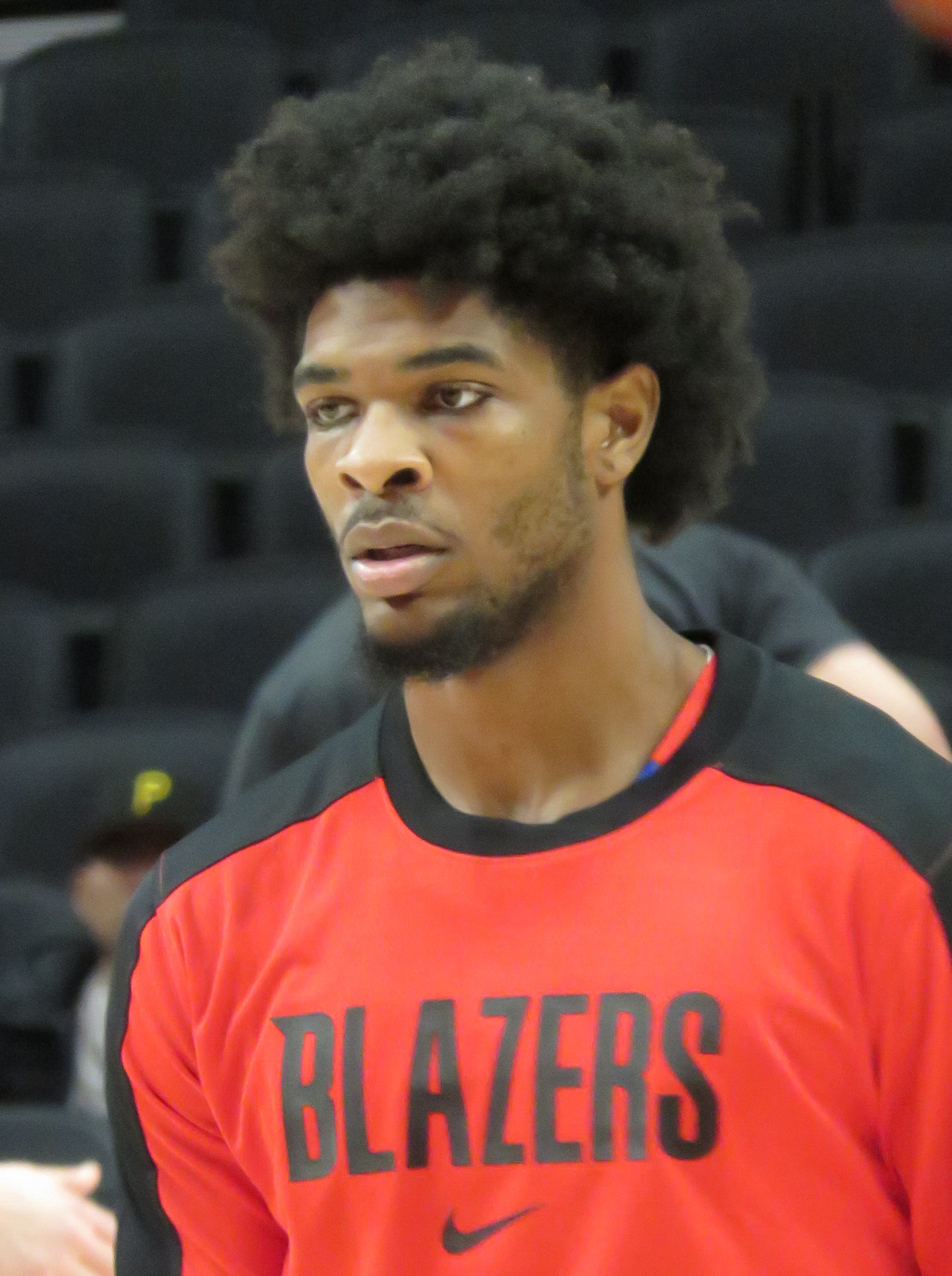
Scoot Henderson was selected 3rd overall by the Portland Trail Blazers.

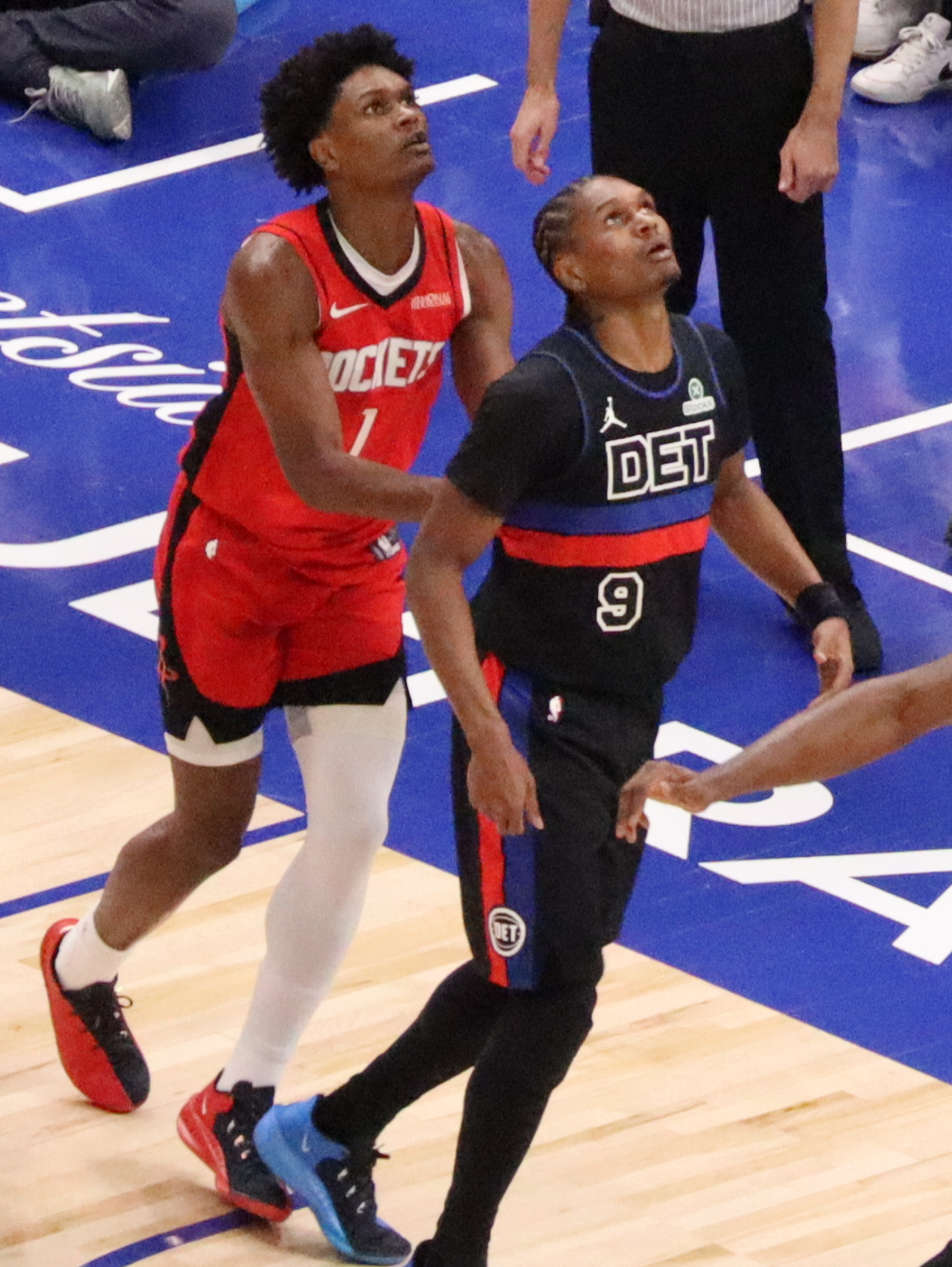
Amen and Ausar Thompson were selected 4th and 5th overall by the Houston Rockets and Detroit Pistons respectively.

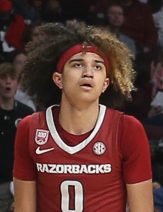
Anthony Black was selected 6th overall by the Orlando Magic.

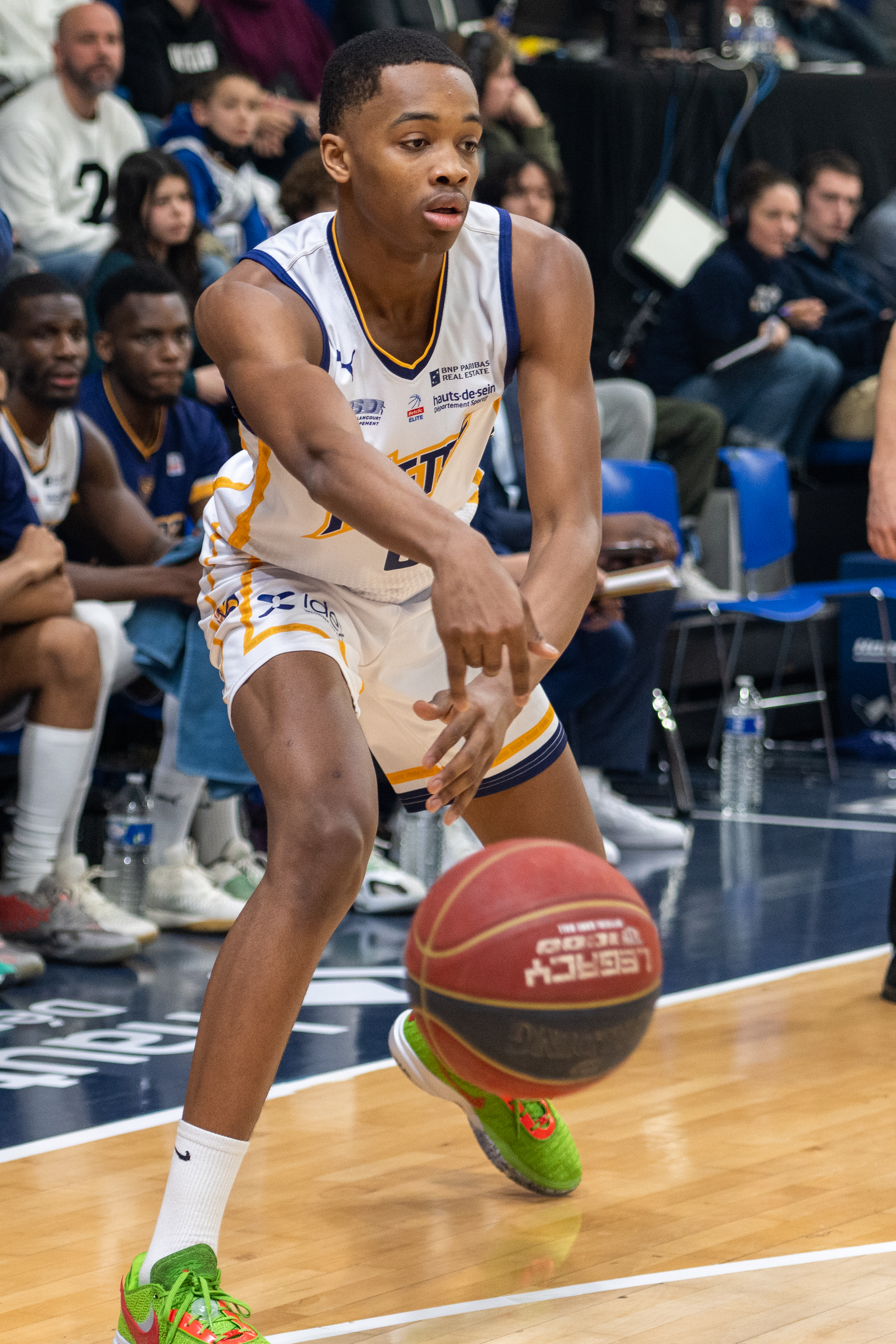
Bilal Coulibaly was selected 7th overall by the Indiana Pacers (traded to the Washington Wizards).

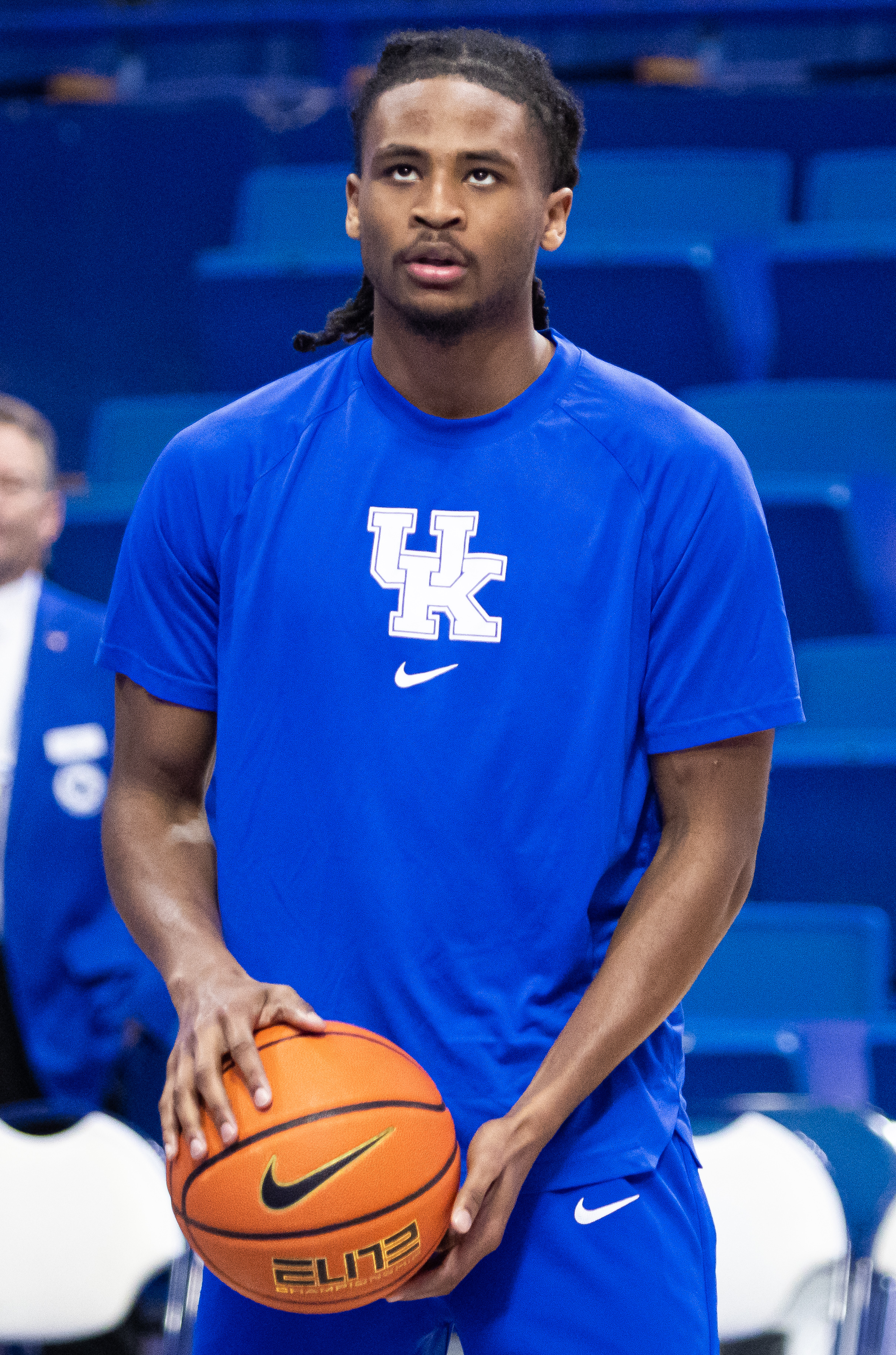
Cason Wallace was selected 10th overall by the Dallas Mavericks (traded to the Oklahoma City Thunder).

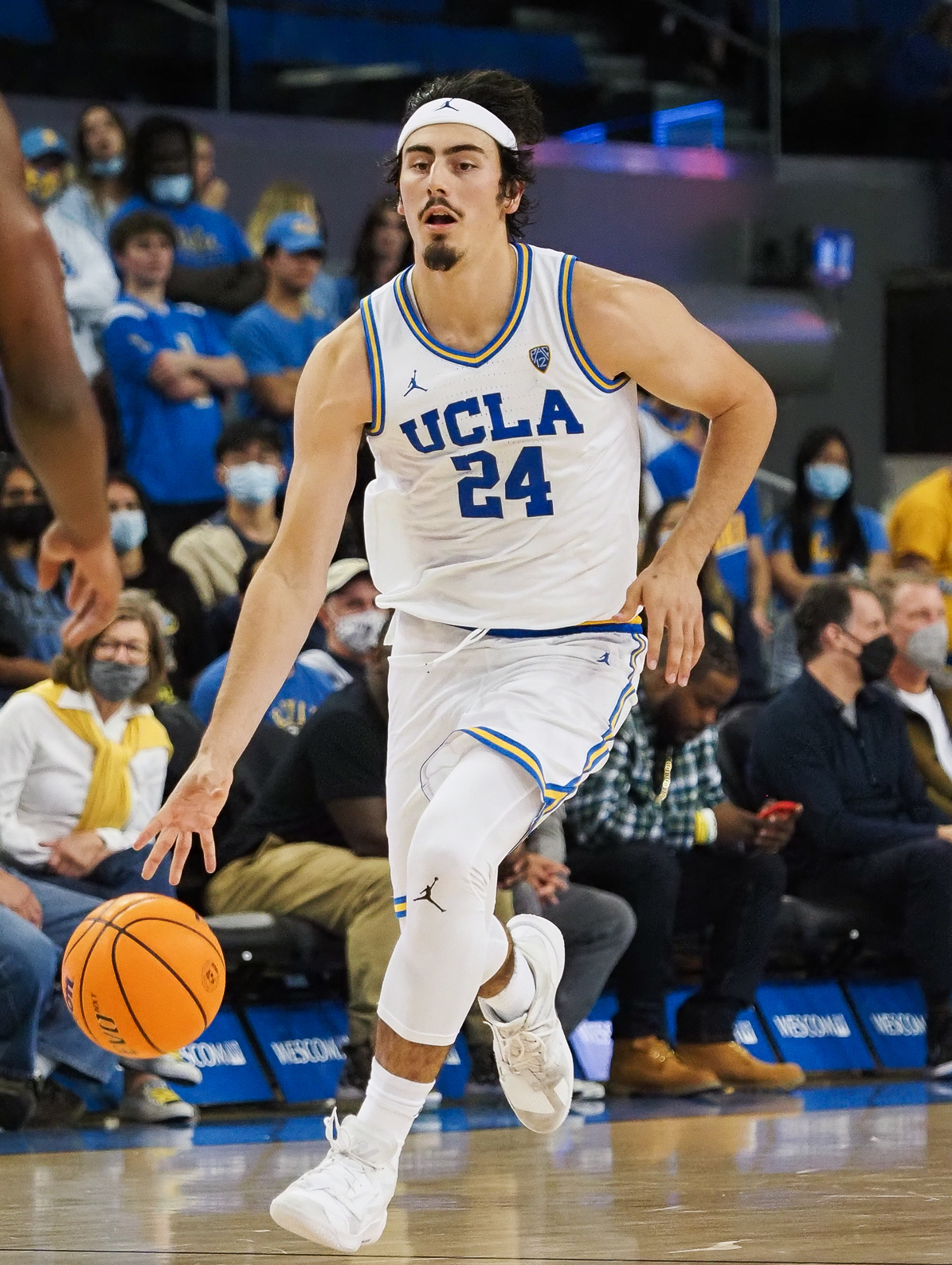
Jaime Jaquez Jr. was selected 18th overall by the Miami Heat.

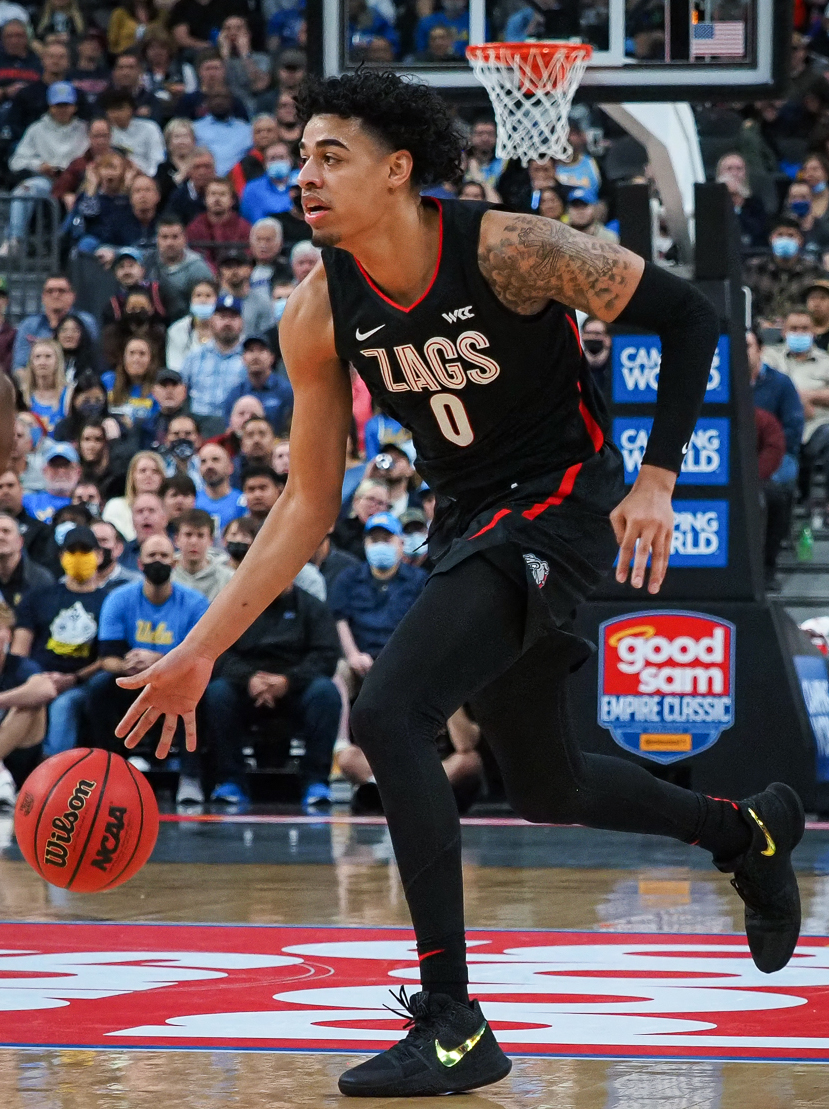
Julian Strawther was selected 29th overall by the Indiana Pacers (traded to the Denver Nuggets).

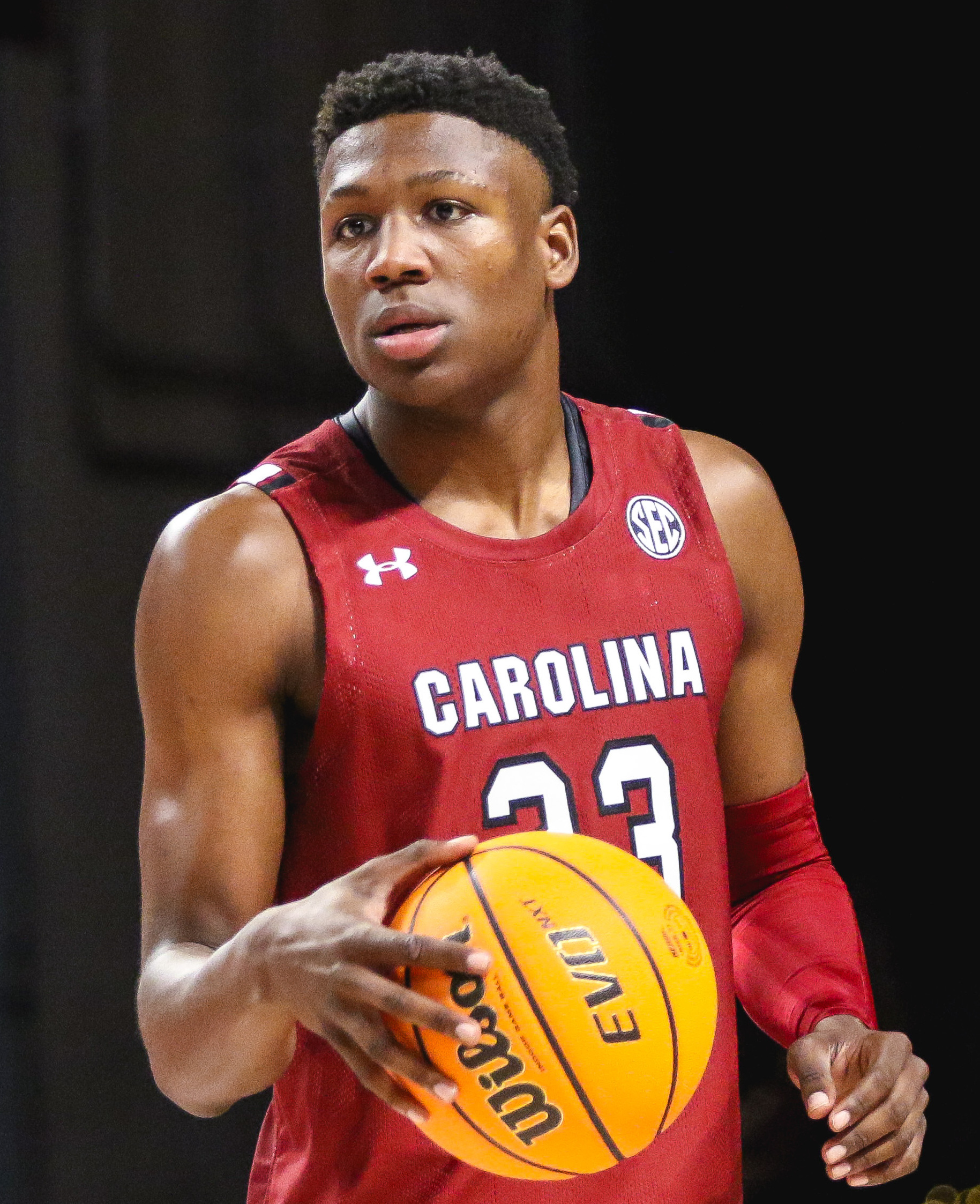
GG Jackson was selected 45th overall by the Memphis Grizzlies.

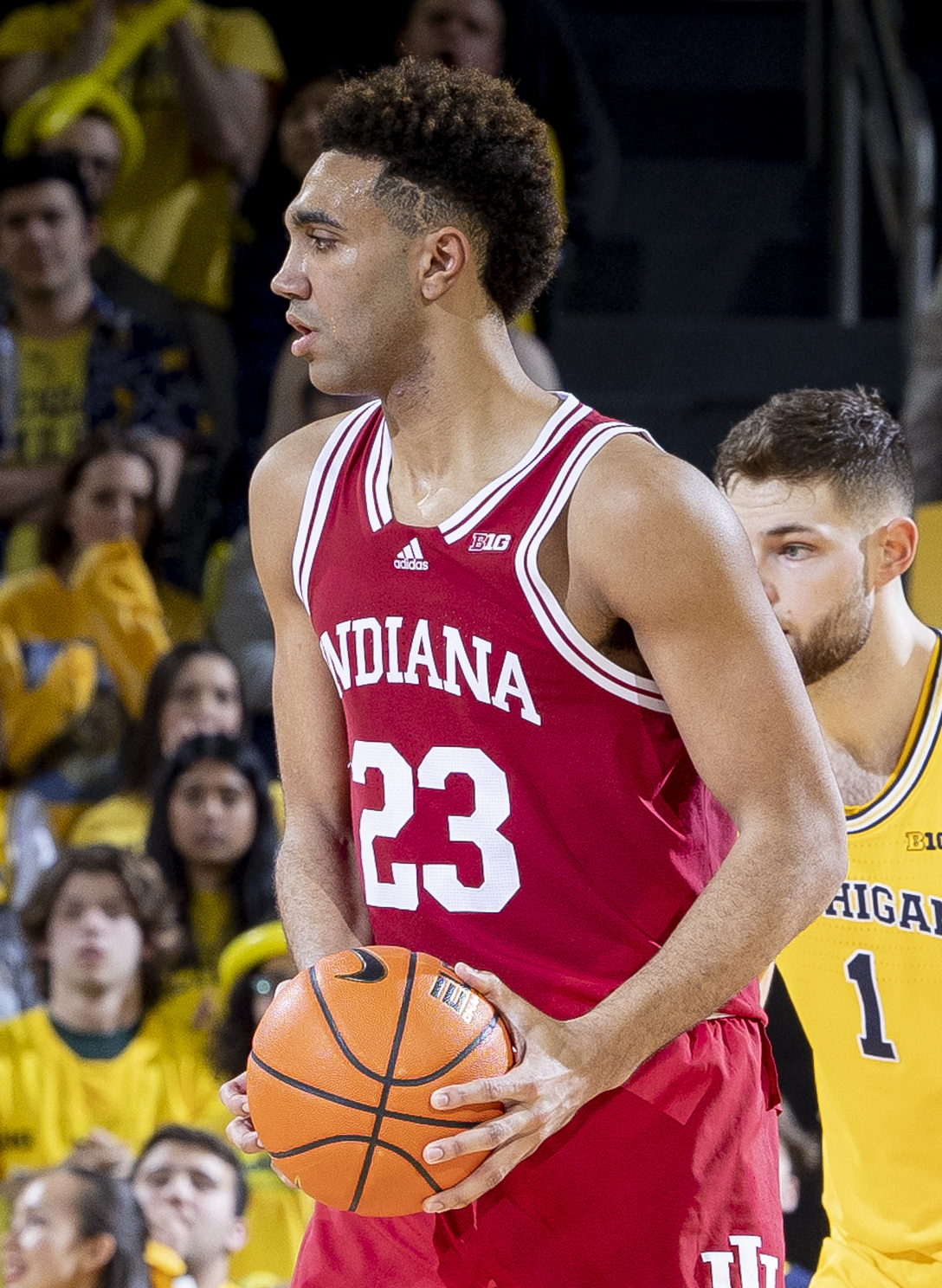
Trayce Jackson-Davis was selected 57th overall by the Washington Wizards (traded to the Golden State Warriors).

| PG | Point guard | SG | Shooting guard | SF | Small forward | PF | Power forward | C | Center |

| * | Denotes player who has been selected for at least one All-Star Game and All-NBA Team |
| ^{+} | Denotes player who has been selected for at least one All-Star Game |
| ^{#} | Denotes player who has never appeared in an NBA regular-season or playoff game |
| ^{~} | Denotes player who has been selected as Rookie of the Year |

| Rnd. | Pick | Player | Pos. | Nationality (Note: Nationality indicates the player's national team or representative nationality. If a player has not competed at the international level, then the nationality indicates the national team which the player is eligible to represent according to FIBA rules.) | Team | School / club team |
|---|---|---|---|---|---|---|
| 1 | 1 | Victor Wembanyama*^{~} | C | France | San Antonio Spurs | Metropolitans 92 (France) |
| 1 | 2 | Brandon Miller | SF | United States | Charlotte Hornets | Alabama (Fr.) |
| 1 | 3 | Scoot Henderson | PG | United States | Portland Trail Blazers | NBA G League Ignite (NBA G League) |
| 1 | 4 | Amen Thompson | PG/SF | United States | Houston Rockets | City Reapers (Overtime Elite) |
| 1 | 5 | Ausar Thompson | SF/SG | United States | Detroit Pistons | City Reapers (Overtime Elite) |
| 1 | 6 | Anthony Black | PG/SG | United States | Orlando Magic | Arkansas (Fr.) |
| 1 | 7 | Bilal Coulibaly | SF | France | Indiana Pacers (traded to Washington) (Note: June 23, 2023: Washington Wizards to Indiana Pacers (three-team trade with Phoenix Suns): Washington acquired the draft rights to Bilal Coulibaly, Chris Paul, Landry Shamet, six future second-round picks, four future pick swaps, and cash considerations; Indiana acquired the draft rights to Jarace Walker and two future second-round picks; Phoenix acquired Bradley Beal, Jordan Goodwin, and Isaiah Todd) | Metropolitans 92 (France) |
| 1 | 8 | Jarace Walker | PF | United States | Washington Wizards (traded to Indiana) | Houston (Fr.) |
| 1 | 9 | Taylor Hendricks | PF | United States | Utah Jazz | UCF (Fr.) |
| 1 | 10 | Cason Wallace | PG | United States | Dallas Mavericks (traded to Oklahoma City) (Note: July 6, 2023: Dallas Mavericks to Oklahoma City Thunder: Oklahoma City acquired the draft rights to Cason Wallace and Dāvis Bertāns; Dallas acquired the draft rights to Dereck Lively II) | Kentucky (Fr.) |
| 1 | 11 | Jett Howard | SF | United States | Orlando Magic (from Chicago) (Note: March 25, 2021: Chicago Bulls to Orlando Magic: Orlando acquired Wendell Carter Jr., Otto Porter Jr., and 2021 and 2023 first-round picks; Chicago acquired Nikola Vučević and Al-Farouq Aminu) | Michigan (Fr.) |
| 1 | 12 | Dereck Lively II | C | United States | Oklahoma City Thunder (traded to Dallas) | Duke (Fr.) |
| 1 | 13 | Gradey Dick | SG/SF | United States | Toronto Raptors | Kansas (Fr.) |
| 1 | 14 | Jordan Hawkins | SG | United States | New Orleans Pelicans | UConn (So.) |
| 1 | 15 | Kobe Bufkin | SG | United States | Atlanta Hawks | Michigan (So.) |
| 1 | 16 | Keyonte George | SG | United States | Utah Jazz (from Minnesota) (Note: July 6, 2022: Minnesota Timberwolves to Utah Jazz: Utah acquired Walker Kessler, 2023, 2025, 2027, and 2029 first-round picks, and 2026 right to swap first-round picks; Minnesota acquired Rudy Gobert) | Baylor (Fr.) |
| 1 | 17 | Jalen Hood-Schifino | PG/SG | United States | Los Angeles Lakers | Indiana (Fr.) |
| 1 | 18 | Jaime Jaquez Jr. | SF/SG | Mexico (Note: Jaquez was born in the United States and is of Mexican descent. He holds dual citizenship but has played for the Mexican national team.) | Miami Heat | UCLA (Sr.) |
| 1 | 19 | Brandin Podziemski | SG | United States | Golden State Warriors | Santa Clara (So.) |
| 1 | 20 | Cam Whitmore | SF | United States | Houston Rockets (from L.A. Clippers) (Note: March 19, 2021: Milwaukee Bucks to Houston Rockets: Houston acquired D. J. Augustin, D. J. Wilson, the right to swap their 2021 second-round pick for Milwaukee's 2021 first-round pick (top 9 protected), and Milwaukee's 2023 first-round pick; Milwaukee acquired P. J. Tucker, Rodions Kurucs, and Milwaukee's 2022 first-round pick which Houston had obtained in a previous trade; February 9, 2023: Houston Rockets to Los Angeles Clippers (three-team trade with Memphis Grizzlies): L.A. acquired Eric Gordon and three second-round picks; Houston acquired John Wall, Danny Green, and the right to swap Milwaukee's 2023 first-round pick with L.A.'s 2023 first-round pick; Memphis acquired Luke Kennard) | Villanova (Fr.) |
| 1 | 21 | Noah Clowney | PF | United States | Brooklyn Nets (from Phoenix) (Note: February 9, 2023: Phoenix Suns to Brooklyn Nets (four-team trade with Milwaukee Bucks and Indiana Pacers): Brooklyn acquired Mikal Bridges, Cameron Johnson, the draft rights to Juan Pablo Vaulet, Phoenix's first-round picks in 2023, 2025, 2027, and 2029, the right to swap first-round picks with Phoenix in 2028, and two future second-round picks from Milwaukee; Phoenix acquired Kevin Durant and T. J. Warren; Milwaukee acquired Jae Crowder; Indiana acquired George Hill, Serge Ibaka, Jordan Nwora, three future second-round picks from Milwaukee, and cash considerations from Brooklyn) | Alabama (Fr.) |
| 1 | 22 | Dariq Whitehead | SF | United States | Brooklyn Nets | Duke (Fr.) |
| 1 | 23 | Kris Murray | PF | United States | Portland Trail Blazers (from New York) (Note: February 8, 2023: New York Knicks to Portland Trail Blazers (four-team trade with Philadelphia 76ers and Charlotte Hornets): Portland acquired Cam Reddish, Ryan Arcidiacono, Matisse Thybulle, and New York's lottery-protected 2023 first-round pick; New York acquired Josh Hart; Philadelphia acquired Jalen McDaniels, New York's 2024 second-round pick, and Portland's 2029 second-round pick; Charlotte acquired Svi Mykhailiuk, the most favorable of Atlanta's, Charlotte's, and Brooklyn's 2023 second-round picks, and Portland's 2027 second-round pick) | Iowa (Jr.) |
| 1 | 24 | Olivier-Maxence Prosper | SF/PF | Canada | Sacramento Kings (traded to Dallas) (Note: July 6, 2023: Sacramento Kings to Dallas Mavericks: Dallas acquired Richaun Holmes, and the draft rights to Olivier-Maxence Prosper; Sacramento acquired cash considerations) | Marquette (Jr.) |
| 1 | 25 | Marcus Sasser | SG/PG | United States | Memphis Grizzlies (traded to Detroit via Boston) (Note: June 22, 2023: Memphis Grizzlies to Boston Celtics (three-team trade with Washington Wizards): Boston acquired Kristaps Porziņģis, Memphis's 2023 first-round pick, and a 2024 protected first-round pick; Memphis acquired Marcus Smart; Washington acquired Tyus Jones, Mike Muscala, Danilo Gallinari, and Portland's 2023 second-round pick) (Note: June 28, 2023: Boston Celtics to Detroit Pistons: Detroit acquired the draft rights to Marcus Sasser; Boston acquired the draft rights to James Nnaji and two future second-round picks) | Houston (Sr.) |
| 1 | 26 | Ben Sheppard | SG | United States | Indiana Pacers (from Cleveland) (Note: February 7, 2022: Cleveland Cavaliers to Indiana Pacers: Indiana acquired Ricky Rubio, a lottery-protected 2022 first-round pick (which did not convey in 2022 and instead became a lottery-protected 2023 first-round pick), Houston's 2022 second-round pick, and Utah's 2027 second-round pick; Cleveland acquired Caris LeVert and Miami's 2022 second-round pick) | Belmont (Sr.) |
| 1 | 27 | Nick Smith Jr. | PG/SG | United States | Charlotte Hornets (from Denver via New York and Oklahoma City) (Note: November 23, 2020: Denver Nuggets to Oklahoma City Thunder (four-team trade with Milwaukee Bucks and New Orleans Pelicans): Oklahoma City acquired George Hill, Zylan Cheatham, Josh Gray, Darius Miller, Kenrich Williams, a future first-round pick from Denver, Washington's 2023 second-round pick, and Charlotte's 2024 second-round pick; Denver acquired R. J. Hampton; Milwaukee acquired Jrue Holiday and Sam Merrill; New Orleans acquired Steven Adams, Eric Bledsoe, two future first-round picks from Milwaukee, and the right to swap two additional first-round picks with Milwaukee) (Note: June 23, 2022: Oklahoma City Thunder to New York Knicks: New York acquired protected 2023 first-round picks originally from Denver, Detroit, and Washington; Oklahoma City acquired Ousmane Dieng) (Note: June 23, 2022: New York Knicks to Charlotte Hornets (three-team trade with Detroit Pistons): Charlotte acquired a 2023 first-round pick originally from Denver and four future second-round picks; New York acquired a 2025 first-round pick originally from Milwaukee; Detroit acquired Kemba Walker and Jalen Duren) | Arkansas (Fr.) |
| 1 | 28 | Brice Sensabaugh | SF | United States | Utah Jazz (from Philadelphia via Brooklyn) (Note: February 10, 2022: Philadelphia 76ers to Brooklyn Nets: Brooklyn acquired Ben Simmons, Seth Curry, Andre Drummond, a 2022 first-round pick with the right to defer to 2023 (which was exercised), and a protected 2027 first-round pick; Philadelphia acquired James Harden and Paul Millsap; June 30, 2022: Brooklyn Nets to Utah Jazz: Utah acquired a 2023 first-round draft pick (the least favorable of Brooklyn's, Houston's, and Philadelphia's); Brooklyn acquired Royce O'Neale) | Ohio State (Fr.) |
| 1 | 29 | Julian Strawther | SF | Puerto Rico (Note: Strawther was born in the United States and is of Puerto Rican descent. He holds dual citizenship but has played for the Puerto Rican national team.) | Indiana Pacers (from Boston, (Note: July 9, 2022: Boston Celtics to Indiana Pacers: Indiana acquired Aaron Nesmith, Daniel Theis, Nik Stauskas, Malik Fitts, Juwan Morgan, and a 2023 first-round pick; Boston acquired Malcolm Brogdon) traded to Denver) (Note: June 23, 2023: Indiana Pacers to Denver Nuggets (four-team trade with L.A. Lakers and Oklahoma City): L.A. Lakers acquired the draft rights to Maxwell Lewis; Denver acquired the draft rights to Julian Strawther, the draft rights to Jalen Pickett, the draft rights to Hunter Tyson, and a 2024 second-round pick; Indiana acquired the draft rights to Mojave King, a 2024 first-round pick (from Oklahoma City via Denver), and cash consideration; Oklahoma City acquired a 2029 first-round pick) | Gonzaga (Jr.) |
| 1 | 30 | Kobe Brown | SG/SF | United States | Los Angeles Clippers (from Milwaukee via Houston) | Missouri (Sr.) |
| 2 | 31 | James Nnaji^{#} | C | Nigeria | Detroit Pistons (traded to Charlotte via Boston) (Note: June 28, 2023: Boston Celtics to Charlotte Hornets: Boston acquired the draft rights to Colby Jones and the draft rights to Mouhamed Gueye; Charlotte acquired the draft rights to James Nnaji) | FC Barcelona (Spain) |
| 2 | 32 | Jalen Pickett | SG | United States | Indiana Pacers (from Houston, (Note: January 13, 2021: Houston Rockets to Indiana Pacers (four-team trade with Brooklyn Nets and Cleveland Cavaliers): Indiana acquired Caris LeVert and Houston's 2023 second-round pick; Houston acquired Milwaukee's 2022 first-round pick, Brooklyn's first-found picks in 2022, 2024, and 2026, and the rights to swap first-round picks with Brooklyn in 2021, 2023, 2025, and 2027; Brooklyn acquired James Harden and Cleveland's 2024 second-round pick; Cleveland acquired Jarrett Allen and Taurean Prince) traded to Denver) | Penn State (Sr.) |
| 2 | 33 | Leonard Miller | SF | Canada | San Antonio Spurs (traded to Minnesota) (Note: June 23, 2023: San Antonio Spurs to Minnesota Timberwolves: Minnesota acquired the draft rights to Leonard Miller; San Antonio acquired 2026 and 2028 second-round picks) | NBA G League Ignite (NBA G League) |
| 2 | 34 | Colby Jones | SG | United States | Charlotte Hornets (from Charlotte via Philadelphia and Atlanta, (Note: June 21, 2018: Charlotte Hornets to Atlanta Hawks: Atlanta acquired 2019 and 2023 second-round picks; Charlotte acquired Devonte' Graham; July 7, 2019: Atlanta Hawks to Philadelphia 76ers: Philadelphia acquired Jordan Bone, a protected 2020 second-round pick, and the most favorable of Atlanta's, Charlotte's, and Brooklyn's 2023 second-round picks; Atlanta acquired Bruno Fernando) traded to Sacramento via Boston) (Note: June 28, 2023: Boston Celtics to Sacramento Kings: Sacramento acquired the draft rights to Colby Jones; Boston acquired the draft rights to Jordan Walsh and a 2024 second-round pick) | Xavier (Jr.) |
| 2 | 35 | Julian Phillips | SF | United States | Boston Celtics (from Portland via Atlanta, L.A. Clippers, Detroit, and Cleveland, (Note: February 4, 2019: Portland Trail Blazers to Cleveland Cavaliers: Cleveland acquired Nik Stauskas, Wade Baldwin IV, and second-round picks in 2021 and 2023; Portland acquired Rodney Hood; June 27, 2019: Cleveland Cavaliers to Detroit Pistons: Detroit acquired Portland's 2023 second-round pick, three other future second-round picks, and cash; Cleveland acquired Kevin Porter Jr.; November 19, 2020: Detroit Pistons to L.A. Clippers (three-team trade with Brooklyn Nets): L.A. Clippers acquired Jay Scrubb, Luke Kennard, Justin Patton, Portland's 2023 second-round pick, and three other future second-round picks; Detroit acquired Saddiq Bey, Dzanan Musa, Jaylen Hands, Rodney McGruder, a second-round pick, and cash; Brooklyn acquired Landry Shamet, Reggie Perry, and Bruce Brown; March 25, 2021: L.A. Clippers to Atlanta Hawks: Atlanta acquired Lou Williams, Portland's 2023 second-round pick, and a 2027 second-round pick; L.A. Clippers acquired Rajon Rondo; August 7, 2021: Atlanta Hawks to Boston Celtics (three-team trade with Sacramento Kings): Boston acquired Kris Dunn, Bruno Fernando, and Portland's 2023 second-round pick; Atlanta acquired Delon Wright; Sacramento acquired Tristan Thompson) traded to Chicago via Washington) (Note: June 28, 2023: Washington Wizards to Chicago Bulls: Chicago acquired the draft rights to Julian Phillips; Washington acquired Chicago's 2026 and 2027 second round draft picks) | Tennessee (Fr.) |
| 2 | 36 | Andre Jackson Jr. | SG | United States | Orlando Magic (traded to Milwaukee) (Note: June 23, 2023: Orlando Magic to Milwaukee Bucks: Milwaukee acquired the draft rights to Andre Jackson Jr.; Orlando acquired Milwaukee's 2030 second-round pick and cash considerations) | UConn (Jr.) |
| 2 | 37 | Hunter Tyson | SF | United States | Oklahoma City Thunder (from Washington via New Orleans, (Note: February 6, 2019: Washington Wizards to New Orleans Pelicans: New Orleans acquired Markieff Morris and a 2023 second-round pick; Washington acquired Wesley Johnson) traded to Denver) | Clemson (Sr.) |
| 2 | 38 | Jordan Walsh | SF | United States | Sacramento Kings (from Indiana, (Note: February 8, 2022: Indiana Pacers to Sacramento Kings: Sacramento acquired Justin Holiday, Jeremy Lamb, Domantas Sabonis, and a 2023 second-round pick; Indiana acquired Tyrese Haliburton, Buddy Hield, and Tristan Thompson) traded to Boston) | Arkansas (Fr.) |
| 2 | 39 | Mouhamed Gueye | PF | Senegal | Charlotte Hornets (from Utah via New York, (Note: November 19, 2020: Utah Jazz to New York Knicks: New York acquired Ed Davis and two 2023 second-round picks; Utah acquired cash considerations) traded to Atlanta via Boston) (Note: June 28, 2023: Boston Celtics to Atlanta Hawks: Atlanta acquired the draft rights to Mouhamed Gueye; Boston acquired a 2027 second-round pick) | Washington State (So.) |
| 2 | 40 | Maxwell Lewis | SF | United States | Denver Nuggets (from Dallas via Oklahoma City, (Note: November 20, 2020: Dallas Mavericks to Oklahoma City Thunder (three-team trade with Detroit Pistons): Oklahoma City acquired Justin Jackson, Trevor Ariza, the most favorable of Dallas's and Miami's 2023 second-round picks, and Dallas's 2026 second-round pick; Dallas acquired James Johnson; Detroit acquired Delon Wright; June 23, 2022: Oklahoma City Thunder to Denver Nuggets: Denver acquired the draft rights to Peyton Watson and two future second-round picks; Oklahoma City acquired JaMychal Green and a 2027 protected first-round draft pick) traded to L.A. Lakers) | Pepperdine (So.) |
| 2 | 41 | Amari Bailey | SG | United States | Charlotte Hornets (from Oklahoma City via New York and Boston) (Note: June 18, 2021: Oklahoma City Thunder to Boston Celtics: Boston acquired Al Horford, Moses Brown, and a 2023 second-round pick; Oklahoma City acquired Kemba Walker, a 2021 first-round pick, and a 2025 second-round pick; August 17, 2021: Boston Celtics to New York Knicks: New York acquired Evan Fournier and two future second-round picks; Boston acquired cash considerations) | UCLA (Fr.) |
| 2 | 42 | Tristan Vukčević | PF/C | Serbia | Washington Wizards (from Chicago via Los Angeles Lakers and Washington) (Note: February 6, 2019: Chicago Bulls to Washington Wizards: Washington acquired Bobby Portis, Jabari Parker, and a protected 2023 second-round pick; Chicago acquired Otto Porter Jr.; July 1, 2019: Chicago Bulls to Washington Wizards: Washington acquired removal of protections on Chicago's 2023 second-round pick and additional future draft compensation; Chicago acquired Tomas Satoransky; August 6, 2021: Washington Wizards to Los Angeles Lakers (five-team trade with Indiana, San Antonio, and Brooklyn): L.A. Lakers acquired Russell Westbrook and 2023, 2024, and 2028 second-round picks; Washington acquired Spencer Dinwiddie, Aaron Holiday, Kentavious Caldwell-Pope, Kyle Kuzma, Montrezl Harrell, the draft rights to forward Isaiah Todd, and cash considerations from Indiana; San Antonio acquired a 2022 second-round draft pick and Chandler Hutchison; Indiana acquired the draft rights to Isaiah Jackson; Brooklyn acquired the draft rights to Nikola Milutinov, a 2024 second-round pick, and the option to swap a 2025 second-round pick with Washington; January 23, 2023: Los Angeles Lakers to Washington Wizards: Washington acquired Kendrick Nunn and three future second-round picks; L.A. Lakers acquired Rui Hachimura) | Partizan Belgrade (Serbia) |
| 2 | 43 | Rayan Rupert | SG | France | Portland Trail Blazers (from Atlanta) (Note: February 9, 2023: Atlanta Hawks to Portland Trail Blazers (four-team trade with Golden State Warriors and Detroit Pistons): Portland acquired Kevin Knox, the most favorable of Atlanta's and Brooklyn's 2023 second-round picks, and 4 other future second-round picks; Atlanta acquired Saddiq Bey; Detroit acquired James Wiseman; Golden State acquired Gary Payton II and two future second-round picks) | New Zealand Breakers (New Zealand) |
| 2 | 44 | Sidy Cissoko | SG/SF | France | San Antonio Spurs (from Toronto) (Note: February 9, 2023: Toronto Raptors to San Antonio Spurs: San Antonio acquired Khem Birch, 2024 first-round pick, 2023 and 2025 second-round picks; Toronto acquired Jakob Pöltl) | NBA G League Ignite (NBA G League) |
| 2 | 45 | GG Jackson | PF | United States | Memphis Grizzlies (from Minnesota) (Note: June 24, 2022: Minnesota Timberwolves to Memphis Grizzlies: Memphis acquired draft rights to Jake LaRavia and a 2023 second-round pick; Minnesota acquired Draft rights to Walker Kessler and TyTy Washington Jr.) | South Carolina (Fr.) |
| 2 | 46 | Seth Lundy | SG | United States | Atlanta Hawks (from New Orleans) (Note: July 6, 2019: Atlanta Hawks to New Orleans Pelicans: New Orleans Pelicans acquired the draft rights to Jaxson Hayes, Nickeil Alexander-Walker and Marcos Louzada Silva, 2021 and 2022 second-round picks; Atlanta acquired Solomon Hill, the draft rights to De'Andre Hunter and Jordan Bone, and a 2023 second-round pick) | Penn State (Sr.) |
| 2 | 47 | Mojave King^{#} | SG | New Zealand / United States | Los Angeles Lakers (traded to Indiana) | NBA G League Ignite (NBA G League) |
| 2 | 48 | Jordan Miller | SF | United States | Los Angeles Clippers | Miami (Sr.) |
| 2 | 49 | Emoni Bates | SF/SG | United States | Cleveland Cavaliers (from Golden State via Utah and New Orleans) (Note: June 20, 2019: Golden State Warriors to New Orleans Pelicans: New Orleans acquired a 2021 second-round pick, a 2023 second-round pick, and cash considerations; Golden State acquired Alen Smailagić; July 7, 2019: New Orleans Pelicans to Utah Jazz: Utah acquired Golden State's 2021 and 2023 second-round picks; New Orleans acquired Derrick Favors; December 24, 2019: Utah Jazz to Cleveland Cavaliers: Cleveland acquired Dante Exum, San Antonio's 2022 second-round pick, and Golden State's 2023 second-round pick; Utah acquired Jordan Clarkson) | Eastern Michigan (So.) |
| 2 | 50 | Keyontae Johnson | SF | United States | Oklahoma City Thunder (from Miami via Boston, Memphis, and Dallas) (Note: July 7, 2017: Miami Heat to Dallas Mavericks: Dallas acquired Josh McRoberts, a 2023 second-round pick, and cash considerations; Miami acquired A.J. Hammons; July 8, 2019: Dallas Mavericks to Memphis Grizzlies: Memphis acquired the draft rights to Satnam Singh, a 2021 second-round pick, and the least favorable of Dallas's and Miami's 2023 second-round picks; Dallas acquired Delon Wright; November 20, 2020: Memphis Grizzlies to Boston Celtics (three-team trade with Portland): Boston acquired two future second-round picks from Memphis; Memphis acquired Mario Hezonja and the draft rights to Desmond Bane; Portland acquired Enes Kanter and cash considerations; February 9, 2023: Boston Celtics to Oklahoma City Thunder: Oklahoma City acquired Justin Jackson, the least favorable of the second-round picks owned by Boston in 2023, and a 2029 second-round pick; Boston acquired Mike Muscala) | Kansas State (Sr.) |
| 2 | 51 | Jalen Wilson | SF | United States | Brooklyn Nets | Kansas (Jr.) |
| 2 | 52 | Toumani Camara | SF/PF | Belgium | Phoenix Suns | Dayton (Sr.) |
| 2 | 53 | Jaylen Clark | SG | United States | Minnesota Timberwolves (from New York via Charlotte) (Note: June 23, 2022: Charlotte Hornets to Minnesota Timberwolves: Charlotte acquired the draft rights to Bryce McGowens; Minnesota acquired the draft rights to Josh Minott and New York's 2023 second-round pick) | UCLA (Jr.) |
| 2 | 54 | Jalen Slawson | SF | United States | Sacramento Kings | Furman (Sr.) |
| 2 | 55 | Isaiah Wong | PG | United States | Indiana Pacers (from Cleveland via Milwaukee and Detroit) (Note: February 6, 2020: Cleveland Cavaliers to Detroit Pistons: Detroit acquired Brandon Knight, John Henson, and the most favorable of Golden State's and Cleveland's 2023 second-round picks; Cleveland acquired Andre Drummond; February 10, 2022: Detroit Pistons to Milwaukee Bucks (four-team trade with Sacramento Kings and L.A. Clippers): Milwaukee acquired Serge Ibaka, two future second-round picks, and cash considerations; Detroit acquired Marvin Bagley III; L.A. Clippers acquired Rodney Hood and Semi Ojeleye; Sacramento acquired Donte DiVincenzo, Josh Jackson, and Trey Lyles) | Miami (Sr.) |
| 2 | 56 | Tarik Biberović^{#} | SF | Bosnia and Herzegovina | Memphis Grizzlies | Fenerbahçe (Turkey) |
| 2 | Chicago Bulls (from Denver via Cleveland; (Note: March 25, 2021: Denver Nuggets to Cleveland Cavaliers: Cleveland acquired Isaiah Hartenstein, a top-46 protected 2023 second-round pick, and a 2027 second-round pick; Denver acquired JaVale McGee; August 27, 2021: Cleveland Cavaliers to Chicago Bulls (three-team trade with Portland Trail Blazers): Chicago acquired Derrick Jones Jr., a lottery-protected 2022 first-round pick, and Denver's protected 2023 second-round pick; Cleveland acquired Lauri Markkanen; Portland acquired Larry Nance Jr.) forfeited due to tampering violation) | | | | | |
| 2 | Philadelphia 76ers (forfeited due to tampering violation) | | | | | |
| 2 | 57 | Trayce Jackson-Davis | PF | United States | Washington Wizards (from Boston via Charlotte, (Note: November 29, 2020: Boston Celtics to Charlotte Hornets: Charlotte acquired Gordon Hayward and 2023 and 2024 second-round picks; Boston acquired a protected 2022 second-round pick; February 10, 2022: Charlotte Hornets to Washington Wizards: Washington acquired Ish Smith, Vernon Carey Jr., and a conditional second-round draft pick in 2023 or 2024 originally from Boston; Charlotte acquired Montrezl Harrell) traded to Golden State) (Note: June 22, 2023: Washington Wizards to Golden State Warriors: Golden State acquired the draft rights to Trayce Jackson-Davis; Washington acquired cash considerations) | Indiana (Sr.) |
| 2 | 58 | Chris Livingston | SF | United States | Milwaukee Bucks | Kentucky (Fr.) |

== Notable undrafted players ==
These players were not selected in the 2023 NBA draft, but have played at least one regular-season or playoff game in the NBA.

| Player | Pos. | Nationality | School/club team |
|---|---|---|---|
| Timmy Allen | SF | United States | Texas (Sr.) |
| Marcus Bagley | PF | United States | Arizona State (Jr.) |
| Damion Baugh | SG | United States | TCU (Sr.) |
| Leaky Black | SF | United States | North Carolina (Sr.) |
| Colin Castleton | C | United States | Florida (Sr.) |
| Malcolm Cazalon | PG | France | Mega Leks (Serbia) |
| Yuri Collins | PG | United States | Saint Louis (Sr.) |
| Javonte Cooke | PG | United States | Winston-Salem State (Sr.) |
| Ricky Council IV | SG | United States | Arkansas (Jr.) |
| Dexter Dennis | SF | United States | Texas A&M (Sr.) |
| Tosan Evbuomwan | SF | United Kingdom | Princeton (Sr.) |
| Adam Flagler | SG | United States | Baylor (Sr.) |
| Alex Fudge | SF/PF | United States | Florida (So.) |
| Andrew Funk | SG | United States | Penn State (Sr.) |
| Myron Gardner | SG | United States | Little Rock (Sr.) |
| Jazian Gortman | PG | United States | YNG Dreamerz (Overtime Elite) |
| Elijah Harkless | SG | United States | UNLV (Sr.) |
| D'Moi Hodge | SG | British Virgin Islands | Missouri (Sr.) |
| Trey Jemison | C | United States | UAB (Sr.) |
| Yuki Kawamura | PG | Japan | Yokohama B-Corsairs (Japan) |
| Jaylen Martin | SF | United States | YNG Dreamerz (Overtime Elite) |
| Nathan Mensah | PF | Ghana | San Diego State (Sr.) |
| Pete Nance | PF | United States | North Carolina (Sr.) |
| Miles Norris | SF/PF | United States | UC Santa Barbara (Sr.) |
| Markquis Nowell | PG | United States | Kansas State (Sr.) |
| Drew Peterson | PF | United States | USC (Sr.) |
| Craig Porter Jr. | PG | United States | Wichita State (Sr.) |
| Liam Robbins | C | United States | Vanderbilt (Sr.) |
| Adama Sanogo | PF/C | Mali | UConn (Jr.) |
| Malachi Smith | SG | United States | Gonzaga (Sr.) |
| Terquavion Smith | PG | United States | NC State (So.) |
| Drew Timme | C | United States | Gonzaga (Sr.) |
| Jacob Toppin | SF | United States | Kentucky (Sr.) |
| Oscar Tshiebwe | C | Democratic Republic of the Congo | Kentucky ((Sr.) |

== Trades involving draft picks ==
=== Pre-draft trades ===
Prior to the draft, the following trades were made and resulted in exchanges of draft picks between teams.

=== Post-draft trades ===
Post-draft trades are made after the draft begins. These trades are usually not confirmed until the next day or after free agency officially begins.

== Combine ==
The 9th G League Elite Camp took place on May 13–14, from which certain participants will be selected to join the main draft combine.

The primary portion of the 2023 NBA draft combine was held from May 15–21 in Chicago, Illinois.

== Draft lottery ==
External videos
- 2023 NBA Draft Lottery Drawing, NBA's official YouTube channel. May 16, 2023.

The NBA draft lottery was held on May 16.

| Denotes the actual lottery result |

| Team | 2022–23 record | Lottery chances | Lottery probabilities | | | | | | | | | | | | | |
| Team | 2022–23 record | Lottery chances | 1st | 2nd | 3rd | 4th | 5th | 6th | 7th | 8th | 9th | 10th | 11th | 12th | 13th | 14th |
|---|---|---|---|---|---|---|---|---|---|---|---|---|---|---|---|---|
| Detroit Pistons | 17–65 | 140 | 14.0% | 13.4% | 12.7% | 12.0% | 47.9% | – | – | – | – | – | – | – | – | – |
| Houston Rockets | 22–60 | 140 | 14.0% | 13.4% | 12.7% | 12.0% | 27.8% | 20.0% | – | – | – | – | – | – | – | – |
| San Antonio Spurs | 22–60 | 140 | 14.0% | 13.4% | 12.7% | 12.0% | 14.8% | 26.0% | 7.0% | – | – | – | – | – | – | – |
| Charlotte Hornets | 27–55 | 125 | 12.5% | 12.2% | 11.9% | 11.5% | 7.2% | 25.7% | 16.8% | 2.2% | – | – | – | – | – | – |
| Portland Trail Blazers | 33–49 | 105 | 10.5% | 10.5% | 10.6% | 10.5% | 2.2% | 19.6% | 26.7% | 8.7% | 0.6% | – | – | – | – | – |
| Orlando Magic | 34–48 | 90 | 9.0% | 9.2% | 9.4% | 9.6% | – | 8.6% | 29.7% | 20.6% | 3.7% | 0.2% | – | – | – | – |
| Indiana Pacers | 35–47 | 68 | 6.8% | 7.1% | 7.5% | 7.9% | – | – | 19.7% | 35.6% | 13.8% | 1.4% | <0.1% | – | – | – |
| Washington Wizards | 35–47 | 67 | 6.7% | 7.0% | 7.4% | 7.8% | – | – | – | 32.9% | 31.1% | 6.6% | 0.4% | <0.1% | – | – |
| Utah Jazz | 37–45 | 45 | 4.5% | 4.8% | 5.2% | 5.7% | – | – | – | – | 50.7% | 25.9% | 3.0% | 0.1% | <0.1% | – |
| Dallas Mavericks (Note: New York will receive the pick if it is No. 11–30, otherwise Dallas will retain it.) | 38–44 | 30 | 3.0% | 3.3% | 3.6% | 4.0% | – | – | – | – | – | 65.9% | 19.0% | 1.2% | <0.1% | <0.1% |
| Chicago Bulls (Note: Orlando will receive the pick if it is No. 5–30, otherwise Chicago will retain it.) | 40–42 | 18 | 1.8% | 2.0% | 2.2% | 2.5% | – | – | – | – | – | – | 77.6% | 13.5% | 0.4% | <0.1% |
| Oklahoma City Thunder | 40–42 | 17 | 1.7% | 1.9% | 2.1% | 2.4% | – | – | – | – | – | – | – | 85.2% | 6.7% | 0.1% |
| Toronto Raptors | 41–41 | 10 | 1.0% | 1.1% | 1.2% | 1.4% | – | – | – | – | – | – | – | – | 92.9% | 2.3% |
| New Orleans Pelicans | 42–40 | 5 | 0.5% | 0.6% | 0.6% | 0.7% | – | – | – | – | – | – | – | – | – | 97.6% |

== Eligibility and entrants ==
The draft is conducted under the eligibility rules established in the league's 2017 collective bargaining agreement (CBA) with its players' union, with special modifications agreed to by both parties due to disruptions caused by the COVID-19 pandemic. The previous CBA that ended the 2011 lockout instituted no immediate changes to the draft, but it called for a committee of owners and players to discuss further charges.

- All drafted players must be at least 19 years old during the calendar year of the draft. In terms of dates, players who were eligible for the 2023 NBA draft must have been born on or before December 31, 2004.
- Since the 2016 draft, the following rules are, as implemented by the NCAA Division I council for that division:
  - Declaration for the draft no longer results in automatic loss of college eligibility. As long as a player does not sign a contract with a professional team outside the NBA or sign with an agent, he retains college eligibility as long as he makes a timely withdrawal from the draft.
  - NCAA players now have 10 days after the end of the NBA draft combine to withdraw from the draft. Since the combine is normally held in mid-May, the current deadline is about five weeks after the previous mid-April deadline.
  - NCAA players may participate in the draft combine and are allowed to attend one tryout per year with each NBA team without losing college eligibility.
  - NCAA players may now enter and withdraw from the draft up to two times without loss of eligibility. Previously, the NCAA treated a second declaration of draft eligibility as a permanent loss of college eligibility.

=== Early entrants ===
Players who were not automatically eligible had to declare their eligibility for the draft by notifying the NBA offices in writing no later than at least 60 days before the event. For the 2023 draft, the date fell on April 23. Under the CBA a player may withdraw his name from consideration from the draft at any time before the final declaration deadline, which usually falls 10 days before the draft at 5:00 pm EDT (2100 UTC). Under current NCAA rules, players usually have until 10 days after the draft combine to withdraw from the draft and retain college eligibility. They must have withdrawn on or before May 31, 22 days prior to this draft.

A player who has hired an agent retains his remaining college eligibility regardless of whether he is drafted after an evaluation from the NBA Undergraduate Advisory Committee. Players who declare for the NBA draft and are not selected have the opportunity to return to their school for at least another year only after terminating all agreements with their agents, who must have been certified.

==== College underclassmen ====
- (United States) Marcus Bagley – F, Arizona State (sophomore)
- (United States) Amari Bailey – G, UCLA (freshman)
- (United States) Emoni Bates – F, Eastern Michigan (sophomore)
- (Canada) Charles Bediako – C, Alabama (sophomore)
- (United States) Anthony Black – G, Arkansas (freshman)
- (United States) Kobe Bufkin – G, Michigan (sophomore)
- (United States) Jaylen Clark – G, UCLA (junior)
- (United States) Noah Clowney – F, Alabama (freshman)
- (United States) Ricky Council IV – G, Arkansas (junior)
- (United States) Gradey Dick – G, Kansas (freshman)
- (United States) Alex Fudge – F, Florida (sophomore)
- (United States) Keyonte George – G, Baylor (freshman)
- (United States) Wendell Green Jr. – G, Auburn (junior)
- (Senegal) Mouhamed Gueye – F, Washington State (sophomore)
- (United States) Jordan Hawkins – G, UConn (sophomore)
- (United States) Taylor Hendricks – F, UCF (freshman)
- (United States) Jalen Hood-Schifino – G, Indiana (freshman)
- (United States) Jett Howard – G, Michigan (freshman)
- (United States) Andre Jackson Jr. – F, UConn (junior)
- (United States) G. G. Jackson – F, South Carolina (freshman)
- (United States) Colby Jones – G, Xavier (junior)
- (United States) Maxwell Lewis – F, Pepperdine (sophomore)
- (United States) Dereck Lively II – C, Duke (freshman)
- (United States) Chris Livingston – F, Kentucky (freshman)
- (United States) Mike Miles Jr. – G, TCU (junior)
- (United States) Brandon Miller – F, Alabama (freshman)
- (United States) Kris Murray – F, Iowa (junior)
- (United States) Julian Phillips – F, Tennessee (freshman)
- (United States) Brandin Podziemski – G, Santa Clara (sophomore)
- (United States) Justin Powell – G, Washington State (junior)
- (Canada) Olivier-Maxence Prosper – F, Marquette (junior)
- (Mali) Adama Sanogo – F, UConn (junior)
- (United States) Brice Sensabaugh – F, Ohio State (freshman)
- (United States) Nick Smith Jr. – G, Arkansas (freshman)
- (United States) Terquavion Smith – G, NC State (sophomore)
- (Puerto Rico) / (United States) Julian Strawther – G, Gonzaga (junior)
- (Lithuania) Ąžuolas Tubelis – F, Arizona (junior)
- (United States) Jarace Walker – F, Houston (freshman)
- (United States) Cason Wallace – G, Kentucky (freshman)
- (United States) Jordan Walsh – G/F, Arkansas (freshman)
- (United States) Dariq Whitehead – F, Duke (freshman)
- (United States) Cam Whitmore – F, Villanova (freshman)
- (United States) Jalen Wilson – F, Kansas (junior)
- (United States) Tyrese Wineglass – G, Southwestern Adventist (junior)

==== College seniors ====
"Redshirt" refers to players who were redshirt seniors in the 2022–23 season. "Graduate" refers to players who were graduate transfers in 2022–23.

- (Nigeria) Kaodirichi Akobundu-Ehiogu – F, Memphis (redshirt)
- (United States) Damezi Anderson Jr. – F, Detroit (graduate)
- (United States) Chase Audige – G, Northwestern (graduate)
- (United States) Grant Basile – F, Virginia Tech (graduate)
- (United States) Manny Bates – F, Butler
- (United States) Damion Baugh – G, TCU
- (United States) Kobe Brown – G, Missouri
- (Belgium) Toumani Camara – F, Dayton
- (United States) Tyger Campbell – G, UCLA
- (United States) Yuri Collins – G, Saint Louis
- (United States) Alou Dillon – F, Purdue–Northwest
- (United Kingdom) Tosan Evbuomwan – F, Princeton
- (United States) Adam Flagler – G, Baylor (redshirt)
- (United States) Armaan Franklin – G, Virginia
- (United States) Myron Gardner – F, Little Rock
- (United States) De'Vion Harmon – G, Texas Tech
- (United States) Joey Hauser – F, Michigan State
- (United States) Trayce Jackson-Davis – F, Indiana
- (United States) / (Mexico) Jaime Jaquez Jr. – G/F, UCLA
- (United States) Keyontae Johnson – F, Kansas State
- (United States) Jackson Kenyon – F, Miami (Ohio)
- (United States) Seth Lundy – G, Penn State
- (United States) Demetrius Mims – F, Gannon
- (United States) Omari Moore – G, San Jose State
- (United States) Landers Nolley II – G, Cincinnati
- (United States) Jack Nunge – F, Xavier
- (Canada) Nick Ongenda – C, DePaul
- (Serbia) Uroš Plavšić – C, Tennessee
- (United States) Terry Roberts – G, Georgia
- (United States) Marcus Sasser – G, Houston
- (United States) Ben Sheppard – G, Belmont
- (United States) Grant Sherfield – G, Oklahoma
- (United States) Dontrell Shuler – G, Cal State San Bernardino
- (United States) Malachi Smith – G, Gonzaga
- (United States) Justice Sueing – F, Ohio State (redshirt)
- (United States) Drew Timme – F, Gonzaga
- (United States) Jacob Toppin – F, Kentucky
- (Democratic Republic of the Congo) Oscar Tshiebwe – F, Kentucky
- (United States) Tyler Willoughby – G, Voorhees
- (United States) Isaiah Wong – G, Miami

==== Other ====
- (France) Sidy Cissoko – G, NBA G League Ignite (NBA G League)
- (United States) Jordan Haber (Note: Haber never played organized basketball and had no intention to play professionally, but entered the draft via a loophole he discovered to win a bet with his friends.) – N/A, Florida (graduate)
- (United States) Scoot Henderson – G, NBA G League Ignite (NBA G League)
- (New Zealand) / (United States) Mojave King – G, NBA G League Ignite (NBA G League)
- (Canada) Leonard Miller – F, NBA G League Ignite (NBA G League)
- (United States) Amen Thompson – G, City Reapers (Overtime Elite)
- (United States) Ausar Thompson – G, City Reapers (Overtime Elite)

==== International players ====
- Bilal Coulibaly – G, Metropolitans 92 (France)
- / (Algeria) Nadir Hifi – G, ESSM Le Portel (France)
- (Nigeria) James Nnaji – C, FC Barcelona (Spain)
- (France) Rayan Rupert – G, New Zealand Breakers (Australia)
- Márcio Santos – C, Sesi Franca (Brazil)
- Enzo Shahrvin – F, Pau Orthez (France)
- Tristan Vukčević – F, Partizan Belgrade (Serbia)
- Victor Wembanyama – F/C, Metropolitans 92 (France)

=== Automatically eligible entrants ===
Players who do not meet the criteria for "international" players are automatically eligible if they meet any of the following criteria:

- They have no remaining college eligibility.
- If they graduated from high school in the U.S., but did not enroll in a U.S. college or university, four years have passed since their high school class graduated.
- They have signed a contract with a professional basketball team not in the NBA, anywhere in the world, and have played under the contract.

Players who meet the criteria for "international" players are automatically eligible if they meet any of the following criteria:

- They are at least 22 years old during the calendar year of the draft. In term of dates players born on or before December 31, 2001, are automatically eligible for the 2023 draft.
- They have signed a contract with a professional basketball team not in the NBA within the United States, and have played under that contract.

Other automatically eligible players
| Player | Team | Note | Ref. |
|---|---|---|---|
| (Nigeria) Efe Abogidi | NBA G League Ignite (NBA G League) | Left Washington State in 2022; playing professionally since the 2022–23 season | |
| (South Sudan) / (Australia) Lat Mayen | Cairns Taipans (Australia) | Left Nebraska in 2022; playing professionally since the 2022–23 season | |
| (Iceland) Styrmir Snær Þrastarson | Þór Þorlákshöfn (Iceland) | Left Davidson in 2022; playing professionally since the 2022–23 season | |

== Invited attendees ==
The NBA annually invites players to sit in the so-called "green room", a special room set aside at the draft site for the invited players plus their families and agents. This season, the following 25 players were invited (listed alphabetically).

- (United States) Anthony Black, Arkansas
- (United States) Kobe Bufkin, Michigan
- (United States) Noah Clowney, Alabama
- Bilal Coulibaly, Metropolitans 92 (France)
- (United States) Gradey Dick, Kansas
- (United States) Keyonte George, Baylor
- (United States) Jordan Hawkins, Connecticut
- (United States) Scoot Henderson, NBA G League Ignite (NBA G League)
- (United States) Taylor Hendricks, UCF
- (United States) Jalen Hood-Schifino, Indiana
- (United States) Jett Howard, Michigan
- (Mexico) / (United States) Jaime Jaquez Jr., UCLA
- (United States) Dereck Lively II, Duke
- (United States) Brandon Miller, Alabama
- (United States) Kris Murray, Iowa (declined invitation)
- (United States) Brandin Podziemski, Santa Clara
- (Canada) Olivier-Maxence Prosper, Marquette
- (France) Rayan Rupert, New Zealand Breakers (Australia/New Zealand)
- (United States) Nick Smith Jr., Arkansas
- (United States) Amen Thompson, City Reapers (Overtime Elite)
- (United States) Ausar Thompson, City Reapers (Overtime Elite)
- (United States) Jarace Walker, Houston
- (United States) Cason Wallace, Kentucky
- Victor Wembanyama, Metropolitans 92 (France)
- (United States) Cam Whitmore, Villanova

== See also ==
- List of first overall NBA draft picks
