= Dariq Whitehead =

American basketball player (born 2004)

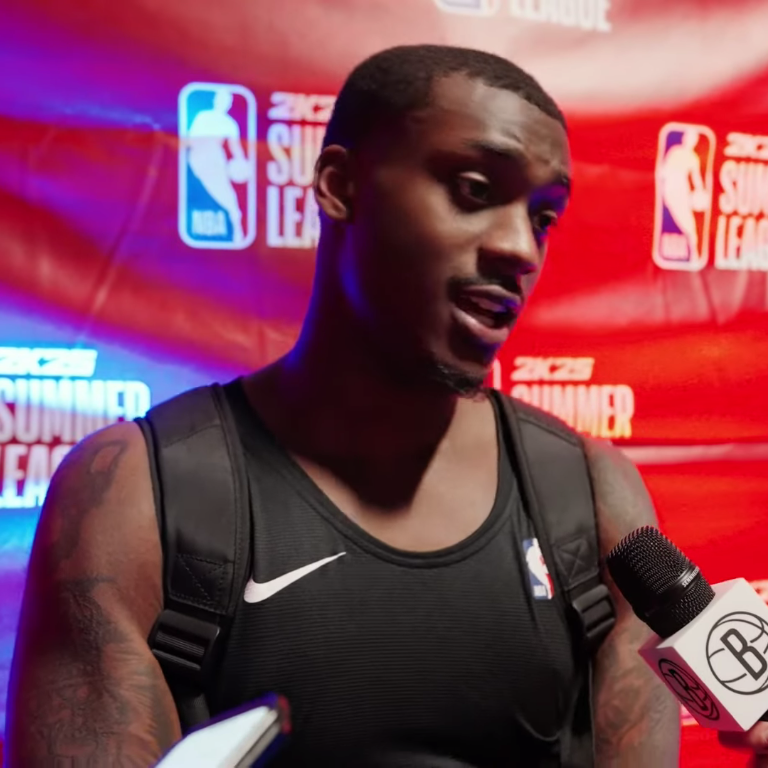
- Whitehead during the 2024 NBA Summer League

No. 1 – Oklahoma City Blue
- Position: Small forward / shooting guard
- League: NBA G League

Personal information
- Born: August 1, 2004 (age 22) Newark, New Jersey, U.S.
- Listed height: 6 ft 6 in (1.98 m)
- Listed weight: 220 lb (100 kg)

Career information
- High school: Montverde Academy (Montverde, Florida)
- College: Duke (2022–2023)
- NBA draft: 2023: 1st round, 22nd overall pick
- Drafted by: Brooklyn Nets
- Playing career: 2023–present

Career history
- 2023–2025: Brooklyn Nets
- 2023–2025: →Long Island Nets
- 2025–present: Oklahoma City Blue
- 2026: Memphis Grizzlies

Career highlights
- Naismith High School Player of the Year (2022); McDonald's All-American Game MVP (2022); Nike Hoop Summit (2022)
- Stats at NBA.com
- Stats at Basketball Reference

Dariq Miller-Whitehead (/dəˈriːk/ də-REEK; born August 1, 2004) is an American professional basketball player for the Oklahoma City Blue of the NBA G League. He played college basketball for the Duke Blue Devils. He was a consensus five-star recruit and one of the top players in the 2022 class. As a senior, he was named Mr. Basketball USA and the Naismith Prep Player of the Year Award.

== High school career ==
Whitehead attended Montverde Academy in Montverde, Florida. Whitehead won the Naismith Prep Player of the Year Award his senior year in 2022. He was selected to play in the 2022 McDonald's All-American Boys Game. Whitehead was named the McDonald's All-American Game MVP, where he had 13 points, seven rebounds, and seven assists.

Whitehead was a consensus five-star recruit and one of the top players in the 2022 class, according to major recruiting services. On August 1, 2021, he committed to playing college basketball for Duke over offers from Florida State, Kansas and NBA G League.

College recruiting
Name	Hometown	School	Height	Weight	Commit date
Dariq Whitehead; SF	Newark, NJ	Montverde Academy (FL)	6 ft 6 in (1.98 m)	190 lb (86 kg)	Aug 1, 2021
Dariq Whitehead; SF	Recruit ratings: Rivals: 247Sports: ESPN: (94)				
Overall recruit ranking: Rivals: 1 247Sports: 3 ESPN: 2
Note: In many cases, Scout, Rivals, 247Sports, On3, and ESPN may conflict in their listings of height and weight.; In these cases, the average was taken. ESPN grades are on a 100-point scale.; Sources: "Duke 2022 Basketball Commitments". Rivals.; "2022 Duke Blue Devils Recruiting Class". ESPN.; "2022 Team Ranking". Rivals.

== College career ==
On November 18, 2022, Whitehead made his Duke debut recording 6 points, 2 rebounds and 2 steals in 16 minutes off the bench in a 92–58 win against Delaware. On December 6, 2022, Whitehead scored eight points and set a career-high six rebounds and three assists in 21 minutes off the bench in a 74–62 win against Iowa. On December 10, 2022, Whitehead made his first college career start scoring 15 points in 25 minutes of action in an 82–55 win against UMES which also marked the first time Duke started five freshmen in program history. On January 7, 2023, Whitehead scored a career high 18 points and 33 minutes played and matching previously set career highs in 6 field goals made and 4 3-pointers made, while shooting 50% (6-of-12) from the field and 50% (4-of-8) from long range during a 65–64 win against Boston College. On February 18, 2023, Whitehead made a career-high-tying four 3-pointers (4-of-6) en route to 14 points with a career-high-tying three assists and two steals during a 77–55 win against Syracuse marking his eighth time scoring in double figures in an 11-game span. On March 10, 2023, Whitehead recorded 16 points in 19 minutes against Miami on 3/10 in the ACC Tournament semifinals on 4-of-8 shooting, including 2-of-3 shooting from beyond the arc. On March 11, 2023, Whitehead logged four steals off the bench in the ACC title game in a 59–49 win against Virginia, matching the most by any Duke player in a game during the 2022–23 season. In two NCAA Tournament games, Whitehead recorded averages of 10.5 points on .615 shooting from the field and .625 shooting from distance with 3.0 rebounds in 28.0 minutes per contest... Scored 13 points (5-of-7 FG, 3-of-3 3FG) in 23 minutes off the bench in Duke's NCAA Tournament win against Oral Roberts. Played a career-high-tying 33 minutes in Duke's second-round NCAA Tournament game against Tennessee, posting eight points (3-of-6 FG, 2-of-5 3FG) with two rebounds and a career-high-tying two blocks.

== Professional career ==
=== Brooklyn Nets (2023–2025) ===
The Brooklyn Nets selected Whitehead with the 22nd overall pick in the 2023 NBA draft and on July 10, 2023, he signed with the team. Throughout his rookie and sophomore seasons, he has been assigned several times to the Long Island Nets. Whitehead made two appearances for Brooklyn during the 2023–24 NBA season, averaging 1.5 points, 2.0 rebounds, and 1.5 assists.

Whitehead made 20 appearances for the Nets during the 2024–25 NBA season, posting averages of 5.7 points, 1.5 rebounds, and 0.6 assists. On October 13, 2025, Whitehead, alongside Drew Timme, was waived from the Nets.

=== Oklahoma City Blue (2025–2026) ===
On October 17, 2025, Whitehead reportedly signed an Exhibit 10 contract with the Oklahoma City Thunder, but was waived by the following day. On November 3, it was announced that Whitehead had joined the Thunder's G-League affiliate, the Oklahoma City Blue.

=== Memphis Grizzlies (2026) ===
On April 3, 2026, Whitehead signed a 10-day contract with the Memphis Grizzlies. On April 12, Whitehead scored a career-high 26 points in a 101-132 loss to the Houston Rockets. He appeared in six games for the Grizzlies, averaging 16.3 points, four rebounds, and 1.5 assists.

== Career statistics ==
Legend
GP	Games played	GS	Games started	MPG	Minutes per game
FG%	Field goal percentage	3P%	3-point field goal percentage	FT%	Free throw percentage
RPG	Rebounds per game	APG	Assists per game	SPG	Steals per game
BPG	Blocks per game	PPG	Points per game	**Bold**	Career high

=== NBA ===
Year	Team	GP	GS	MPG	FG%	3P%	FT%	RPG	APG	SPG	BPG	PPG
2023–24	Brooklyn	2	0	12.0	.200	.000	.500	2.0	**1.5**	.0	**.5**	1.5
2024–25	Brooklyn	**20**	0	12.3	**.406**	**.446**	.600	1.5	.6	.3	.1	5.7
2025–26	Memphis	6	**2**	**30.5**	.398	.317	**.714**	**4.0**	**1.5**	**.7**	.0	**16.3**
Career		28	2	16.2	.397	.380	.643	2.0	.9	.4	.1	7.7

=== College ===
Year	Team	GP	GS	MPG	FG%	3P%	FT%	RPG	APG	SPG	BPG	PPG
2022–23	Duke	28	7	20.1	.408	.411	.885	2.4	1.0	.8	.2	8.3
Career		28	7	20.1	.408	.411	.885	2.4	1.0	.8	.2	8.3

== Personal life ==
His brother, Tahir, played in the National Football League (NFL).
