= 2022–23 Duke Blue Devils men's basketball team =

American college basketball season

2022–23 Duke Blue Devils men's basketball

ACC tournament champions

NCAA tournament, Second Round
- Conference: Atlantic Coast Conference

Ranking
- Coaches: No. 18
- AP: No. 12
- Record: 27–9 (14–6 ACC)
- Head coach: Jon Scheyer (1st season)
- Associate head coach: Chris Carrawell
- Assistant coaches: Jai Lucas; Amile Jefferson
- Home arena: Cameron Indoor Stadium

2022–23 ACC men's basketball standings
	Conf.				Overall
Team	W		L	PCT	W		L	PCT
No. 16 Miami (FL)	15	–	5	.750	29	–	8	.784
No. 14 Virginia	15	–	5	.750	25	–	8	.758
Clemson	14	–	6	.700	23	–	11	.676
No. 12 Duke †	14	–	6	.700	27	–	9	.750
Pittsburgh	14	–	6	.700	24	–	12	.667
NC State	12	–	8	.600	23	–	11	.676
North Carolina	11	–	9	.550	20	–	13	.606
Wake Forest	10	–	10	.500	19	–	14	.576
Syracuse	10	–	10	.500	17	–	15	.531
Boston College	9	–	11	.450	16	–	17	.485
Virginia Tech	8	–	12	.400	19	–	15	.559
Florida State	7	–	13	.350	9	–	23	.281
Georgia Tech	6	–	14	.300	15	–	18	.455
Notre Dame	3	–	17	.150	11	–	21	.344
Louisville	2	–	18	.100	4	–	28	.125
† 2023 ACC tournament winner Rankings from AP poll

The 2022–23 Duke Blue Devils men's basketball team represented Duke University during the 2022–23 NCAA Division I men's basketball season. The Blue Devils played their home games at Cameron Indoor Stadium in Durham, North Carolina, as a member of the Atlantic Coast Conference. The finished the season 27–9, 14–6 in ACC play to finish a three-way tie for third place. As the No. 4 seed in the ACC tournament, they defeated Pittsburgh, Miami, and Virginia to win the tournament championship. The championship was their 22nd ACC tournament victory in program history. As a result, they received the conference's automatic bid to the NCAA tournament as the No. 5 seed in the East region. There, they defeated Oral Roberts before being defeated in the second round by Tennessee.

== Previous season ==
The Blue Devils finished the 2021–22 season 32–7, 16–4 in ACC play to win the regular season championship. They defeated Syracuse and Miami in the ACC tournament before losing to Virginia Tech in the championship game. They received an at-large bid to the NCAA tournament as the No. 2 seed in the West region. They defeated Cal State Fullerton, Michigan State, Texas Tech, and Arkansas to advance to the Final Four. There, they met rival North Carolina for the first time in an NCAA tournament game. In coach Mike Krzyzewsk's final game, the Blue Devils lost to the Tar Heels.

After 42 seasons leading Duke, head coach Krzyzewski retired at the end of the season. Associate head coach Jon Scheyer was named as his replacement.

== Offseason ==
=== Departures ===
Due to COVID-19, the NCAA ruled in October 2020 that the 2020–21 season would not count against the eligibility of any basketball player, thus giving all players the option to return in 2021–22.

Duke Blue Devils departures
Name	Number	Pos.	Height	Weight	Year	Hometown	Reason for departure
Joey Baker	13	SF	6'7"	205	Senior	Fayetteville, NC	Graduated / transferred to Michigan

==== Outgoing transfers ====
Duke outgoing transfers
Name	Number	Pos.	Height	Weight	Year	Hometown	New school	Source
Joey Baker	13	SF	6'7"	205	Senior	Fayetteville, NC	Graduated / transferred to Michigan	

=== Acquisitions ===
==== Incoming transfers ====
Duke incoming transfers
Name	Number	Pos.	Height	Weight	Year	Hometown	Previous school	Years remaining	Date eligible	Source
Kale Catchings	12	F	6'5"	215	Graduate student	O'Fallon, Missouri	Transferred from Harvard	1	June 11, 2022	
Jacob Grandison	13	G	6'6"	190	Graduate student	Oakland, California	Transferred from Illinois	1	June 11, 2022	
Ryan Young	15	C	6'10"	235	Graduate student	Stewartsville, New Jersey	Transferred from Northwestern	1	June 11, 2022	

==== Recruiting classes ====
===== 2022 recruiting class =====
College recruiting
Name	Hometown	School	Height	Weight	Commit date
Dereck Lively II; C	Chester, PA	Westtown School	7 ft 1 in (2.16 m)	215 lb (98 kg)	Sep 20, 2021
Dereck Lively II; C	Recruit ratings: Rivals: 247Sports: ESPN: (94)				
Dariq Whitehead; SF	Newark, NJ	Montverde Academy (FL)	6 ft 6 in (1.98 m)	190 lb (86 kg)	Aug 1, 2021
Dariq Whitehead; SF	Recruit ratings: Rivals: 247Sports: ESPN: (94)				
Kyle Filipowski; PF / C	Westtown, NY	Wilbraham & Monson Academy (MA)	6 ft 11 in (2.11 m)	230 lb (100 kg)	Apr 2, 2021
Kyle Filipowski; PF / C	Recruit ratings: Rivals: 247Sports: ESPN: (93)				
Tyrese Proctor*; PG	Canberra, Australia	NBA Global Academy	6 ft 4 in (1.93 m)	170 lb (77 kg)	Apr 7, 2022
Tyrese Proctor*; PG	Recruit ratings: Rivals: 247Sports: ESPN: (91)				
Mark Mitchell; PF	Shawnee Mission, KS	Sunrise Christian Academy	6 ft 8 in (2.03 m)	215 lb (98 kg)	Dec 10, 2021
Mark Mitchell; PF	Recruit ratings: Rivals: 247Sports: ESPN: (89)				
Jaden Schutt; SG	Yorkville, IL	Yorkville High School	6 ft 4 in (1.93 m)	175 lb (79 kg)	Sep 2, 2021
Jaden Schutt; SG	Recruit ratings: Rivals: 247Sports: ESPN: (85)				
Christian Reeves; C	Charlotte, NC	Oak Hill Academy (VA)	6 ft 11 in (2.11 m)	210 lb (95 kg)	Dec 14, 2021
Christian Reeves; C	Recruit ratings: Rivals: 247Sports: ESPN: (80)				
Overall recruit ranking:
Note: In many cases, Scout, Rivals, 247Sports, On3, and ESPN may conflict in their listings of height and weight.; In these cases, the average was taken. ESPN grades are on a 100-point scale.; Sources: "2022 Team Ranking". Rivals.

*Originally class of 2023, but reclassified to 2022.

===== 2023 recruiting class =====
College recruiting (2023)
Name	Hometown	School	Height	Weight	Commit date
Sean Stewart; PF	Windermere, FL	Windermere Prep	6 ft 8 in (2.03 m)	230 lb (100 kg)	Dec 23, 2021
Sean Stewart; PF	Recruit ratings: Rivals: 247Sports: ESPN: (94)				
Caleb Foster; PG	Mouth of Wilson, VA	Oak Hill Academy	6 ft 3 in (1.91 m)	230 lb (100 kg)	Sep 16, 2021
Caleb Foster; PG	Recruit ratings: Rivals: 247Sports: ESPN: (90)				
Jared McCain; CG	Corona, CA	Centennial High School	6 ft 2 in (1.88 m)	170 lb (77 kg)	Mar 18, 2022
Jared McCain; CG	Recruit ratings: Rivals: 247Sports: ESPN: (90)				
Overall recruit ranking:
Note: In many cases, Scout, Rivals, 247Sports, On3, and ESPN may conflict in their listings of height and weight.; In these cases, the average was taken. ESPN grades are on a 100-point scale.; Sources: "2023 Team Ranking". Rivals.

=== 2022 NBA draft ===
Round	Pick	Player	Position	NBA team	Source
1	1	Paolo Banchero	PF	Orlando Magic	
1	15	Mark Williams	C	Charlotte Hornets	
1	16	AJ Griffin	SF	Atlanta Hawks	
1	26	Wendell Moore Jr.	SF	Dallas Mavericks traded to Minnesota Timberwolves	
2	42	Trevor Keels	SG	New York Knicks	

== Roster ==
2022–23 Duke Blue Devils men's basketball team
Players
Coaches

Pos.	#	Name	Height	Weight	Year	Previous school	Hometown
F	0	Dariq Whitehead	6 ft 7 in (2.01 m)	220 lb (100 kg)	Fr	Montverde Academy	Newark, NJ
C	1	Dereck Lively II	7 ft 1 in (2.16 m)	230 lb (104 kg)	Fr	Westtown School	Philadelphia, PA
G	2	Jaylen Blakes	6 ft 2 in (1.88 m)	200 lb (91 kg)	So	Blair Academy	Somerset, NJ
G	3	Jeremy Roach	6 ft 2 in (1.88 m)	180 lb (82 kg)	Jr	Paul VI Catholic	Leesburg, VA
G	5	Tyrese Proctor	6 ft 5 in (1.96 m)	175 lb (79 kg)	Fr	NBA Global Academy	Sydney, AU
F	12	Kale Catchings	6 ft 5 in (1.96 m)	215 lb (98 kg)	GS	Harvard	O'Fallon, MO
G	13	Jacob Grandison	6 ft 6 in (1.98 m)	190 lb (86 kg)	GS	Illinois	Oakland, CA
G	14	Jaden Schutt	6 ft 5 in (1.96 m)	185 lb (84 kg)	Fr	Yorkville	Yorkville, IL
C	15	Ryan Young	6 ft 10 in (2.08 m)	235 lb (107 kg)	GS	Northwestern	Stewartsville, NJ
C	21	Christian Reeves	7 ft 1 in (2.16 m)	245 lb (111 kg)	Fr	Oak Hill Academy	Charlotte, NC
F	25	Mark Mitchell	6 ft 8 in (2.03 m)	220 lb (100 kg)	Fr	Sunrise Christian Academy	Kansas City, KS
C	30	Kyle Filipowski	7 ft 0 in (2.13 m)	230 lb (104 kg)	Fr	Wilbraham & Monson Academy	Westtown, NY
G	41	Max Johns (W)	6 ft 5 in (1.96 m)	205 lb (93 kg)	GS	Princeton	High Point, NC
C	52	Stanley Borden (W)	7 ft 0 in (2.13 m)	240 lb (109 kg)	So	Istanbul International Community School	Istanbul, Turkey
G	55	Spencer Hubbard (W)	5 ft 8 in (1.73 m)	160 lb (73 kg)	Jr	Harvard-Westlake	Los Angeles, CA

Head coach

- Jon Scheyer (Duke)

Assistant coach(es)

- Chris Carrawell (Duke)
- Jai Lucas (Texas)
- Amile Jefferson (Duke)

Legend

- (C) Team captain
- (S) Suspended
- (I) Ineligible
- (W) Walk-on
- Injured
- Current redshirt

Roster
Last update: July 1, 2022

== Schedule and results ==
Date time, TV	Rank^{#}	Opponent^{#}	Result	Record	High points	High rebounds	High assists	Site (attendance) city, state
Exhibition
November 2, 2022*; 7:00 p.m., ACCNX	No. 7	Fayetteville State	W 82–45	–	17 – Grandison	6 – Tied	8 – Roach	Cameron Indoor Stadium (9,314); Durham, NC
Regular season
November 7, 2022*; 7:00 p.m., ACCN	No. 7	Jacksonville	W 71–44	1–0	18 – Mitchell	12 – Filipowski	5 – Grandison	Cameron Indoor Stadium (9,314); Durham, NC
November 11, 2022*; 6:30 p.m., ACCN	No. 7	USC Upstate	W 84–38	2–0	15 – Filipowski	10 – Filipowski	7 – Roach	Cameron Indoor Stadium (9,314); Durham, NC
November 15, 2022*; 9:30 p.m., ESPN	No. 7	vs. No. 6 Kansas; Champions Classic	L 64–69	2–1	17 – Filipowski	14 – Filipowski	3 – Proctor	Gainbridge Fieldhouse (15,828); Indianapolis, IN
November 18, 2022*; 7:00 p.m., ACCRSN	No. 7	Delaware	W 92–58	3–1	18 – Filipowski	10 – Proctor	4 – Tied	Cameron Indoor Stadium (9,314); Durham, NC
November 21, 2022*; 8:30 p.m., ACCN	No. 8	Bellarmine	W 74–57	4–1	18 – Filipowski	8 – Tied	5 – Roach	Cameron Indoor Stadium (9,314); Durham, NC
November 24, 2022*; 3:00 p.m., ESPN	No. 8	vs. Oregon State; Phil Knight Legacy quarterfinals	W 54–51	5–1	19 – Filipowski	14 – Filipowski	4 – Roach	Veterans Memorial Coliseum; Portland, OR
November 25, 2022*; 3:30 p.m., ESPN	No. 8	vs. Xavier; Phil Knight Legacy semifinals	W 71–64	6–1	21 – Roach	6 – Young	5 – Roach	Moda Center; Portland, OR
November 27, 2022*; 3:30 p.m., ABC	No. 8	vs. No. 24 Purdue; Phil Knight Legacy championship	L 56–75	6–2	16 – Proctor	5 – Tied	3 – Proctor	Moda Center (7,168); Portland, OR
November 30, 2022*; 7:15 p.m., ESPN	No. 17	No. 25 Ohio State; ACC–Big Ten Challenge	W 81–72	7–2	16 – Filipowski	7 – Filipowski	5 – Roach	Cameron Indoor Stadium (9,314); Durham, NC
December 3, 2022; 4:00 p.m., ACCN	No. 17	Boston College	W 75–59	8–2 (1–0)	15 – Mitchell	10 – Filipowski	5 – Blakes	Cameron Indoor Stadium (9,314); Durham, NC
December 6, 2022*; 9:30 p.m., ESPN	No. 15	vs. Iowa; Jimmy V Classic	W 74–62	9–2	22 – Roach	10 – Filipowski	3 – Tied	Madison Square Garden (17,828); New York, NY
December 10, 2022*; 5:30 p.m., ACCN	No. 15	Maryland Eastern Shore	W 82–55	10–2	15 – Whitehead	9 – Lively II	3 – Grandison	Cameron Indoor Stadium (9,314); Durham, NC
December 20, 2022; 6:30 p.m., ACCN	No. 14	at Wake Forest	L 70–81	10–3 (1–1)	17 – Blakes	9 – Young	3 – Tied	LJVM Coliseum (10,812); Winston-Salem, NC
December 31, 2022; 1:00 p.m., ESPN2	No. 17	Florida State	W 86–67	11–3 (2–1)	20 – Young	12 – Young	3 – Blakes	Cameron Indoor Stadium (9,314); Durham, NC
January 4, 2023; 7:00 p.m., ACCN	No. 16	at NC State	L 60–84	11–4 (2–2)	14 – Filipowski	8 – Filipowski	3 – Mitchell	PNC Arena (15,188); Raleigh, NC
January 7, 2023; 1:00 p.m., ACCN	No. 16	at Boston College	W 65–64	12–4 (3–2)	18 – Whitehead	8 – Filipowski	5 – Young	Conte Forum (7,000); Chestnut Hill, MA
January 11, 2023; 7:00 p.m., ACCN	No. 24	Pittsburgh	W 77–69	13–4 (4–2)	28 – Filipowski	15 – Filipowski	5 – Proctor	Cameron Indoor Stadium (9,314); Durham, NC
January 14, 2023; 5:00 p.m., ACCN	No. 24	at Clemson	L 64–72	13–5 (4–3)	18 – Filipowski	14 – Filipowski	2 – Tied	Littlejohn Coliseum (9,000); Clemson, SC
January 21, 2023; 12:00 p.m., ESPN		No. 17 Miami (FL)	W 68–66	14–5 (5–3)	17 – Flipowski	14 – Flipowski	6 – Grandison	Cameron Indoor Stadium (9,314); Durham, NC
January 23, 2023; 7:00 p.m., ESPN		at Virginia Tech	L 75–78	14–6 (5–4)	29 – Filipowski	10 – Filipowski	6 – Proctor	Cassell Coliseum (8,925); Blacksburg, VA
January 28, 2023; 3:00 p.m., ACCN		at Georgia Tech	W 86–43	15–6 (6–4)	18 – Filipowski	10 – Lively II	8 – Proctor	McCamish Pavilion (7,382); Atlanta, GA
January 31, 2023; 7:00 p.m., ESPN		Wake Forest	W 75–73	16–6 (7–4)	21 – Roach	11 – Filipowski	3 – Lively II	Cameron Indoor Stadium (9,314); Durham, NC
February 4, 2023; 6:30 p.m., ESPN		North Carolina; Rivalry	W 63–57	17–6 (8–4)	20 – Roach	14 – Lively II	5 – Proctor	Cameron Indoor Stadium (9,314); Durham, NC
February 6, 2023; 7:00 p.m., ESPN		at No. 19 Miami (FL)	L 59–81	17–7 (8–5)	11 – Tied	9 – Filipowski	4 – Tied	Watsco Center (7,972); Coral Gables, FL
February 11, 2023; 4:00 p.m., ESPN		at No. 8 Virginia	L 62–69 ^{OT}	17–8 (8–6)	16 – Roach	11 – Young	4 – Proctor	John Paul Jones Arena (14,629); Charlottesville, VA
February 14, 2023; 7:00 p.m., ESPN		Notre Dame	W 68–64	18–8 (9–6)	22 – Filipowski	8 – Young	4 – Tied	Cameron Indoor Stadium (9,314); Durham, NC
February 18, 2023; 6:00 p.m., ESPN		at Syracuse	W 77–55	19–8 (10–6)	17 – Roach	12 – Filipowski	6 – Proctor	JMA Wireless Dome (31,063); Syracuse, NY
February 20, 2023; 7:00 p.m., ESPN		Louisville	W 79–62	20–8 (11–6)	14 – Roach	7 – Filipowski	6 – Roach	Cameron Indoor Stadium (9,314); Durham, NC
February 25, 2023; 6:00 p.m., ESPN		Virginia Tech	W 81–65	21–8 (12–6)	19 – Roach	8 – Mitchell	11 – Roach	Cameron Indoor Stadium (9,314); Durham, NC
February 28, 2023; 7:00 p.m., ESPN		NC State	W 71–67	22–8 (13–6)	20 – Roach	14 – Filipowski	2 – Tied	Cameron Indoor Stadium (9,314); Durham, NC
March 4, 2023; 6:30 p.m., ESPN		at North Carolina; Rivalry	W 62–57	23–8 (14–6)	22 – Filipowski	13 – Filipowski	3 – Proctor	Dean Smith Center (21,750); Chapel Hill, NC
ACC tournament
March 9, 2023; 2:30 p.m., ESPN2	(4) No. 21	vs. (5) Pittsburgh; Quarterfinals	W 96–69	24–8	22 – Filipowski	5 – Mitchell	10 – Proctor	Greensboro Coliseum (13,920); Greensboro, NC
March 10, 2023; 7:00 p.m., ESPN2	(4) No. 21	vs. (1) No. 14 Miami (FL); Semifinals	W 85–78	25–8	17 – Filipowski	11 – Filipowski	5 – Tied	Greensboro Coliseum; Greensboro, NC
March 11, 2023; 8:30 p.m., ESPN	(4) No. 21	vs. (2) No. 13 Virginia; Championship	W 59–49	26–8	23 – Roach	10 – Filipowski	3 – Tied	Greensboro Coliseum (19,116); Greensboro, NC
NCAA tournament
March 16, 2023; 7:10 p.m., CBS	(5 E) No. 12	vs. (12 E) Oral Roberts; First Round	W 74–51	27–8	23 – Roach	12 – Lively II	3 – Tied	Amway Center (18,018); Orlando, FL
March 18, 2023; 2:40 p.m., CBS	(5 E) No. 12	vs. (4 E) No. 20 Tennessee; Second Round	L 52–65	27–9	16 – Proctor	11 – Lively II	6 – Proctor	Amway Center (18,567); Orlando, FL
*Non-conference game. ^{#}Rankings from AP Poll. (#) Tournament seedings in parentheses. E=East. All times are in Eastern Time.

== Rankings ==
Ranking movements Legend: ██ Increase in ranking ██ Decrease in ranking — = Not ranked RV = Received votes т = Tied with team above or below
	Week																			
Poll	Pre	1	2	3	4	5	6	7	8	9	10	11	12	13	14	15	16	17	18	Final
AP	7	7	8	17	15	12	14	17	16	24	RV	RV	RV	RV	—	RV	RV	21	12	Not released
Coaches	8	8	10	16	15	12	14	14	14	21	RV	25	RV	24т	RV	RV	RV	21	16	18

*AP does not release post-NCAA Tournament rankings.
