= 2022 McDonald's All-American Boys Game =

American high school basketball game

West	East
81	105
	1st half	2nd half	Total
West	38	43	81
East	58	47	105
- Date: March 29, 2022
- Venue: Wintrust Arena, Chicago, Illinois
- MVP: Dariq Whitehead
- Network: ESPN
- Announcers: Ted Emrich, Cory Alexander, Paul Biancardi

McDonald's All-American

The 2022 McDonald's All-American Boys Game was an all-star basketball game that was played on March 29, 2022, at Wintrust Arena in Chicago, Illinois. The game's rosters featured the best and most highly recruited high school boys graduating in the class of 2022. The game was the 45th annual version of the McDonald's All-American Game first played in 1977. Due to the impact of the COVID-19 pandemic, the game had not been held since 2019. The 24 players were selected from over 700 nominees by a committee of basketball experts. They were chosen not only for their on-court skills, but for their performances off the court as well. Dariq Whitehead of the East had 13 points, seven rebounds and seven assists, and was named the game's most valuable player (MVP).

== Rosters ==
The roster was announced on January 25, 2022. Arkansas, Duke, and Kansas had the most selections with three each, while Alabama, Kentucky, Texas, and UCLA had two each. At the announcement of roster selections, only 14 schools were represented and two players were uncommitted. On March 28, 2022, Black committed to Arkansas.

=== Team East ===
ESPN 100 Rank	Name	Height (ft–in)	Weight (lb)	Position	Hometown	High school	College choice
15	Jaden Bradley	6–3	185	PG	Rochester, New York	IMG Academy	Alabama
1	Dereck Lively II	7–1	220	C	Philadelphia, Pennsylvania	Westtown School	Duke
12	Chris Livingston	6–6	200	SF	Akron, Ohio	Oak Hill Academy	Kentucky
18	Brandon Miller	6–8	200	SF	Antioch, Tennessee	Cane Ridge High School	Alabama
7	Dillon Mitchell	6–7	200	SF	Tampa, Florida	Montverde Academy	Texas
11	Julian Phillips	6–8	200	SF	Blythewood, South Carolina	Link Academy	Tennessee
19	M. J. Rice	6–5	225	SF	Henderson, North Carolina	Prolific Prep	Kansas
17	JJ Starling	6–3	170	SG	Baldwinsville, New York	La Lumiere School	Notre Dame
23	Ernest Udeh Jr.	6–10	230	C	Orlando, Florida	Dr. Phillips High School	Kansas
9	Jarace Walker	6–8	220	PF	New Freedom, Pennsylvania	IMG Academy	Houston
4	Dariq Whitehead	6–6	190	SF	Newark, New Jersey	Montverde Academy	Duke
29	Cam Whitmore	6–6	200	SF	Odenton, Maryland	Archbishop Spalding High School	Villanova

=== Team West ===
ESPN 100 Rank	Name	Height (ft–in)	Weight (lb)	Position	Hometown	High school	College choice
2	Amari Bailey	6–5	190	SG	Chicago, Illinois	Sierra Canyon School	UCLA
20	Anthony Black	6–7	185	PG	Duncanville, Texas	Duncanville High School	Arkansas^
13	Adem Bona	6–10	225	C	Ebonyi, Nigeria	Prolific Prep	UCLA
8	Gradey Dick	6–7	200	SF	Wichita, Kansas	Sunrise Christian Academy	Kansas
3	Keyonte George	6–4	185	SG	Lewisville, Texas	IMG Academy	Baylor
31	Mark Mitchell	6–8	215	PF	Kansas City, Kansas	Sunrise Christian Academy	Duke
22	Arterio Morris	6–3	190	PG	Dallas, Texas	Justin F. Kimball High School	Texas
6	Nick Smith Jr.	6–4	185	SG	Jacksonville, Arkansas	North Little Rock High School	Arkansas
14	Cason Wallace	6–4	185	SG	Dallas, Texas	Richardson High School	Kentucky
10	Jordan Walsh	6–7	190	SF	DeSoto, Texas	Link Academy	Arkansas
16	Kel'el Ware	7–0	210	C	North Little Rock, Arkansas	North Little Rock High School	Oregon
38	Kijani Wright	6–9	235	PF	Los Angeles, California	Sierra Canyon School	USC

^undecided at the time of roster selection
~undecided at game time

== Box score ==
ESPN

March 29, 2022
09:30 pm ET

East	105–81	West
Scoring by half: 58–38, 47–43
Pts: Cam Whitmore (19); Rebs: Cam Whitmore (8); Asts: Dariq Whitehead (8)		Pts: Mark Mitchell (19); Rebs: Kel'el Ware (10); Asts: Cason Wallace (6)

Wintrust Arena, Chicago, IL
