= Mark Mitchell (basketball) =

American basketball player (born 2003)

No. 25 – Missouri Tigers
- Position: Small forward / power forward
- League: Southeastern Conference

Personal information
- Born: September 1, 2003 (age 23) Kansas City, Kansas, U.S.
- Listed height: 6 ft 9 in (2.06 m)
- Listed weight: 230 lb (104 kg)

Career information
- High school: Bishop Miege (Roeland Park, Kansas); Sunrise Christian Academy (Bel Aire, Kansas)
- College: Duke (2022–2024); Missouri (2024–present)

Career highlights
- Second-team All-SEC (2026); Third-team All-SEC (2025); McDonald's All-American (2022)

Mark Mitchell Jr. (born September 1, 2003) is an American college basketball player for the Missouri Tigers of the Southeastern Conference (SEC). He previously played for the Duke Blue Devils.

== Early life ==
Mitchell grew up in Kansas City, Kansas and initially attended Bishop Miege High School. He averaged 21.6 points, 8.7 rebounds, 2.7 assists, and 1.8 blocks per game as a sophomore. Mitchell won the DiRenna Award as the top player in the Kansas City area after averaging 18 points and six rebounds per game as Bishop Miege won the Kansas Class 4A state championship. He transferred to Sunrise Christian Academy in Bel Aire, Kansas for his senior year. Mitchell averaged 17.6 points with 6.3 rebounds per game that season. He played in the 2022 McDonald's All-American Boys Game and tied as the game's leading scorer with 19 points. Mitchell was also named a second-team All-American by Sports Illustrated as a senior.

=== Recruiting ===
Mitchell was rated a five-star recruit by Rivals and 247Sports and a four-star recruit by ESPN. On December 10, 2021, Mitchell committed to playing college basketball for Duke while considering offers from Kansas, Missouri, and UCLA.

College recruiting
Name	Hometown	School	Height	Weight	Commit date
Mark Mitchell; PF	Kansas City, KS	Sunrise Christian Academy (KS)	6 ft 8 in (2.03 m)	215 lb (98 kg)	Dec 10, 2021
Mark Mitchell; PF	Recruit ratings: Rivals: 247Sports: ESPN: (89)				
Overall recruit ranking: Rivals: 21 247Sports: 13 ESPN: 28
Note: In many cases, Scout, Rivals, 247Sports, On3, and ESPN may conflict in their listings of height and weight.; In these cases, the average was taken. ESPN grades are on a 100-point scale.; Sources: "Duke 2022 Basketball Commitments". Rivals.; "2022 Duke Blue Devils Recruiting Class". ESPN.; "2022 Team Ranking". Rivals.

== College career ==
=== Duke ===
Mitchell entered his freshman season at Duke as a starter at forward. He started 35 games and averaged 9.1 points per game and 4.5 rebounds per game while shooting 46.9% from the field during his freshman season. In Mitchell’s sophomore year, he started 32 games out of 33 games played and averaged 11.6 points per game and 6 rebounds per game while shooting 54% from the field.

=== Mizzou ===
On April 9, 2024, Mitchell entered the transfer portal. Mitchell committed to the Missouri Tigers on April 19, 2024. On February 19, 2025, Mitchell scored a career-high 31 points against then No. 4 Alabama as Mizzou won their 20th game of the 2024-2025 season. After leading the team in scoring during the 2024-2025 regular season, Mitchell was named Third-team all-SEC. He averaged 18.3 points, 5.2 rebounds, and 3.6 assists per game as a senior.

In August 2026, Mitchell was granted a temporary restraining order against the NCAA and as a result granted a fifth season of eligibility after filing a lawsuit in the state of Kentucky. He first committed to play his final season at the University of Kentucky. On August 31, Mitchell de-committed from Kentucky and re-enrolled at Missouri in order to avoid a legal battle with the SEC in regards to transferring within the conference after the allotted spring window.

== Professional career ==
Mitchell automatically was entered in the 2026 NBA draft after his senior season, not formally declaring, and went unselected. After which he played with the Denver Nuggets in the 2026 NBA Summer League, though he did not sign a contract in the NBA.

== Career statistics ==
Legend
GP	Games played	GS	Games started	MPG	Minutes per game
FG%	Field goal percentage	3P%	3-point field goal percentage	FT%	Free throw percentage
RPG	Rebounds per game	APG	Assists per game	SPG	Steals per game
BPG	Blocks per game	PPG	Points per game	**Bold**	Career high

=== College ===
Year	Team	GP	GS	MPG	FG%	3P%	FT%	RPG	APG	SPG	BPG	PPG
2022–23	Duke	**35**	**35**	27.1	.469	.352	**.763**	4.5	1.2	0.6	0.5	9.1
2023–24	Duke	33	32	28.6	.540	.275	.623	**6.0**	1.1	0.8	0.7	11.6
2024–25	Missouri	33	33	27.8	.505	.260	.670	4.7	1.9	**1.0**	**0.8**	13.9
2025–26	Missouri	33	33	**33.8**	**.547**	**.388**	.669	5.2	**3.6**	0.7	0.5	**18.3**
**Career**		**134**	**133**	**29.3**	**.518**	**.321**	**.671**	**5.1**	**1.9**	**0.8**	**0.6**	**13.2**
