= Dereck Lively II =

American basketball player (born 2004)

No. 2 – Dallas Mavericks
- Position: Center
- League: NBA

Personal information
- Born: February 12, 2004 (age 22) Philadelphia, Pennsylvania, U.S.
- Listed height: 7 ft 1 in (2.16 m)
- Listed weight: 230 lb (104 kg)

Career information
- High school: Westtown School (West Chester, Pennsylvania)
- College: Duke (2022–2023)
- NBA draft: 2023: 1st round, 12th overall pick
- Drafted by: Oklahoma City Thunder
- Playing career: 2023–present

Career history
- 2023–present: Dallas Mavericks

Career highlights
- NBA All-Rookie Second Team (2024); ACC All-Defensive team (2023); ACC All-Freshman team (2023); Morgan Wootten National Player of the Year (2022); McDonald's All-American (2022); Mr. Pennsylvania Basketball (2022)
- Stats at NBA.com
- Stats at Basketball Reference

Dereck Jerome Lively II (born February 12, 2004) is an American professional basketball player for the Dallas Mavericks of the National Basketball Association (NBA). He played college basketball for the Duke Blue Devils. He was a consensus five-star recruit and one of the top players in the 2022 class.

== Early life ==
Lively was born on February 12, 2004, in Philadelphia, Pennsylvania, to a Philadelphia-born father, chef Dereck Lively and mother Southfield, Michigan-born Kathy Phillips Drysdale, a former Penn State basketball star. Drysdale, who holds the college's record for consecutive field goals made and ranks in the top-20 in Penn State history in rebounds and blocks, worked for the Philadelphia 76ers in their entertainment division and then served as the Penn State women’s basketball marketing manager. She died in 2024 from Hodgkin’s Lymphoma. Lively’s father battled drug addiction for years and died in 2012 from an overdose.

== High school career ==
Lively attended Westtown School in West Chester, Pennsylvania, leading Westtown to a 31–7 record and the Pennsylvania Independent Schools Athletic Association state championship in 2022. Defeating Perkiomen School led by Ryan Dunn and Xaivian Lee. As a senior, he averaged 14.0 points, 14.0 rebounds and 4.5 blocks per game. He was selected to play in the 2022 McDonald's All-American Boys Game.

=== Recruiting ===
Lively was a consensus five-star recruit and one of the top players in the 2022 class, according to major recruiting services. On September 20, 2021, he committed to playing college basketball for Duke over offers from Kentucky, Michigan and Penn State.

College recruiting
| Name | Hometown | School | Height | Weight | Commit date |
|---|---|---|---|---|---|
| Dereck Lively II; C | Philadelphia, PA | Westtown School (PA) | 7 ft 1 in (2.16 m) | 220 lb (100 kg) | Sep 20, 2021 |
| Dereck Lively II; C | Recruit ratings: Rivals: 247Sports: ESPN: (94) | | | | |
Overall recruit ranking: Rivals: 3 247Sports: 2 ESPN: 1
Note: In many cases, Scout, Rivals, 247Sports, On3, and ESPN may conflict in their listings of height and weight.; In these cases, the average was taken. ESPN grades are on a 100-point scale.; Sources: "Duke 2022 Basketball Commitments". Rivals.; "2022 Duke Blue Devils Recruiting Class". ESPN.; "2022 Team Ranking". Rivals.

== College career ==
Before the start of the 2022–23 season, Lively was named to the Naismith and Kareem Abdul-Jabbar Award preseason watchlists. As a freshman at Duke, he averaged 5.2 points, 5.4 rebounds and 2.4 blocks per game. Lively was named to both ACC All-Freshman and Defensive teams.

On April 4, 2023, Lively declared for the 2023 NBA draft, forgoing his remaining college eligibility.

== Professional career ==
The Oklahoma City Thunder selected Lively 12th overall in the 2023 NBA draft and then traded him to the Dallas Mavericks, with whom he signed on July 8, 2023. On October 25, Lively made his NBA regular-season debut, putting up 16 points, 10 rebounds, one block, and one steal in a 126–119 win against the San Antonio Spurs. He was named to the NBA All-Rookie Team second team. Lively ended his rookie season by reaching the 2024 NBA Finals where the Mavericks lost to the Boston Celtics in five games.

Lively played in 32 games (25 starts) for the Mavericks to begin the 2024–25 Dallas Mavericks season, averaging 9.1 points, 7.8 rebounds, and 2.6 assists. On January 22, 2025, Lively was ruled out for 2-to-3 months after suffering a stress fracture in his right ankle. On December 10, Lively suffered another major injury setback. He would have to undergo a season-ending procedure on his right foot to address lingering discomfort.

== Career statistics ==
Legend
| GP | Games played | GS | Games started | MPG | Minutes per game |
| FG% | Field goal percentage | 3P% | 3-point field goal percentage | FT% | Free throw percentage |
| RPG | Rebounds per game | APG | Assists per game | SPG | Steals per game |
| BPG | Blocks per game | PPG | Points per game | **Bold** | Career high |

=== NBA ===
==== Regular season ====
| Year | Team | GP | GS | MPG | FG% | 3P% | FT% | RPG | APG | SPG | BPG | PPG |
|---|---|---|---|---|---|---|---|---|---|---|---|---|
| 2023–24 | Dallas | **55** | **42** | **23.5** | **.747** | .000 | .506 | 6.9 | 1.1 | **.7** | 1.4 | **8.8** |
| 2024–25 | Dallas | 36 | 29 | 23.1 | .702 | — | .630 | **7.5** | **2.4** | .6 | **1.6** | 8.7 |
| 2025–26 | Dallas | 7 | 4 | 16.4 | .611 | — | **.800** | 5.3 | 1.9 | .6 | **1.6** | 4.3 |
| Career | | 98 | 75 | 22.9 | .725 | .000 | .579 | 7.0 | 1.6 | .6 | 1.5 | 8.4 |

==== Playoffs ====
| Year | Team | GP | GS | MPG | FG% | 3P% | FT% | RPG | APG | SPG | BPG | PPG |
|---|---|---|---|---|---|---|---|---|---|---|---|---|
| 2024 | Dallas | 21 | 0 | 22.0 | .674 | 1.000 | .590 | 7.4 | 1.3 | .4 | 1.0 | 7.9 |
| Career | | 21 | 0 | 22.0 | .674 | 1.000 | .590 | 7.4 | 1.3 | .4 | 1.0 | 7.9 |

=== College ===
| Year | Team | GP | GS | MPG | FG% | 3P% | FT% | RPG | APG | SPG | BPG | PPG |
|---|---|---|---|---|---|---|---|---|---|---|---|---|
| 2022–23 | Duke | 32 | 25 | 19.8 | .658 | .154 | .600 | 5.0 | 1.1 | .5 | 2.3 | 5.4 |
| Career | | 32 | 25 | 19.8 | .658 | .154 | .600 | 5.0 | 1.1 | .5 | 2.3 | 5.4 |
