= 2024 ACC men's basketball tournament =

American college basketball competition

- 2024 ACC Tournament logo
- Classification: Division I
- Season: 2023–24
- Teams: 15
- Site: Capital One Arena; Washington, D.C.
- Champions: NC State (11th title)
- Winning coach: Kevin Keatts (1st title)
- MVP: D. J. Burns (NC State)
- Attendance: 101,375 (total); 19,218 (championship)
- Television: ESPN, ESPN2, ESPNU, ACCN

2023–24 ACC men's basketball standings
	Conf.				Overall
Team	W		L	PCT	W		L	PCT
No. 7 North Carolina	17	–	3	.850	29	–	8	.784
No. 9 Duke	15	–	5	.750	27	–	9	.750
Virginia	13	–	7	.650	23	–	11	.676
Pittsburgh	12	–	8	.600	22	–	11	.667
Wake Forest	11	–	9	.550	21	–	14	.600
No. 14 Clemson	11	–	9	.550	24	–	12	.667
Syracuse	11	–	9	.550	20	–	12	.625
Virginia Tech	10	–	10	.500	19	–	15	.559
Florida State	10	–	10	.500	17	–	16	.515
No. 10 NC State †	9	–	11	.450	26	–	15	.634
Boston College	8	–	12	.400	20	–	16	.556
Notre Dame	7	–	13	.350	13	–	20	.394
Georgia Tech	7	–	13	.350	14	–	18	.438
Miami (FL)	6	–	14	.300	15	–	17	.469
Louisville	3	–	17	.150	8	–	24	.250
† 2024 ACC tournament winner Rankings from AP Poll

The 2024 ACC men's basketball tournament was the postseason men's basketball tournament for the Atlantic Coast Conference held at the Capital One Arena in Washington, D.C., from March 12 to 16, 2024. It was the 71st annual edition of the tournament. The NC State Wolfpack won the title as the tenth seed, winning five games in five days to become tournament champions. They were the lowest seed to win the tournament and the first team to win five games in five days since UConn accomplished the feat to win the 2011 Big East Tournament. As champions, NC State earned the ACC's automatic bid to the 2024 NCAA tournament.

== Seeds ==
All 15 ACC teams participated in the tournament. Teams were seeded by record within the conference, with a tiebreaker system to seed teams with identical conference records.

Seed	School	Conference Record	Tiebreakers
1	North Carolina	17–3	
2	Duke	15–5	
3	Virginia	13–7	
4	Pittsburgh	12–8	
5	Wake Forest	11–9	2–0 vs. Clemson and Syracuse
6	Clemson	11–9	2–1 vs. Syracuse and Wake Forest
7	Syracuse	11–9	0–3 vs. Clemson and Wake Forest
8	Virginia Tech	10–10	1–1 vs. Florida State; 1–1 vs. Virginia
9	Florida State	10–10	1–1 vs. Virginia Tech; 0–1 vs. Virginia
10	NC State	9–11	
11	Boston College	8–12	
12	Notre Dame	7–13	2–0 vs. Georgia Tech
13	Georgia Tech	7–13	0–2 vs. Notre Dame
14	Miami	6–14	
15	Louisville	3–17	

== Schedule ==
Session	Game	Time	Matchup	Score	Television	Attendance
First round – Tuesday, March 12
Opening day	1	2:00 p.m.	No. 12 Notre Dame vs. No. 13 Georgia Tech	84–80	ACCN	7,523
Opening day	2	4:30 p.m.	No. 10 NC State vs. No. 15 Louisville	94–85	ACCN	7,523
Opening day	3	7:00 p.m.	No. 11 Boston College vs. No. 14 Miami	81–65	ACCN	7,523
Second round – Wednesday, March 13
1	4	noon	No. 8 Virginia Tech vs. No. 9 Florida State	76–86	ESPN	9,920
1	5	2:30 p.m.	No. 5 Wake Forest vs. No. 12 Notre Dame	72–59	ESPN	9,920
2	6	7:00 p.m.	No. 7 Syracuse vs. No. 10 NC State	65–83	ESPN2	13,445
2	7	9:30 p.m.	No. 6 Clemson vs. No. 11 Boston College	55–76	ESPNU	13,445
Quarterfinals – Thursday, March 14
3	8	noon	No. 1 North Carolina vs. No. 9 Florida State	92–67	ESPN	14,920
3	9	2:30 p.m.	No. 4 Pittsburgh vs. No. 5 Wake Forest	81−69	ESPN2	14,920
4	10	7:00 p.m.	No. 2 Duke vs. No. 10 NC State	69−74	ESPN	17,627
4	11	9:30 p.m.	No. 3 Virginia vs. No. 11 Boston College	66−60^{OT}	ESPN	17,627
Semifinals – Friday, March 15
5	12	7:00 p.m.	No. 1 North Carolina vs. No. 4 Pittsburgh	72–65	ESPN	18,722
5	13	9:30 p.m.	No. 3 Virginia vs. No. 10 NC State	65–73^{OT}	ESPN2	18,722
Championship – Saturday, March 16
6	14	8:30 p.m.	No. 1 North Carolina vs. No. 10 NC State	76–84	ESPN	19,218
Game times in EDT. Rankings denote tournament seed.

== Bracket ==
First round Tuesday, March 12
12	Notre Dame	84
13	Georgia Tech	80
10	NC State	94
15	Louisville	85
11	Boston College	81
14	Miami	65

Second round Wednesday, March 13
8	Virginia Tech	76
9	Florida State	86
5	Wake Forest	72
12	Notre Dame	59
7	Syracuse	65
10	NC State	83
6	Clemson	55
11	Boston College	76

Quarterfinals; Thursday, March 14
1	North Carolina	92
9	Florida State	67
4	Pittsburgh	81
5	Wake Forest	69
2	Duke	69
10	NC State	74
3	Virginia	66^{OT}
11	Boston College	60

Semifinals; Friday, March 15
1	North Carolina	72
4	Pittsburgh	65
10	NC State	73^{OT}
3	Virginia	65

Championship; Saturday, March 16
1	North Carolina	76
10	NC State	84

== Game summaries ==
=== First round ===
ACCN

March 12
2:00 p.m.

Report

No. 12 Notre Dame 84, No. 13 Georgia Tech 80
Scoring by half: 45−35, 39−45
Pts: Braeden Shrewsberry, 23; Rebs: Kebba Njie, 9 Asts: Markus Burton, 8	Pts: Naithan George, 24; Rebs: Baye Ndongo, 7 Asts: Naithan George, 7

Capital One Arena
Washington, D.C.
Attendance: 7,523
Referees: Bert Smith
Raymie Styons
Jemel Spearman

ACCN

March 12
4:30 p.m.

Report

No. 10 NC State 94, No. 15 Louisville 85
Scoring by half: 45−46, 49−39
Pts: Casey Morsell, 25; Rebs: Jayden Taylor, 8 Asts: tied, 3	Pts: Skyy Clark, 36; Rebs: Brandon Huntley-Hatfield, 7 Asts: Brandon Huntley-Hatfield, 4

Capital One Arena
Washington, D.C.
Attendance: 7,523
Referees: Lee Cassell
Mark Schnur
Jerry Heater

ACCN

March 12
7:00 p.m.

Report

No. 11 Boston College 81, No. 14 Miami 65
Scoring by half: 47–32, 34–33
Pts: Quinten Post (30); Rebs: Quinten Post (13); Asts: tied (3)	Pts: tied (18); Rebs: Norchad Omier (13); Asts: Bensley Joseph (4)

Capital One Arena
Washington, D.C.
Attendance: 7,523
Referees: Ted Valentine
Tommy Morrissey
Justin Porterfield

=== Second round ===
ESPN

March 13
12:00 p.m.

Report

No. 8 Virginia Tech 76, No. 9 Florida State 86
Scoring by half: 37−36, 39−48
Pts: Sean Pedulla, 24; Rebs: Tyler Nickel, 7 Asts: Sean Pedulla, 5	Pts: Jamir Watkins, 34; Rebs: Jamir Watkins, 11; Asts: Jalen Warley, 4

Capital One Arena
Washington, D.C.
Attendance: 9,920
Referees: Jamie Luckie
A.J. Desai
Jerry Heater

ESPN

March 13
2:30 p.m.

Report

No. 5 Wake Forest 72, No. 12 Notre Dame 59
Scoring by half: 40−34, 32−25
Pts: Kevin Miller, 17; Rebs: Andrew Carr, 11; Asts: Efton Reid III, 5	Pts: Markus Burton, 21; Rebs: Carey Booth/Kebba Njie, 6 Asts: Markus Burton, 3

Capital One Arena
Washington, D.C.
Attendance: 9,920
Referees: Ron Groover
Tommy Morrissey
Justin Porterfield

ESPN2

March 13
7:00 p.m.

Report

No. 7 Syracuse 65, No. 10 NC State 83
Scoring by half: 32–35, 33–48
Pts: Judah Mintz (21); Rebs: Maliq Brown (11); Asts: Quadir Copeland/Judah Mintz (4)	Pts: Jayden Taylor (18); Rebs: Mohamed Diarra (14); Asts: Mohamed Diarra (6)

Capital One Arena
Washington, D.C.
Attendance: 13,445
Referees: Roger Ayers
Tony Henderson
Jemel Spearman

ESPNU

March 13
9:30 p.m.

Report

No. 6 Clemson 55, No. 11 Boston College 76
Scoring by half: 28–40, 27–36
Pts: PJ Hall (21); Rebs: Joseph Girard III (7); Asts: Ian Schieffelin (4)	Pts: Claudell Harris Jr. (27); Rebs: Quinten Post (8); Asts: Quinten Post (7)

Capital One Arena
Washington, D.C.
Attendance: 13,445
Referees: Bill Covington
Clarence Armstrong
Mark Schnur

=== Quarterfinals ===
ESPN

March 14
12:00 p.m.

Report

No. 1 North Carolina 92, No. 9 Florida State 67
Scoring by half: 46−30, 46−37
Pts: R. J. Davis, 18; Rebs: Armando Bacot/Harrison Ingram, 10; Asts: Elliot Cadeau, 6	Pts: Primo Spears, 17; Rebs: Baba Miller/Jamir Watkins, 4 Asts: Jamir Watkins, 5

Capital One Arena
Washington, D.C.
Attendance: 14,920
Referees: Lee Cassell
Tommy Morrissey
A.J. Desai

ESPN2

March 14
2:30 p.m.

Report

No. 4 Pittsburgh 81, No. 5 Wake Forest 69
Scoring by half: 38–26, 43–43
Pts: Ishmael Leggett, 30; Rebs: Ishmael Leggett, 7 Asts: Jaland Lowe, 5	Pts: Cameron Hildreth, 23; Rebs: Andrew Carr, 9 Asts: Hunter Sallis, 4

Capital One Arena
Washington, D.C.
Attendance: 14,920
Referees: Roger Ayers
Bert Smith
Tony Henderson

ESPN

March 14
7:00 p.m.

Report

No. 2 Duke 69, No. 10 NC State 74
Scoring by half: 32–35, 37–39
Pts: Kyle Filipowski, 28; Rebs: Kyle Filipowski, 14; Asts: Tyrese Proctor, 5	Pts: DJ Horne, 18; Rebs: Mohamed Diarra, 16; Asts: D. J. Burns/Michael O'Connell, 4

Capital One Arena
Washington, D.C.
Attendance: 17,627
Referees: Ron Groover
Bill Covington
Clarence Armstrong

ESPN

March 14
9:30 p.m.

Report

No. 3 Virginia 66, No. 11 Boston College 60 (OT)
Scoring by half: 29–35, 28–22 Overtime: 3–9
Pts: Jacob Groves, 15; Rebs: Jacob Groves, 11; Asts: Reece Beekman, 11	Pts: Quinten Post, 23; Rebs: Quinten Post, 13; Asts: Jaeden Zackery, 5

Capital One Arena
Washington, D.C.
Attendance: 17,627
Referees: Ted Valentine
Jamie Luckie
Raymie Styons

=== Semifinals ===
ESPN

March 15
7:00 p.m.

Report

No. 1 North Carolina 72, No. 4 Pittsburgh 65
Scoring by half: 33−35, 39−30
Pts: R. J. Davis (25); Rebs: Armando Bacot (11); Asts: Seth Trimble (4)	Pts: Bub Carrington (24); Rebs: Guillermo Diaz Graham (7); Asts: Jaland Lowe (4)

Capital One Arena
Washington, D.C.
Attendance: 18,722
Referees: Ted Valentine
Ron Groover
Mark Schnur

ESPN2

March 15
9:30 p.m.

Report

No. 3 Virginia 65, No. 10 NC State 73 (OT)
Scoring by half: 29–29, 29–29 Overtime: 7–15
Pts: Isaac McKneely (23); Rebs: Ryan Dunn/Jordan Minor (9); Asts: Reece Beekman (11)	Pts: D. J. Burns (19); Rebs: Mohamed Diarra (12); Asts: Michael O'Connell (3)

Capital One Arena
Washington, D.C.
Attendance: 18,722
Referees: Roger Ayers
A.J. Desai
Tony Henderson

=== Final ===
ESPN

March 16
8:30 p.m.

Report

No. 1 North Carolina 76, No. 10 NC State 84
Scoring by half: 40–39, 36–45
Pts: R. J. Davis (30); Rebs: Armando Bacot (12); Asts: Elliot Cadeau (8)	Pts: DJ Horne (29); Rebs: Mohamed Diarra (14); Asts: D. J. Burns (7)

Capital One Arena
Washington, D.C.
Attendance: 19,218
Referees: Lee Cassell
Bert Smith
Bill Covington Jr.

== Awards and honors ==
2024 ACC Men's Basketball All-Tournament Teams
First Team	Second Team
D. J. Burns, NC State (MVP); D. J. Horne, NC State; Michael O'Connell, NC State; Armando Bacot, North Carolina; R. J. Davis, North Carolina	Mohamed Diarra, NC State; Bub Carrington, Pittsburgh; Ishmael Leggett, Pittsburgh; Reece Beekman, Virginia; Quinten Post, Boston College

== See also ==
- 2024 ACC women's basketball tournament
