= 2023–24 Florida State Seminoles men's basketball team =

American college basketball season

2023–24 Florida State Seminoles men's basketball

Sunshine Slam Beach champions
- Conference: Atlantic Coast Conference
- Record: 17–16 (10–10 ACC)
- Head coach: Leonard Hamilton (22nd season)
- Associate head coach: Stan Jones (22nd season)
- Assistant coaches: Steve Smith (5th season); Kevin Nickelberry (1st season)
- Home arena: Donald L. Tucker Center

2023–24 ACC men's basketball standings
	Conf.				Overall
Team	W		L	PCT	W		L	PCT
No. 7 North Carolina	17	–	3	.850	29	–	8	.784
No. 9 Duke	15	–	5	.750	27	–	9	.750
Virginia	13	–	7	.650	23	–	11	.676
Pittsburgh	12	–	8	.600	22	–	11	.667
Wake Forest	11	–	9	.550	21	–	14	.600
No. 14 Clemson	11	–	9	.550	24	–	12	.667
Syracuse	11	–	9	.550	20	–	12	.625
Virginia Tech	10	–	10	.500	19	–	15	.559
Florida State	10	–	10	.500	17	–	16	.515
No. 10 NC State †	9	–	11	.450	26	–	15	.634
Boston College	8	–	12	.400	20	–	16	.556
Notre Dame	7	–	13	.350	13	–	20	.394
Georgia Tech	7	–	13	.350	14	–	18	.438
Miami (FL)	6	–	14	.300	15	–	17	.469
Louisville	3	–	17	.150	8	–	24	.250
† 2024 ACC tournament winner Rankings from AP Poll

The 2023–24 Florida State Seminoles men's basketball team represented Florida State University during the 2023–24 NCAA Division I men's basketball season. The Seminoles were led by head coach Leonard Hamilton, in his 22nd year, and played their home games at the Donald L. Tucker Center on the university's Tallahassee, Florida campus as members of the Atlantic Coast Conference.

The Seminoles started their season 4–1, with their only loss coming in their rivalry game at Florida. The team won three games in the Sunshine Slam including winning the final in overtime against eighteenth ranked Colorado. However, after that streak, the Seminoles struggled, losing four straight games. Losses included their ACC–SEC Challenge game against Georgia, and their ACC opener against number seventeen North Carolina. They then won two of their last three non-conference games, to finish with a 6–5 non-conference record. The Seminoles won six of their next seven ACC games, with the only loss coming against Clemson. Their schedule became a tougher, and they lost five of their next six games, including losses to third-ranked North Carolina and ninth-ranked Duke. In this stretch they lost to eventual last place finishers Louisville. The end of the season was a mixed bag for the Seminoles as they finished 3–3. They again lost to Clemson, but defeated NC State and completed a season sweep of in-state opponents Miami.

The Seminoles finished the 2023–24 season 17–16 and 10–10 in ACC play to finish in a tie for eighth place. As the ninth seed in the ACC tournament, they defeated eighth seed Virginia Tech in the Second Round before losing to first seed North Carolina in the Quarterfinals. They were not invited to the NCAA tournament or the NIT. This marked the third straight season the Seminoles did not participate in post-season play.

== Previous season ==
The Seminoles finished the 2022–23 season 9–23, 7–13 in ACC play, to finish in 12th place. In the ACC Tournament, they lost to Georgia Tech in the first round. Their nine overall wins were the lowest season total since 2001.

== Offseason ==
=== Departures ===
Florida State Departures
Name	Number	Pos.	Height	Weight	Year	Hometown	Reason for Departure
Caleb Mills	4	G	6'5"	180	(redshirt) Junior	Arden, NC	Transferred to Memphis
Jeremiah Bembry	10	F	6'6"	185	Freshman	Brooklyn, NY	Transferred to West Virginia
Naheem McLeod	24	C	7'4"	255	Junior	Philadelphia, PA	Transferred to Syracuse
Matthew Cleveland	35	G	6'7"	200	Sophomore	Atlanta, GA	Transferred to Miami (FL)
Cleveland Yates	42	G	6'2"	214	(redshirt) Sophomore	Memphis, TN	Walk-on; left the team for personal reasons

=== Incoming transfers ===
Florida State incoming transfers
Name	Number	Pos.	Height	Weight	Year	Hometown	Previous School
Josh Nickleberry	20	G	6'4"	205	GS Senior	Fayetteville, NC	La Salle
Jason Simpson	4	G	5'10"	155	Junior	West Palm Beach, FL	Walk-on; St. John's
Primo Spears	23	G	6'3"	185	Junior	Hartford, CT	Georgetown
Jamir Watkins	2	F	6'7"	210	(redshirt) Junior	Trenton, NJ	La Salle

=== 2023 recruiting class ===
College recruiting
Name	Hometown	School	Height	Weight	Commit date
Taylor Bol Bowen #18 PF	Wolfeboro, NH	Brewster Academy	6 ft 8 in (2.03 m)	195 lb (88 kg)	Jun 25, 2022
Taylor Bol Bowen #18 PF	Recruit ratings: Rivals: 247Sports: ESPN: (83)				
Overall recruit ranking: Rivals: 6 247Sports: 5
Note: In many cases, Scout, Rivals, 247Sports, On3, and ESPN may conflict in their listings of height and weight.; In these cases, the average was taken. ESPN grades are on a 100-point scale.; Sources: "Florida State Seminoles". ESPN.; "2023 Team Ranking". Rivals.

=== 2024 Recruiting class ===
College recruiting (2024)
Name	Hometown	School	Height	Weight	Commit date
A.J. Swinton #45 SF	Arlington, VA	Bishop O'Connell High School	6 ft 5 in (1.96 m)	180 lb (82 kg)	Aug 3, 2023
A.J. Swinton #45 SF	Recruit ratings: Rivals: 247Sports: ESPN: (80)				
Overall recruit ranking: Rivals: 6 247Sports: 5
Note: In many cases, Scout, Rivals, 247Sports, On3, and ESPN may conflict in their listings of height and weight.; In these cases, the average was taken. ESPN grades are on a 100-point scale.; Sources: "Florida State Seminoles". ESPN.; "2024 Team Ranking". Rivals.

== Roster ==
2023–24 Florida State Seminoles men's basketball team
Players
Coaches

Pos.	#	Name	Height	Weight	Year	Previous school	Hometown
G	0	Chandler Jackson	6 ft 5 in (1.96 m)	220 lb (100 kg)	So	Christian Brothers	Memphis, TN
G	1	Jalen Warley	6 ft 6 in (1.98 m)	200 lb (91 kg)	Jr	Westtown School	Mount Airy, PA
F	2	Jamir Watkins	6 ft 7 in (2.01 m)	210 lb (95 kg)	RS Jr	Trenton Catholic; VCU	Trenton, NJ
F	3	Cameron Corhen	6 ft 10 in (2.08 m)	225 lb (102 kg)	So	Sunrise Christian Academy	Allen, TX
G	4	Jason Simpson (W)	5 ft 10 in (1.78 m)	155 lb (70 kg)	Jr	Montverde Academy; St. John's	West Palm Beach, FL
F	5	De'Ante Green	6 ft 9 in (2.06 m)	210 lb (95 kg)	So	Asheville Christian	Asheville, NC
F	10	Taylor Bol Bowen	6 ft 10 in (2.08 m)	195 lb (88 kg)	Fr	Brewster Academy	Jericho, VT
F	11	Baba Miller	6 ft 11 in (2.11 m)	204 lb (93 kg)	So	Real Madrid	Mallorca, Spain
F	12	Tom House	6 ft 7 in (2.01 m)	200 lb (91 kg)	So	Centerville	Dayton, OH
G	20	Josh Nickelberry	6 ft 5 in (1.96 m)	195 lb (88 kg)	GS	Northwood Temple Academy; La Salle	Fayetteville, NC
G	21	Cam'Ron Fletcher	6 ft 7 in (2.01 m)	220 lb (100 kg)	Sr	Vashon; Kentucky	St. Louis, MO
G	22	Darin Green Jr.	6 ft 5 in (1.96 m)	195 lb (88 kg)	Sr	Wharton; UCF	Charlotte, NC
G	23	Primo Spears	6 ft 3 in (1.91 m)	185 lb (84 kg)	Jr	Mount Zion Prep; Georgetown	Hartford, CT
F	33	Jaylan Gainey	6 ft 10 in (2.08 m)	230 lb (104 kg)	GS	The Academy at Smith; Brown	Greensboro, NC
F	35	Alhagie Waka Mbatch (W)	6 ft 10 in (2.08 m)	203 lb (92 kg)	Fr	KOTU Sr Secondary School	Serekunda, Gambia
G	40	Isaac Spainhour (W)	6 ft 3 in (1.91 m)	180 lb (82 kg)	RS Jr	West Stokes	King, NC
G	41	R.J. Morris (W)	6 ft 3 in (1.91 m)	185 lb (84 kg)	So	Jupiter Christian	Jupiter, FL
G	44	Max Thorpe (W)	6 ft 2 in (1.88 m)	175 lb (79 kg)	RS So	Countryside	Clearwater, FL
F	45	Michael Brown (W)	6 ft 7 in (2.01 m)	225 lb (102 kg)	Jr	Sidwell Friends	Fort Washington, MD
F	51	Sola Adebisi (W)	6 ft 6 in (1.98 m)	205 lb (93 kg)	RS Fr	Cambridge	Milton, GA

Head coach

- Leonard Hamilton (UT Martin)

Assistant coach(es)

- Stan Jones (Memphis)
- Steve Smith (Morgan State)
- Kevin Nickelberry (Virginia Wesleyan)

Legend

- (C) Team captain
- (S) Suspended
- (I) Ineligible
- (W) Walk-on
- Injured
- Current redshirt

Roster

== Schedule and results ==
Date time, TV	Rank^{#}	Opponent^{#}	Result	Record	High points	High rebounds	High assists	Site (attendance) city, state Source:
Exhibition
October 29, 2023*; 4:00 p.m.		Flagler	W 90–74	–	18 – Watkins	9 – Miller	3 – Tied	Donald L. Tucker Civic Center (–); Tallahassee, FL
November 5, 2023*; 4:00 p.m.		Valdosta State	W 90–67	–	19 – Watkins	10 – Watkins	6 – Watkins	Donald L. Tucker Civic Center (–); Tallahassee, FL
Regular season
November 10, 2023*; 6:00 p.m., ACCNX/ESPN+		Kennesaw State	W 94–67	1–0	18 – Green, Jr.	7 – Watkins	6 – Watkins	Donald L. Tucker Civic Center (6,165); Tallahassee, FL
November 13, 2023*; 7:00 p.m., ACCNX/ESPN+		Central Michigan; Sunshine Slam campus game	W 94–67	2–0	16 – Green, Jr.	6 – Tied	4 – Tied	Donald L. Tucker Civic Center (4,953); Tallahassee, FL
November 17, 2023*; 7:00 p.m., SECN		at Florida; Rivalry	L 68–89	2–1	18 – Corhen	10 – Corhen	4 – Warley	O'Connell Center (10,013); Gainesville, FL
November 20, 2023*; 5:30 p.m., CBSSN		vs. UNLV; Sunshine Slam (Beach Division) semifinal	W 83–75	3–1	19 – Watkins	6 – Fletcher	8 – Watkins	Ocean Center; Daytona Beach, FL
November 21, 2023*; 4:00 p.m., CBSSN		vs. No. 18 Colorado; Sunshine Slam (Beach Division) championship	W 77–71 ^{OT}	4–1	19 – Worley	11 – Watkins	4 – Watkins	Ocean Center; Daytona Beach, FL
November 29, 2023*; 9:15 p.m., ACCN		Georgia; ACC–SEC Challenge	L 66–68	4–2	21 – Green, Jr.	9 – Green	3 – Warley	Donald L. Tucker Civic Center (6,688); Tallahassee, FL
December 2, 2023; 2:00 p.m., ACCN		at No. 17 North Carolina	L 70–78	4–3 (0–1)	17 – Watkins	8 – Watkins	3 – Green	Dean Smith Center (20,285); Chapel Hill, NC
December 9, 2023*; 1:30 p.m., ACCN		vs. South Florida; Orange Bowl Basketball Classic	L 72–88	4–4	15 – Watkins	11 – Miller	5 – Jackson	Amerant Bank Arena; Sunrise, FL
December 16, 2023*; 8:00 p.m., ACCN		SMU	L 57–68	4–5	10 – Tied	6 – Gainey	2 – Tied	Donald L. Tucker Civic Center (4,301); Tallahassee, FL
December 19, 2023*; 8:00 p.m., ACCN		North Florida	W 91–75	5–5	24 – Green, Jr.	8 – Watkins	4 – Miller	Donald L. Tucker Civic Center (4,056); Tallahassee, FL
December 22, 2023*; 7:00 p.m, ACCNX/ESPN+		Winthrop	W 67–61	6–5	12 – Tied	6 – Tied	2 – Tied	Donald L. Tucker Civic Center (4,499); Tallahassee, FL
December 30, 2023*; 12:00 p.m., ACCNX/ESPN+		Lipscomb	L 75–78	6–6	19 – Watkins	7 – Tied	3 – Spears	Donald L. Tucker Civic Center (4,051); Tallahassee, FL
January 3, 2024; 7:00 p.m., ACCN		Georgia Tech	W 82–71	7–6 (1–1)	14 – Jackson	5 – Tied	3 – Tied	Donald L. Tucker Civic Center (4,248); Tallahassee, FL
January 6, 2024; 4:00 p.m., ACCN		Virginia Tech	W 77–74	8–6 (2–1)	11 – Tied	10 – Miller	5 – Miller	Donald L. Tucker Civic Center (5,025); Tallahassee, FL
January 9, 2024; 7:00 p.m., ACCN		Wake Forest	W 87–82	9–6 (3–1)	19 – Watkins	5 – Green, Jr.	9 – Watkins	Donald L. Tucker Civic Center (5,368); Tallahassee, FL
January 13, 2024; 2:15 p.m., The CW		at Notre Dame	W 67–58	10–6 (4–1)	13 – Spears	9 – Miller	Tied – 3	Joyce Center (6,427); South Bend, IN
January 17, 2024; 7:00 p.m., ACCN		at Miami (FL)	W 84–75	11–6 (5–1)	16 – Tied	8 – Miller	6 – Warley	Watsco Center (7,972); Coral Gables, FL
January 20, 2024; 4:00 p.m., ACCN		Clemson	L 67–78	11–7 (5–2)	15 – Watkins	5 – Green, Jr.	4 – Warley	Donald L. Tucker Civic Center (10,033); Tallahassee, FL
January 23, 2024; 7:00 p.m., ESPN2		at Syracuse	W 85–69	12–7 (6–2)	27 – Watkins	11 – Watkins	6 – Spears	JMA Wireless Dome (19,859); Syracuse, NY
January 27, 2024; 2:00 p.m., ESPN		No. 3 North Carolina	L 68–75	12–8 (6–3)	15 – Spears	6 – Miller	3 – Spears	Donald L. Tucker Civic Center (10,092); Tallahassee, FL
February 3, 2024; 8:00 p.m., ACCN		at Louisville	L 92–101	12–9 (6–4)	23 – Warley	6 – Tied	3 – Warley	KFC Yum! Center (11,287); Louisville, KY
February 6, 2024; 7:00 p.m., ACCN		at Boston College	W 63–62	13–9 (7–4)	10 – Watkins	6 – Tied	4 – Green, Jr.	Conte Forum (4,390); Chestnut Hill, MA
February 10, 2024; 8:00 p.m., The CW		Virginia	L 76–80	13–10 (7–5)	21 – Watkins	7 – Warley	2 – Tied	Donald L. Tucker Civic Center (8,525); Tallahassee, FL
February 13, 2024; 9:00 p.m., ESPNU		at Virginia Tech	L 75–83	13–11 (7–6)	26 – Watkins	6 – Watkins	4 – Watkins	Cassell Coliseum (8,925); Blacksburg, VA
February 17, 2024; 2:00 p.m., ESPN		No. 9 Duke	L 67–76	13–12 (7–7)	15 – Watkins	9 – Corhen	5 – Warley	Donald L. Tucker Civic Center (11,500); Tallahassee, FL
February 20, 2024; 7:00 p.m., ACCN		Boston College	W 84–76	14–12 (8–7)	22 – Watkins	11 – Watkins	5 – Warley	Donald L. Tucker Civic Center (6,009); Tallahassee, FL
February 24, 2024; 7:45 p.m., The CW		at Clemson	L 63–74	14–13 (8–8)	18 – Watkins	8 – Watkins	2 – Warley	Littlejohn Coliseum (9,000); Clemson, SC
February 27, 2024; 9:00 p.m., ESPN2		NC State	W 90–83	15–13 (9–8)	19 – Watkins	7 – Miller	6 – Spears	Donald L. Tucker Civic Center (4,727); Tallahassee, FL
March 2, 2024; 12:00 p.m., ESPN2		at Georgia Tech	L 76–85	15–14 (9–9)	15 – Watkins	7 – Tied	4 – Spears	McCamish Pavilion (5,908); Atlanta, GA
March 5, 2024; 9:00 p.m., ESPN2		at Pittsburgh	L 73–88	15–15 (9–10)	25 – Corhen	8 – Corhen	3 – Warley	Petersen Events Center (7,860); Pittsburgh, PA
March 9, 2024; 4:00 p.m., ESPN2		Miami (FL)	W 83–75	16–15 (10–10)	26 – Green, Jr.	11 – Watkins	5 – Watkins	Donald L. Tucker Civic Center (6,020); Tallahassee, FL
ACC Tournament
March 13, 2024; 12:00 p.m., ESPN	(9)	vs. (8) Virginia Tech; Second Round	W 86–76	17–15	34 – Watkins	11 – Watkins	4 – Warley	Capital One Arena (9,920); Washington, D.C.
March 14, 2024; 12:00 p.m., ESPN	(9)	vs. (1) No. 4 North Carolina; Quarterfinals	L 67–92	17–16	12 – Watkins	4 – Tied	5 – Watkins	Capital One Arena (14,920); Washington, D.C.
*Non-conference game. ^{#}Rankings from AP Poll. (#) Tournament seedings in parentheses. All times are in Eastern Time.

== Awards ==
Honors
Player	Award	Ref.
Jamir Watkins	ACC Co-Player of the Week (Week Three); Oscar Robertson National Player of the Week (Week Three); All-ACC Honorable Mention	

== Rankings ==
Ranking movements Legend: ██ Increase in ranking ██ Decrease in ranking — = Not ranked RV = Received votes
	Week																				
Poll	Pre	1	2	3	4	5	6	7	8	9	10	11	12	13	14	15	16	17	18	19	Final
AP	—	—	—	RV	—	—	—	—	—	—	—	—	—	—	—	—	—	—	—	—	—
Coaches	—	—	—	—	RV	—	—	—	—	—	RV	—	—	—	—	—	—	—	—	—	—
