= 2023–24 Miami Hurricanes men's basketball team =

American college basketball season

2023–24 Miami Hurricanes men's basketball

Bahamas Championship champions
- Conference: Atlantic Coast Conference
- Record: 15–17 (6–14 ACC)
- Head coach: Jim Larrañaga (13th season)
- Associate head coach: Bill Courtney
- Assistant coaches: D.J. Irving; Kotie Kimble
- Home arena: Watsco Center

2023–24 ACC men's basketball standings
	Conf.				Overall
Team	W		L	PCT	W		L	PCT
No. 7 North Carolina	17	–	3	.850	29	–	8	.784
No. 9 Duke	15	–	5	.750	27	–	9	.750
Virginia	13	–	7	.650	23	–	11	.676
Pittsburgh	12	–	8	.600	22	–	11	.667
Wake Forest	11	–	9	.550	21	–	14	.600
No. 14 Clemson	11	–	9	.550	24	–	12	.667
Syracuse	11	–	9	.550	20	–	12	.625
Virginia Tech	10	–	10	.500	19	–	15	.559
Florida State	10	–	10	.500	17	–	16	.515
No. 10 NC State †	9	–	11	.450	26	–	15	.634
Boston College	8	–	12	.400	20	–	16	.556
Notre Dame	7	–	13	.350	13	–	20	.394
Georgia Tech	7	–	13	.350	14	–	18	.438
Miami (FL)	6	–	14	.300	15	–	17	.469
Louisville	3	–	17	.150	8	–	24	.250
† 2024 ACC tournament winner Rankings from AP Poll

The 2023–24 Miami Hurricanes men's basketball team represented the University of Miami during the 2023–24 NCAA Division I men's basketball season. The Hurricanes were led by thirteenth-year head coach Jim Larrañaga, and played their home games at the Watsco Center on the university's campus in Coral Gables, Florida as members of the Atlantic Coast Conference (ACC).

The Hurricanes got to a hot start, going 11–2 in their first 13 games. Highlights of the streak included wins over Georgia and Kansas State at the Baha Mar Bahamas Hoops Championship and two conference wins over Notre Dame and sixteenth-ranked Clemson. They were ranked as highly as eighth when they lost to Kentucky in the ACC–SEC Challenge. Their fortunes turned, as they lost four of their next five ACC games, with the lone win coming against Virginia Tech. They won three of their next four and had a record of 6–5 in ACC play before they lost their final ten games in a row. They played three ranked teams in that time, losing to third-ranked North Carolina by only three points, eighth-ranked Duke, and again to North Carolina, who was ranked ninth at the time. Miami also struggled on the road, only winning two of their ten ACC road games.

The Hurricanes finished the 2023–24 season a disappointing 15–17 and 6–14 in ACC play to finish in fourteenth place. As the fourteenth seed in the ACC tournament, they lost to eleventh seed Boston College in the first round. They were not invited to the NCAA tournament or the NIT. This ended a streak of two straight post-season appearances for the Hurricanes.

== Previous season ==
The Hurricanes finished the 2022–23 season 29–8 and 15–5 in ACC play ACC play, to finish in a tie for first place and clinch a share of the regular season title. This was the team's second ACC regular season title in program history, with the first coming in 2013. As the first seed in the ACC tournament, they earned a bye to the quarterfinals, where they defeated ninth seed Wake Forest before losing to fourth seed and eventual champion Duke in the semifinals. They received an at-large bid to the NCAA Tournament, where they were the fifth seed in the Midwest Region. They defeated twelfth seed Drake in the first round, fourth seed Indiana in the second round, first seed Houston in the Sweet Sixteen and second seed Texas to qualify for the first Final Four in program history. In the Final Four, they lost to eventual champions UConn to end their season.

== Offseason ==
=== Departures ===
Departures
Name	Number	Pos.	Height	Weight	Year	Hometown	Reason for departure
Anthony Walker	1	F	6'9"	215	RS junior	Baltimore, MD	Transferred to Indiana
Isaiah Wong	2	G	6'3"	185	RS junior	Piscataway, NJ	Declared for 2023 NBA draft; Selected 55th overall by Indiana Pacers
Harlond Beverly	5	G	6'5"	195	RS sophomore	Detroit, MI	Transferred to Wichita State
Filippos Gkogkos	10	G	6'3"	193	RS junior	Athens, Greece	Walk-on; left team for personal reasons
Jordan Miller	11	G	6'7"	195	RS senior	Middleburg, VA	Graduated/2023 NBA draft; selected 48th overall by Los Angeles Clippers
Favour Aire	12	C	6'10"	212	Freshman	Ekpoma, Nigeria	Transferred to Penn State
Danilo Jovanovich	23	F	6'8"	205	Freshman	Milwaukee, WI	Transferred to Louisville
Thomas Oosterbroek	32	F	6'7"	235	Sophomore	Amsterdam, Netherlands	Walk-on; transferred to Portland

=== Incoming transfers ===
Incoming transfers
Name	Number	Pos.	Height	Weight	Year	Hometown	Previous school
Matthew Cleveland	0	G	6'7"	200	Junior	Atlanta, GA	Florida State

=== 2023 recruiting class ===
College recruiting
Name	Hometown	School	Height	Weight	Commit date
Michael Nwoko #16 C	Toronto, ON	Prolific Prep (CA)	6 ft 10 in (2.08 m)	240 lb (110 kg)	Oct 6, 2022
Michael Nwoko #16 C	Recruit ratings: Rivals: 247Sports: ESPN: (82)				
Kyshawn George #40 SG	Monthey, Switzerland	Lycée Emiland Gauthey (France)	6 ft 8 in (2.03 m)	196 lb (89 kg)	Apr 19, 2023
Kyshawn George #40 SG	Recruit ratings: Rivals: 247Sports: ESPN: (NR)				
Paul Djobet #71 SF	Lille, France	West Oaks Academy (FL)	6 ft 7 in (2.01 m)	193 lb (88 kg)	Jun 16, 2023
Paul Djobet #71 SF	Recruit ratings: Rivals: 247Sports: ESPN: (80)				
Overall recruit ranking: Rivals: 48
Note: In many cases, Scout, Rivals, 247Sports, On3, and ESPN may conflict in their listings of height and weight.; In these cases, the average was taken. ESPN grades are on a 100-point scale.; Sources: "Miami 2023 Basketball Commitments". Rivals.; "Miami Hurricanes". ESPN.; "2023 Team Ranking". Rivals.

== Roster ==
2023–24 Miami Hurricanes men's basketball team
Players
Coaches

Pos.	#	Name	Height	Weight	Year	Previous school	Hometown
G	0	Matthew Cleveland	6 ft 7 in (2.01 m)	200 lb (91 kg)	Jr	Pace Academy; Florida State	Atlanta, GA
C	1	Michael Nwoko	6 ft 10 in (2.08 m)	240 lb (109 kg)	Fr	Prolific Prep (CA)	Toronto, ON
G	3	Christian Watson	6 ft 7 in (2.01 m)	209 lb (95 kg)	So	St. John's College	Lanham, MD
G	4	Bensley Joseph	6 ft 1 in (1.85 m)	195 lb (88 kg)	Jr	Putnam Science Academy (CT)	Arlington, MA
G	5	Wooga Poplar	6 ft 5 in (1.96 m)	192 lb (87 kg)	Jr	Mathematics, Civics and Sciences	Philadelphia, PA
G	7	Kyshawn George	6 ft 8 in (2.03 m)	196 lb (89 kg)	Fr	Lycée Emiland Gauthey (France)	Monthey, Switzerland
G	10	Paul Djobet	6 ft 7 in (2.01 m)	193 lb (88 kg)	Fr	West Oaks Academy (FL)	Lille, France
F	11	Nick Cassano (W)	6 ft 7 in (2.01 m)	200 lb (91 kg)	Fr	Seacrest Country Day	Naples, FL
G	13	Jakai Robinson	6 ft 5 in (1.96 m)	208 lb (94 kg)	RS So	Rock Creek Christian Academy (NY)	Ossining, NY
F	15	Norchad Omier	6 ft 7 in (2.01 m)	248 lb (112 kg)	RS Jr	Miami Preparatory School; Arkansas State	Bluefields, Nicaragua
F	23	AJ Casey	6 ft 8 in (2.03 m)	213 lb (97 kg)	So	Whitney Young	Chicago, IL
G	24	Nijel Pack	6 ft 0 in (1.83 m)	180 lb (82 kg)	RS Jr	Larence Central; Kansas State	Indianapolis, IN

Head coach

- Jim Larrañaga (Providence)

Assistant coach(es)

- Bill Courtney (Bucknell)
- D.J. Irving (Boston University)
- Kotie Kimble (Coastal Carolina)

Legend

- (C) Team captain
- (S) Suspended
- (I) Ineligible
- (W) Walk-on
- Injured
- Current redshirt

Roster

== Schedule and results ==
Date time, TV	Rank^{#}	Opponent^{#}	Result	Record	High points	High rebounds	High assists	Site (attendance) city, state
Exhibition
October 29, 2023*; 2:00 p.m., ACCNX/ESPN+	No. 13	TCNJ	W 113–54	–	23 – Omier	12 – Omier	8 – Joseph	Watsco Center (784); Coral Gables, FL
Regular season
November 6, 2023*; 7:00 p.m., ACCNX/ESPN+	No. 13	NJIT	W 101–60	1–0	21 – Poplar	10 – Tied	9 – Pack	Watsco Center (6,861); Coral Gables, FL
November 10, 2023*; 7:00 p.m., ACCNX/ESPN+	No. 13	UCF	W 88–72	2–0	23 – Poplar	12 – Omier	5 – Joseph	Watsco Center (7,972); Coral Gables, FL
November 13, 2023*; 7:00 p.m., ACCNX/ESPN+	No. 12	FIU	W 86–80	3–0	23 – Cleveland	11 – Omier	5 – Pack	Watsco Center (6,620); Coral Gables, FL
November 17, 2023*; 3:30 p.m., CBSSN	No. 12	vs. Georgia; Baha Mar Bahamas Hoops Championship semifinals	W 79–68	4–0	18 – Cleveland	11 – Poplar	3 – Tied	Baha Mar Convention Center (1,833); Nassau, Bahamas
November 19, 2023*; 2:30 p.m., CBSSN	No. 12	vs. Kansas State; Baha Mar Hoops Bahamas Championship final	W 91–83	5–0	28 – Pack	7 – Omier	7 – Joseph	Baha Mar Convention Center (1,895); Nassau, Bahamas
November 28, 2023*; 7:30 p.m., ESPN	No. 8	at No. 12 Kentucky; ACC–SEC Challenge	L 73–95	5–1	20 – Omier	8 – Poplar	3 – Pack	Rupp Arena (20,119); Lexington, KY
December 2, 2023; 12:00 p.m., The CW	No. 8	Notre Dame	W 62–49	6–1 (1–0)	14 – Cleveland	13 – Omier	7 – Pack	Watsco Center (7,972); Coral Gables, FL
December 6, 2023*; 7:00 p.m., ACCNX/ESPN+	No. 15	LIU	W 97–49	7–1	17 – Omier	13 – Omier	5 – Poplar	Watsco Center (5,818); Coral Gables, FL
December 10, 2023*; 2:00 p.m., ESPN2	No. 15	vs. Colorado; NABC Brooklyn Showcase	L 63–90	7–2	17 – Cleveland	5 – Tied	2 – Tied	Barclays Center; Brooklyn, NY
December 16, 2023*; 12:00 p.m., The CW	No. 24	La Salle	W 84–77	8–2	25 – Poplar	9 – Cleveland	7 – Pack	Watsco Center (6,407); Coral Gables, FL
December 21, 2023*; 8:00 p.m., ACCN		Stonehill	W 97–59	9–2	24 – Poplar	17 – Omier	8 – Joseph	Watsco Center (5,616); Coral Gables, FL
December 29, 2023*; 6:00 p.m., ACCN		North Florida	W 95–55	10–2	27 – Omier	10 – Tied	10 – Joseph	Watsco Center (6,504); Coral Gables, FL
January 3, 2024; 8:00 p.m., ESPN		No. 16 Clemson	W 95–82	11–2 (2–0)	25 – Pack	6 – Tied	5 – George	Watsco Center (6,800); Coral Gables, FL
January 6, 2024; 2:15 p.m., The CW		at Wake Forest	L 82–86 ^{OT}	11–3 (2–1)	21 – George	13 – Omier	4 – Pack	LJVM Coliseum (8,706); Winston-Salem, NC
January 10, 2024; 7:00 p.m., ACCN		Louisville	L 71–80	11–4 (2–2)	22 – Cleveland	12 – Cleveland	5 – Joseph	Watsco Center (6,929); Coral Gables, FL
January 13, 2024; 7:00 p.m., ACCN		at Virginia Tech	W 75–71	12–4 (3–2)	21 – Cleveland	8 – Pack	5 – Pack	Cassell Coliseum (8,925); Blacksburg, VA
January 17, 2024; 7:00 p.m., ACCN		Florida State	L 75–84	12–5 (3–3)	19 – Pack	15 – Omier	3 – Tied	Watsco Center (7,972); Coral Gables, FL
January 20, 2024; 12:00 p.m., ESPN2		at Syracuse	L 69–72	12–6 (3–4)	19 – Pack	12 – Cleveland	4 – Cleveland	JMA Wireless Dome (20,960); Syracuse, NY
January 24, 2024; 7:00 p.m., ESPN2		at Notre Dame	W 73–61	13–6 (4–4)	33 – Omier	10 – Omier	5 – Pack	Joyce Center (5,948); South Bend, IN
January 27, 2024; 2:15 p.m., The CW		Pittsburgh	W 72–68	14–6 (5–4)	18 – Omier	10 – Omier	5 – Tied	Watsco Center (7,779); Coral Gables, FL
January 30, 2024; 9:00 p.m., ESPN2		at NC State	L 68–74	14–7 (5–5)	23 – Pack	12 – Omier	3 – Tied	PNC Arena (12,194); Raleigh, NC
February 3, 2024; 12:00 p.m., ESPN		Virginia Tech	W 75–71	15–7 (6–5)	16 – Tied	13 – Cleveland	2 – Tied	Watsco Center (7,234); Coral Gables, FL
February 5, 2024; 7:00 p.m., ESPN		at Virginia	L 38–60	15–8 (6–6)	11 – Omier	13 – Omier	5 – Pack	John Paul Jones Arena (14,165); Charlottesville, VA
February 10, 2024; 4:00 p.m., ESPN		No. 3 North Carolina	L 72–75	15–9 (6–7)	20 – Tied	11 – Omier	4 – Joseph	Watsco Center (7,972); Coral Gables, FL
February 14, 2024; 7:00 p.m., ESPN2		at Clemson	L 60–77	15–10 (6–8)	18 – Omier	12 – Omier	6 – George	Littlejohn Coliseum (7,211); Clemson, SC
February 17, 2024; 4:00 p.m., ACCN		at Boston College	L 77–85	15–11 (6–9)	20 – Tied	6 – Tied	7 – Joseph	Conte Forum (8,606); Chestnut Hill, MA
February 21, 2024; 7:00 p.m., ESPN		No. 8 Duke	L 55–84	15–12 (6–10)	15 – Tied	10 – Omier	4 – George	Watsco Center (7,972); Coral Gables, FL
February 24, 2024; 4:00 p.m., ACCN		Georgia Tech	L 76–80	15–13 (6–11)	16 – George	7 – Poplar	6 – George	Watsco Center (7,906); Coral Gables, FL
February 26, 2024; 7:00 p.m., ESPN		at No. 9 North Carolina	L 71–76	15–14 (6–12)	22 – Omier	11 – Cleveland	5 – Joseph	Dean Smith Center (21,027); Chapel Hill, NC
March 6, 2024; 7:00 p.m., ESPNU		Boston College	L 57–67	15–15 (6–13)	13 – Cleveland	13 – Omier	5 – Poplar	Watsco Center (7,372); Coral Gables, FL
March 9, 2024; 4:00 p.m., ESPN2		at Florida State	L 75–83	15–16 (6–14)	17 – Joseph	17 – Omier	4 – Joseph	Donald L. Tucker Civic Center (6,020); Tallahassee, FL
ACC tournament
March 12, 2024; 7:00 p.m., ACCN	(14)	vs. (11) Boston College; First Round	L 65–81	15–17	18 – Tied	13 – Omier	4 – Joseph	Capital One Arena (7,523); Washington, D.C.
*Non-conference game. ^{#}Rankings from AP Poll. (#) Tournament seedings in parentheses. All times are in Eastern Time.

== Rankings ==
Ranking movements Legend: ██ Increase in ranking ██ Decrease in ranking — = Not ranked RV = Received votes
	Week																				
Poll	Pre	1	2	3	4	5	6	7	8	9	10	11	12	13	14	15	16	17	18	19	Final
AP	13	12	10	8	15	24	RV	RV	RV	RV	—	—	—	—	—	—	—	—	—	—	RV
Coaches	13	11	11	8	15	24	RV	RV	RV	RV	—	—	—	—	—	—	—	—	—	—	—
