= 2023–24 Virginia Tech Hokies men's basketball team =

American college basketball season

2023–24 Virginia Tech Hokies men's basketball

NIT, Second Round
- Conference: Atlantic Coast Conference
- Record: 19–15 (10–10 ACC)
- Head coach: Mike Young (5th season)
- Assistant coaches: J. D. Byers; Kevin Giltner; Christian Webster
- Home arena: Cassell Coliseum

2023–24 ACC men's basketball standings
	Conf.				Overall
Team	W		L	PCT	W		L	PCT
No. 7 North Carolina	17	–	3	.850	29	–	8	.784
No. 9 Duke	15	–	5	.750	27	–	9	.750
Virginia	13	–	7	.650	23	–	11	.676
Pittsburgh	12	–	8	.600	22	–	11	.667
Wake Forest	11	–	9	.550	21	–	14	.600
No. 14 Clemson	11	–	9	.550	24	–	12	.667
Syracuse	11	–	9	.550	20	–	12	.625
Virginia Tech	10	–	10	.500	19	–	15	.559
Florida State	10	–	10	.500	17	–	16	.515
No. 10 NC State †	9	–	11	.450	26	–	15	.634
Boston College	8	–	12	.400	20	–	16	.556
Notre Dame	7	–	13	.350	13	–	20	.394
Georgia Tech	7	–	13	.350	14	–	18	.438
Miami (FL)	6	–	14	.300	15	–	17	.469
Louisville	3	–	17	.150	8	–	24	.250
† 2024 ACC tournament winner Rankings from AP Poll

The 2023–24 Virginia Tech Hokies men's basketball team represented Virginia Polytechnic Institute and State University during the U.S. 2023–24 NCAA Division I men's basketball season . The Hokies were led by fifth-year head coach Mike Young and played their home games at Cassell Coliseum in Blacksburg, Virginia, as members of the Atlantic Coast Conference.

The Hokies started the season with five wins and two losses. The two losses came against South Carolina and in the final of the ESPN Events Invitational against nineteenth ranked Florida Atlantic. The Hokies defeated Iowa State and Boise State in order to reach the final. They followed that with a loss in the ACC–SEC Challenge at Auburn and then won their next four games, including their ACC opener against Louisville. They would lose four of their next five ACC games, including a rivalry loss to Virginia. The one win in this stretch was an upset of twenty-first ranked Clemson. The Hokies went 3–3 over the next six ACC games, with a win against NC State and a loss to seventh-ranked Duke. The Hokies stayed close to .500 in their next five games, winning two and losing three. A highlight was a win in the rivalry re-match with Virginia but they lost to seventh-ranked North Carolina. They finished the season strongly, winning their last three ACC games.

The Hokies finished the season 19–15, 10–10 in ACC play to finish in a tie for eighth place. As the eighth seed in the ACC tournament, they lost to ninth seed Florida State in the Second Round. They received an at-large bid to the National Invitation Tournament and were a third seed. They defeated Richmond in the First Round before losing to second-seed Ohio State in the Second Round to end their season.

== Previous season ==
The Hokies finished the 2022–23 season 19–15, 8–12 in ACC play to finish in 11th place. In the ACC tournament, they defeated Notre Dame before losing to NC State in the second round. They received an at-large bid to the National Invitation Tournament where they lost to Cincinnati in the first round.

== Offseason ==
=== Departures ===
Departures
Name	Number	Pos.	Height	Weight	Year	Hometown	Reason for departure
Darren Buchanan Jr.	4	F	6'7"	235	Freshman	Washington, D.C.	Transferred to George Washington
Camden Johnson	10	G	6'1"	185	Sophomore	Waxhaw, NC	Walk-on; left the team for personal reasons
Darius Maddox	13	G	6'5"	180	Junior	Bowie, MD	Transferred to George Mason
Owyn Dawyot	14	G	6'2"	190	Freshman	Roanoke, VA	Walk-on; left the team for personal reasons
Grant Basile	21	F	6'9"	225	RS Senior	Pewaukee, WI	Graduated/undrafted in 2023 NBA draft
Justyn Mutts	25	F	6'7"	220	GS Senior	Millville, NJ	Graduated

=== Incoming transfers ===
Incoming transfers
Name	Number	Pos.	Height	Weight	Year	Hometown	Previous school
Mekhi Long	4	G	6'7"	200	Senior	Bryans Road, MD	Old Dominion
Tyler Nickel	23	G/F	6'7"	220	Sophomore	Harrisonburg, VA	North Carolina
Robbie Beran	31	F	6'9"	215	GS Senior	Richmond, VA	Northwestern

=== 2023 Recruiting class ===
College recruiting information
Name	Hometown	School	Height	Weight	Commit date
Brandon Rechsteiner #46 PG	Woodstock, GA	Etowah High School	6 ft 1 in (1.85 m)	185 lb (84 kg)	Jul 15, 2022
Brandon Rechsteiner #46 PG	Recruit ratings: Scout: Rivals: 247Sports: ESPN: (81)				
Jaydon Young #50 SG	Clover, SC	Westminster Catawba Christian	6 ft 3 in (1.91 m)	180 lb (82 kg)	Jul 29, 2022
Jaydon Young #50 SG	Recruit ratings: Scout: Rivals: 247Sports: ESPN: (80)				
Overall recruit ranking:
Note: In many cases, Scout, Rivals, 247Sports, On3, and ESPN may conflict in their listings of height and weight.; In these cases, the average was taken. ESPN grades are on a 100-point scale.; Sources: "Virginia Tech Hokies". ESPN.; "2023 Team Ranking". Rivals.

== Roster ==
2023–24 Virginia Tech Hokies men's basketball team
Players
Coaches

Pos.	#	Name	Height	Weight	Year	Previous school	Hometown
G	0	Hunter Cattoor	6 ft 3 in (1.91 m)	200 lb (91 kg)	GS	Bishop Moore	Orlando, FL
G	1	Rodney Rice	6 ft 4 in (1.93 m)	195 lb (88 kg)	So	DeMatha Catholic	Clinton, SC
G	2	Michael Collins Jr.	6 ft 4 in (1.93 m)	190 lb (86 kg)	So	Combine Academy	Clover, SC
G	3	Sean Pedulla	6 ft 1 in (1.85 m)	195 lb (88 kg)	Jr	Edmond Memorial	Edmond, OK
F	4	Mekhi Long	6 ft 7 in (2.01 m)	200 lb (91 kg)	Sr	Old Dominion	Bryans Road, MD
C	5	Patrick Wessler	7 ft 0 in (2.13 m)	255 lb (116 kg)	RS Fr	Combine Academy	Matthews, NC
G	10	Brandon Rechsteiner	6 ft 1 in (1.85 m)	185 lb (84 kg)	Fr	Etowah	Acworth, GA
F	11	John Camden	6 ft 8 in (2.03 m)	220 lb (100 kg)	RS So	Memphis	Downingtown, PA
G	13	Jaydon Young	6 ft 4 in (1.93 m)	205 lb (93 kg)	Fr	Greensboro Day School	Goldsboro, NC
G	14	Conner Venable (W)	6 ft 3 in (1.91 m)	190 lb (86 kg)	Fr	The Heights School	Washington, D.C.
C	15	Lynn Kidd	6 ft 10 in (2.08 m)	235 lb (107 kg)	Sr	Clemson	Gainesvlle, FL
G/F	23	Tyler Nickel	6 ft 7 in (2.01 m)	220 lb (100 kg)	So	North Carolina	Harrisonburg, VA
F	31	Robbie Beran	6 ft 9 in (2.06 m)	215 lb (98 kg)	GS	Northwestern	Richmond, VA
G	33	Michael Ward (W)	6 ft 2 in (1.88 m)	175 lb (79 kg)	So	Walt Whitman	Bethesda, MD
F	34	Mylyjael Poteat	6 ft 9 in (2.06 m)	265 lb (120 kg)	Sr	Rice	Reidsville, NC

Head coach

- Mike Young (Emory & Henry)

Assistant coach(es)

- J. D. Byers (Lebanon Valley)
- Kevin Giltner (Wofford)
- Christian Webster (Harvard)

Legend

- (C) Team captain
- (S) Suspended
- (I) Ineligible
- (W) Walk-on
- Injured
- Current redshirt

Roster

== Schedule and results ==
Date time, TV	Rank^{#}	Opponent^{#}	Result	Record	High points	High rebounds	High assists	Site (attendance) city, state
Regular season
November 6, 2023*; 8:00 p.m., ACCNX/ESPN+		Coppin State	W 100–55	1–0	15 – Pedulla	11 – Kidd	10 – Pedulla	Cassell Coliseum (8,925); Blacksburg, VA
November 10, 2023*; 9:30 p.m., ACCN		vs. South Carolina; He Gets Us Hall of Fame Series	L 77–79	1–1	26 – Pedulla	9 – Pedulla	5 – Pedulla	Spectrum Center (6,783); Charlotte, NC
November 15, 2023*; 6:00 p.m., ACCNX/ESPN+		Campbell	W 60–44	2–1	24 – Kidd	15 – Kidd	5 – Pedulla	Cassell Coliseum (5,899); Blacksburg, VA
November 19, 2023*; 5:00 p.m., ACCNX/ESPN+		Wofford	W 98–76	3–1	20 – Kidd	7 – Kidd	3 – Tied	Cassell Coliseum (4,582); Blacksburg, VA
November 23, 2023*; 8:00 p.m., ESPNU		vs. Boise State; ESPN Events Invitational quarterfinals	W 82–75	4–1	19 – Tied	6 – Tied	7 – Pedulla	State Farm Field House (2,458); Bay Lake, FL
November 24, 2023*; 5:30 p.m., ESPN2		vs. Iowa State; ESPN Events Invitational semifinals	W 71–62	5–1	18 – Cattoor	8 – Long	6 – Pedulla	State Farm Field House (2,579); Bay Lake, FL
November 26, 2023*; 1:00 p.m., ESPN		vs. No. 19 Florida Atlantic; ESPN Events Invitational championship game	L 50–84	5–2	11 – Tied	9 – Long	1 – Tied	State Farm Field House (2,528); Bay Lake, FL
November 29, 2023*; 9:15 p.m., ESPN2		at Auburn; ACC–SEC Challenge	L 57–74	5–3	16 – Cattoor	7 – Tied	2 – Rechsteiner	Neville Arena (9,121); Auburn, AL
December 3, 2023; 4:00 p.m., ACCN		Louisville	W 75–68	6–3 (1–0)	20 – Collins	8 – Long	4 – Tied	Cassell Coliseum (8,925); Blacksburg, VA
December 9, 2023*; 12:00 p.m., The CW		Valparaiso	W 71–50	7–3	19 – Cattoor	6 – Tied	3 – Tied	Cassell Coliseum (6,107); Blacksburg, VA
December 16, 2023*; 4:00 p.m., ACCN		Vermont	W 73–51	8–3	17 – Kidd	11 – Kidd	3 – Rechsteiner	Cassell Coliseum (4,918); Blacksburg, VA
December 21, 2023*; 5:00 p.m., ACCNX/ESPN+		American	W 77–55	9–3	31 – Kidd	11 – Kidd	11 – Rechsteiner	Cassell Coliseum (4,886); Blacksburg, VA
December 30, 2023; 2:00 p.m., ESPN2		at Wake Forest	L 63–86	9–4 (1–1)	14 – Tied	6 – Cattoor	3 – Kidd	LJVM Coliseum (10,055); Winston-Salem, NC
January 6, 2023; 4:00 p.m., ACCN		at Florida State	L 74–77	9–5 (1–2)	26 – Pedulla	8 – Kidd	3 – Kidd	Donald L. Tucker Civic Center (5,025); Tallahassee, FL
January 10, 2024; 7:00 p.m., ESPN2		No. 21 Clemson	W 87–72	10–5 (2–2)	32 – Pedulla	8 – Beran	7 – Tied	Cassell Coliseum (8,925); Blacksburg, VA
January 13, 2024; 7:00 p.m., ACCN		Miami (FL)	L 71–75	10–6 (2–3)	33 – Pedulla	10 – Pedulla	4 – Tied	Cassell Coliseum (8,925); Blacksburg, VA
January 17, 2024; 7:00 p.m., ESPNU		at Virginia; Rivalry	L 57–65	10–7 (2–4)	18 – Pedulla	6 – Tied	5 – Pedulla	John Paul Jones Arena (14,547); Charlottesville, VA
January 20, 2024; 12:00 p.m., The CW		at NC State	W 84–78	11–7 (3–4)	19 – Cattoor	6 – Kidd	9 – Pedulla	PNC Arena (15,850); Raleigh, NC
January 23, 2024; 9:00 p.m., ACCN		Boston College	W 76–71	12–7 (4–4)	17 – Cattoor	6 – Pedulla	4 – Pedulla	Cassell Coliseum (8,925); Blacksburg, VA
January 27, 2024; 5:00 p.m., ACCN		Georgia Tech	W 91–67	13–7 (5–4)	18 – Tied	9 – Beran	5 – Tied	Cassell Coliseum (8,925); Blacksburg, VA
January 29, 2024; 7:00 p.m., ESPN		No. 7 Duke	L 67–77	13–8 (5–5)	17 – Collins	6 – Poteat	6 – Pedulla	Cassell Coliseum (8,925); Blacksburg, VA
February 3, 2024; 12:00 p.m., ESPN		at Miami (FL)	L 74–82	13–9 (5–6)	33 – Pedulla	10 – Pedulla	4 – Tied	Watsco Center (8,925); Coral Gables, FL
February 10, 2024; 6:00 p.m., The CW		at Notre Dame	L 66–74	13–10 (5–7)	18 – Cattoor	13 – Beran	5 – Collins	Joyce Center (7,394); South Bend, IN
February 13, 2024; 9:00 p.m., ESPNU		Florida State	W 83–75	14–10 (6–7)	20 – Cattoor	15 – Kidd	4 – Pedulla	Cassell Coliseum (8,925); Blacksburg, VA
February 17, 2024; 2:00 p.m., ACCN		at No. 7 North Carolina	L 81–96	14–11 (6–8)	18 – Collins	8 – Poteat	5 – Pedulla	Dean Smith Center (21,750); Chapel Hill, NC
February 19, 2024; 7:00 p.m., ESPN		Virginia; Rivalry	W 75–41	15–11 (7–8)	14 – Kidd	7 – Kidd	6 – Nickel	Cassell Coliseum (8,925); Blacksburg, VA
February 24, 2024; 5:30 p.m., The CW		at Pittsburgh	L 64–79	15–12 (7–9)	26 – Pedulla	8 – Pedulla	7 – Pedulla	Petersen Events Center (12,094); Pittsburgh, PA
February 27, 2023; 7:00 p.m., ESPNU		at Syracuse	L 71–84	15–13 (7–10)	18 – Pedulla	8 – Kidd	4 – Tied	JMA Wireless Dome (20,244); Syracuse, NY
March 2, 2023; 5:30 p.m., The CW		Wake Forest	W 87–76	16–13 (8–10)	26 – Cattoor	9 – Kidd	6 – Pedulla	Cassell Coliseum (8,925); Blacksburg, VA
March 5, 2024; 7:00 p.m., ESPNU		at Louisville	W 80–64	17–13 (9–10)	15 – Pedulla	9 – Kidd	7 – Pedulla	KFC Yum! Center (10,544); Louisville, KY
March 9, 2024; 2:30 p.m., ESPNU		Notre Dame	W 82–76	18–13 (10–10)	28 – Pedulla	8 – Tied	4 – Collins	Cassell Coliseum (8,925); Blacksburg, VA
ACC tournament
March 13, 2024; 12:00 p.m., ESPN	(8)	vs. (9) Florida State; Second Round	L 76–86	18–14	24 – Pedulla	7 – Nickel	5 – Pedulla	Capital One Arena (9,920); Washington, D.C.
NIT
March 19, 2024; 9:00 p.m., ESPN2	(3)	Richmond; First Round - Wake Forest Bracket	W 74–58	19–14	20 – Kidd	8 – Kidd	7 – Pedulla	Cassell Coliseum (3,183); Blacksburg, VA
March 23, 2024; 7:00 p.m., ESPN+	(3)	at (2) Ohio State; Second Round - Wake Forest Bracket	L 73–81	19–15	18 – Tied	6 – Tied	8 – Pedulla	Value City Arena (7,541); Columbus, OH
*Non-conference game. ^{#}Rankings from AP Poll. (#) Tournament seedings in parentheses. All times are in Eastern Time.

== Rankings ==
Ranking movements Legend: — = Not ranked
	Week																				
Poll	Pre	1	2	3	4	5	6	7	8	9	10	11	12	13	14	15	16	17	18	19	Final
AP	—	—	—	—	—	—	—	—	—	—	—	—	—	—	—	—	—	—	—	—	—
Coaches	—	—	—	—	—	—	—	—	—	—	—	—	—	—	—	—	—	—	—	—	—
