= 2023–24 Louisville Cardinals men's basketball team =

American college basketball season

2023–24 Louisville Cardinals men's basketball
- Conference: Atlantic Coast Conference
- Record: 8–24 (3–17 ACC)
- Head coach: Kenny Payne (2nd season)
- Associate head coach: Danny Manning (2nd season)
- Assistant coaches: Nolan Smith (2nd season); Josh Jamieson (2nd season)
- Home arena: KFC Yum! Center

2023–24 ACC men's basketball standings
| | Conf. | | | | Overall |
| Team | W | | L | PCT | W | | L | PCT |
|---|---|---|---|---|---|---|---|---|
| No. 7 North Carolina | 17 | – | 3 | .850 | 29 | – | 8 | .784 |
| No. 9 Duke | 15 | – | 5 | .750 | 27 | – | 9 | .750 |
| Virginia | 13 | – | 7 | .650 | 23 | – | 11 | .676 |
| Pittsburgh | 12 | – | 8 | .600 | 22 | – | 11 | .667 |
| Wake Forest | 11 | – | 9 | .550 | 21 | – | 14 | .600 |
| No. 14 Clemson | 11 | – | 9 | .550 | 24 | – | 12 | .667 |
| Syracuse | 11 | – | 9 | .550 | 20 | – | 12 | .625 |
| Virginia Tech | 10 | – | 10 | .500 | 19 | – | 15 | .559 |
| Florida State | 10 | – | 10 | .500 | 17 | – | 16 | .515 |
| No. 10 NC State † | 9 | – | 11 | .450 | 26 | – | 15 | .634 |
| Boston College | 8 | – | 12 | .400 | 20 | – | 16 | .556 |
| Notre Dame | 7 | – | 13 | .350 | 13 | – | 20 | .394 |
| Georgia Tech | 7 | – | 13 | .350 | 14 | – | 18 | .438 |
| Miami (FL) | 6 | – | 14 | .300 | 15 | – | 17 | .469 |
| Louisville | 3 | – | 17 | .150 | 8 | – | 24 | .250 |
† 2024 ACC tournament winner Rankings from AP Poll

The 2023–24 Louisville Cardinals men's basketball team represented the University of Louisville during the 2023–24 NCAA Division I men's basketball season. The team played its home games on Denny Crum Court at the KFC Yum! Center in downtown Louisville, Kentucky as members of the Atlantic Coast Conference (ACC). They were led by second-year head coach Kenny Payne.

The Cardinals began the season with a one-point win against UMBC but lost to Chattanooga in their second game of the season. After defeating Coppin State, they lost both of their games in the Empire Classic. They then went on a two-game winning streak, including an overtime victory over New Mexico State. They went on a three-game losing streak from there, including an opening ACC game loss to Virginia Tech. Their only other win in 2023 was on December 17 against Pepperdine. The Cardinals first ACC win came at Miami (FL) on January 10, 2024. This was Payne's first road win as head coach. The team lost six straight games after the win. Their next wins came on February 3 and February 10, 2024, and were split by a road loss to Syracuse. The Cardinals would lose their final seven games of the ACC regular season.

The Cardinals finished the 2023–24 season 8–24 and 3–17 in ACC play to finish in fifteenth place. As the fifteenth seed in the ACC tournament, they lost to tenth seed NC State in the First Round. They were not invited to the NCAA tournament or the NIT. After their ACC tournament loss, the Cardinals fired head coach Kenny Payne.

The Louisville Cardinals men's basketball team drew an average home attendance of 11,504 in 18 games in 2023–24, the 28th highest in college basketball.

== Previous season ==
The team's 0–9 start was its worst since the 1940–41 season, when the Cardinals began the season 0–11. Before their first win of the season against Western Kentucky on December 14, 2022, the Cardinals contended with California for the worst start in modern history for any team that was at the time a member of a power conference, defined here as a member of a Power Five conference or the Big East Conference. California was the first such team to fall to 0–7, doing so on November 26, 2022; Louisville reached that mark three days later. California fell to 0–12 before its first win of the season. The Cardinals' start was still the worst for any team in ACC history.

The Cardinals finished the 2022–23 season 4–28 and 2–18 in ACC play to finish in fifteenth place. As the fifteenth seed in the ACC tournament, they lost to tenth seed Boston College in the First Round. They were not invited to the NCAA tournament or the NIT. Their 28 losses were the most in program history, and their four wins were the lowest since 1940–41.

== Offseason ==
=== Departures ===
Departures
| Name | Number | Pos. | Height | Weight | Year | Hometown | Reason for departure |
|---|---|---|---|---|---|---|---|
| Devin Ree | 0 | F | 6'8" | 180 | Freshman | Jackson, MS | Transferred to Louisiana Tech |
| El Ellis | 3 | G | 6'3" | 180 | Junior | Durham, NC | Transferred to Arkansas |
| Roosevelt Wheeler | 4 | F/C | 6'11" | 240 | Sophomore | Richmond, VA | Transferred to VCU |
| Fabio Basili | 11 | G | 6'4" | 175 | Freshman | Orlando, FL | Transferred to UT Arlington |
| Sydney Curry | 21 | F | 6'8" | 270 | Junior | Fort Wayne, IN | Transferred to Grand Canyon |
| Kamari Lands | 22 | F | 6'8" | 220 | Freshman | Indianapolis, IN | Transferred to Arizona State |
| Jae'Lyn Withers | 24 | F | 6'9" | 230 | (redshirt) Junior | Charlotte, NC | Transferred to North Carolina |
| Ashton Myles-Devore | 30 | G | 6'1" | 165 | Junior | Versailles, KY | Walk-on; transferred |

=== Incoming transfers ===
Incoming transfers
| Name | Number | Pos. | Height | Weight | Year | Hometown | Previous school |
|---|---|---|---|---|---|---|---|
| Koron Davis | 3 | G | 6'7" | 185 | Junior | Gary, IN | Los Angeles Southwest College |
| Danilo Jovanovich | 13 | F | 6'8" | 205 | Sophomore | Milwaukee, WI | Miami (FL) |
| Tre White | 22 | G | 6'7" | 190 | Sophomore | Dallas, TX | USC |
| Skyy Clark | 55 | G | 6'3" | 200 | Sophomore | Los Angeles, CA | Illinois |

=== 2023 recruiting class ===
College recruiting information
| Name | Hometown | School | Height | Weight | Commit date |
|---|---|---|---|---|---|
| Dennis Evans #12 C | Riverside, CA | Hillcrest High School | 7 ft 0 in (2.13 m) | 225 lb (102 kg) | Mar 12, 2023 |
| Dennis Evans #12 C | Recruit ratings: Rivals: 247Sports: ESPN: (85) | | | | |
| Kaleb Glenn #20 PF | Louisville, KY | Louisville Male High School | 6 ft 5 in (1.96 m) | 220 lb (100 kg) | Sep 24, 2021 |
| Kaleb Glenn #20 PF | Recruit ratings: Rivals: 247Sports: ESPN: (84) | | | | |
| Curtis Williams #11 SF | Birmingham, MI | Brother Rice High School | 6 ft 5 in (1.96 m) | 180 lb (82 kg) | Sep 19, 2022 |
| Curtis Williams #11 SF | Recruit ratings: Rivals: 247Sports: ESPN: (84) | | | | |
| Ty-Laur Johnson #21 PG | Bronx, NY | Our Savior Lutheran High School | 6 ft 0 in (1.83 m) | 160 lb (73 kg) | May 22, 2023 |
| Ty-Laur Johnson #21 PG | Recruit ratings: Rivals: 247Sports: ESPN: (82) | | | | |
Overall recruit ranking:
Note: In many cases, Scout, Rivals, 247Sports, On3, and ESPN may conflict in their listings of height and weight.; In these cases, the average was taken. ESPN grades are on a 100-point scale.; Sources: "2023 Louisville Commitments". Rivals.; "Men's Basketball Recruiting". Scout.; "ESPN- Louisville Cardinals Men's Basketball Recruiting". ESPN.; "Scout.com Team Recruiting Rankings". Scout.; "2023 Team Ranking". Rivals.

=== 2024 recruiting class ===
College recruiting information (2024)
| Name | Hometown | School | Height | Weight | Commit date |
|---|---|---|---|---|---|
| T.J. Robinson #36 PG | Montclair, NJ | Immaculate Conception High School | 6 ft 2 in (1.88 m) | 150 lb (68 kg) | Sep 24, 2021 |
| T.J. Robinson #36 PG | Recruit ratings: Rivals: 247Sports: ESPN: (81) | | | | |
Overall recruit ranking:
Note: In many cases, Scout, Rivals, 247Sports, On3, and ESPN may conflict in their listings of height and weight.; In these cases, the average was taken. ESPN grades are on a 100-point scale.; Sources: "2024 Louisville Commitments". Rivals.; "Men's Basketball Recruiting". Scout.; "ESPN- Louisville Cardinals Men's Basketball Recruiting". ESPN.; "Scout.com Team Recruiting Rankings". Scout.; "2024 Team Ranking". Rivals.

== Roster ==
2023–24 Louisville Cardinals men's basketball team
Players
Coaches

| Pos. | # | Name | Height | Weight | Year | Previous school | Hometown |
|---|---|---|---|---|---|---|---|
| G/F | 0 | Mike James | 6 ft 6 in (1.98 m) | 220 lb (100 kg) | RS So | Oak Ridge | Orlando, FL |
| G/F | 1 | Curtis Williams | 6 ft 5 in (1.96 m) | 205 lb (93 kg) | Fr | Brother Rice | Detroit, MI |
| G | 3 | Koron Davis | 6 ft 6 in (1.98 m) | 185 lb (84 kg) | Jr | Bowman Academy; Los Angeles Southwest College | Gary, IN |
| G | 4 | Ty-Laur Johnson | 6 ft 0 in (1.83 m) | 160 lb (73 kg) | Fr | Our Saviour Lutheran School | Brooklyn, NY |
| F | 5 | Brandon Huntley-Hatfield | 6 ft 10 in (2.08 m) | 240 lb (109 kg) | Jr | Scotland Campus Prep (PA); Tennessee | Clarksville, TN |
| F | 10 | Kaleb Glenn | 6 ft 6 in (1.98 m) | 205 lb (93 kg) | Fr | La Lumiere School | Louisville, KY |
| C | 11 | Dennis Evans | 7 ft 1 in (2.16 m) | 215 lb (98 kg) | Fr | Hillcrest | Riverside, CA |
| F | 12 | JJ Traynor | 6 ft 8 in (2.03 m) | 190 lb (86 kg) | Sr | Bardstown | Bardstown, KY |
| F | 13 | Danilo Jovanovich | 6 ft 8 in (2.03 m) | 220 lb (100 kg) | So | Whitnall; Miami (FL) | Milwaukee, WI |
| G | 15 | Hercy Miller | 6 ft 3 in (1.91 m) | 175 lb (79 kg) | Jr | Minnehaha Academy; Xavier | Minneapolis, MN |
| G | 22 | Tre White | 6 ft 7 in (2.01 m) | 205 lb (93 kg) | So | Prolific Prep; USC | Dallas, TX |
| G/F | 23 | Zan Payne (W) | 6 ft 5 in (1.96 m) | 230 lb (104 kg) | GS | Lexington Catholic; Kentucky | Lexington, KY |
| G | 33 | Aidan McCool (W) | 6 ft 3 in (1.91 m) | 170 lb (77 kg) | Sr | Bishop England; Maryland | Charleston, SC |
| F/C | 34 | Emmanuel Okorafor | 6 ft 9 in (2.06 m) | 220 lb (100 kg) | So | NBA Academy Africa | Abia, Nigeria |
| G | 55 | Skyy Clark | 6 ft 3 in (1.91 m) | 205 lb (93 kg) | So | Montverde Academy; Illinois | Los Angeles, CA |

Head coach

- Kenny Payne (Louisville)

Assistant coach(es)

- Danny Manning (Kansas)
- Nolan Smith (Duke)
- Josh Jamieson (Southern Oregon)

Legend

- (C) Team captain
- (S) Suspended
- (I) Ineligible
- (W) Walk-on
- Injured
- Current redshirt

Roster

== Schedule and results ==
| Date time, TV | Rank^{#} | Opponent^{#} | Result | Record | High points | High rebounds | High assists | Site (attendance) city, state |
Exhibition
| October 18, 2023*; 7:00 p.m., ACCNX/ESPN+ | | Simmons (KY) | W 91–50 | – | 15 – Williams | 9 – Evans | 6 – Clark | KFC Yum! Center (11,118); Louisville, KY |
| October 30, 2023*; 7:00 p.m., ACCNX/ESPN+ | | Kentucky Wesleyan | L 68–71 | – | 24 – Clark | 7 – Tied | 2 – Tied | KFC Yum! Center (10,112); Louisville, KY |
Regular season
| November 6, 2023*; 7:00 p.m., ACCNX/ESPN+ | | UMBC | W 94–93 | 1–0 | 25 – James | 10 – Tied | 3 – Clark | KFC Yum! Center (11,010); Louisville, KY |
| November 10, 2023*; 7:00 p.m., ACCNX/ESPN+ | | Chattanooga | L 71–81 | 1–1 | 17 – Tied | 14 – Huntley-Hatfield | 4 – Clark | KFC Yum! Center (10,634); Louisville, KY |
| November 15, 2023*; 7:00 p.m., ACCNX/ESPN+ | | Coppin State | W 61–41 | 2–1 | 12 – James | 12 – White | 2 – Tied | KFC Yum! Center (10,501); Louisville, KY |
| November 19, 2023*; 3:30 p.m., ESPN | | vs. No. 19 Texas; Empire Classic semifinals | L 80–81 | 2–2 | 20 – Tied | 9 – Huntley-Hatfield | 6 – Johnson | Madison Square Garden (17,647); New York, NY |
| November 20, 2023*; 4:30 p.m., ESPNU | | vs. Indiana; Empire Classic consolation game | L 66–74 | 2–3 | 19 – Clark | 9 – Huntley-Hatfield | 4 – Johnson | Madison Square Garden (10,988); New York, NY |
| November 26, 2023*; 1:00 p.m., ACCNX/ESPN+ | | New Mexico State | W 90–84 ^{OT} | 3–3 | 29 – Clark | 9 – Traynor | 6 – Johnson | KFC Yum! Center (10,527); Louisville, KY |
| November 29, 2023*; 8:00 p.m., ACCNX/ESPN+ | | Bellarmine | W 73–68 | 4–3 | 21 – Clark | 10 – Huntley-Hatfield | 5 – Johnson | KFC Yum! Center (11,538); Louisville, KY |
| December 3, 2023; 4:00 p.m., ACCN | | at Virginia Tech | L 68–75 | 4–4 (0–1) | 16 – Clark | 9 – James | 4 – Tied | Cassell Coliseum (8,925); Blacksburg, VA |
| December 9, 2023*; 2:00 p.m., FS1 | | at DePaul | L 68–75 | 4–5 | 18 – James | 8 – White | 5 – Johnson | Wintrust Arena (4,255); Chicago, IL |
| December 13, 2023*; 8:00 p.m., ACCN | | Arkansas State | L 63–75 | 4–6 | 20 – Huntley-Hatfield | 5 – Huntley-Hatfield | 3 – Johnson | KFC Yum! Center (10,401); Louisville, KY |
| December 17, 2023*; 2:00 p.m., ACCN | | Pepperdine | W 85–63 | 5–6 | 20 – Huntley-Hatfield | 12 – Huntley-Hatfield | 5 – Clark | KFC Yum! Center (10,475); Louisville, KY |
| December 21, 2023*; 6:00 p.m., ESPN | | No. 9 Kentucky; Rivalry | L 76–95 | 5–7 | 20 – Clark | 11 – Huntley-Hatfield | 5 – Clark | KFC Yum! Center (17,293); Louisville, KY |
| January 3, 2024; 7:00 p.m., ESPN2 | | at Virginia | L 53–77 | 5–8 (0–2) | 14 – Williams | 9 – Tied | 4 – Tied | John Paul Jones Arena (13,703); Charlottesville, VA |
| January 6, 2024; 12:00 p.m., The CW | | Pittsburgh | L 70–83 | 5–9 (0–3) | 23 – James | 7 – Glenn | 6 – Johnson | KFC Yum! Center (10,883); Louisville, KY |
| January 10, 2024; 7:00 p.m., ACCN | | at Miami (FL) | W 80–71 | 6–9 (1–3) | 26 – James | 9 – Huntley-Hatfield | 6 – Clark | Watsco Center (6,929); Coral Gables, FL |
| January 13, 2024; 12:00 p.m., The CW | | NC State | L 83–89 | 6–10 (1–4) | 20 – James | 10 – Huntley-Hatfield | 5 – Johnson | KFC Yum! Center (12,114); Louisville, KY |
| January 17, 2024; 9:00 p.m., ACCN | | at No. 4 North Carolina | L 70–86 | 6–11 (1–5) | 16 – Clark | 6 – Huntley-Hatfield | 4 – Tied | Dean Smith Center (20,298); Chapel Hill, NC |
| January 20, 2024; 12:00 p.m., ESPNU | | at Wake Forest | L 65–90 | 6–12 (1–6) | 17 – White | 6 – White | 6 – Clark | LJVM Coliseum (9,261); Winston-Salem, NC |
| January 23, 2024; 7:00 p.m., ACCN | | No. 12 Duke | L 69–83 | 6–13 (1–7) | 20 – Huntley-Hatfield | 11 – Huntley-Hatfield | 4 – Clark | KFC Yum! Center (12,620); Louisville, KY |
| January 27, 2024; 12:00 p.m., The CW | | Virginia | L 52–69 | 6–14 (1–8) | 10 – White | 10 – Huntley-Hatfield | 2 – Clark | KFC Yum! Center (11,381); Louisville, KY |
| January 30, 2024; 7:00 p.m., ACCN | | at Clemson | L 64–70 | 6–15 (1–9) | 29 – White | 14 – White | 2 – White | Littlejohn Coliseum (6,760); Clemson, SC |
| February 3, 2024; 8:00 p.m., ACCN | | Florida State | W 101–92 | 7–15 (2–9) | 29 – Huntley-Hatfield | 7 – Tied | 11 – Johnson | KFC Yum! Center (11,287); Louisville, KY |
| February 7, 2024; 7:00 p.m., ACCN | | at Syracuse | L 92–94 | 7–16 (2–10) | 23 – Clark | 13 – Huntley-Hatfield | 6 – Johnson | JMA Wireless Dome (19,426); Syracuse, NY |
| February 10, 2024; 6:30 p.m., ACCN | | Georgia Tech | W 79–67 | 8–16 (3–10) | 15 – Glenn | 13 – Glenn | 5 – Johnson | KFC Yum! Center (11,891); Louisville, KY |
| February 13, 2024; 9:00 p.m., ACCN | | at Boston College | L 77–89 | 8–17 (3–11) | 21 – Tied | 9 – Huntley-Hatfield | 7 – Johnson | Conte Forum (3,459); Chestnut Hill, MA |
| February 17, 2024; 6:30 p.m., ACCN | | at Pittsburgh | L 59–86 | 8–18 (3–12) | 17 – Glenn | 11 – White | 5 – James | Petersen Events Center (11,419); Pittsburgh, PA |
| February 21, 2024; 7:00 p.m., ESPNU | | Notre Dame | L 50–72 | 8–19 (3–13) | 18 – Clark | 8 – Clark | 3 – Johnson | KFC Yum! Center (11,342); Louisville, KY |
| February 28, 2024; 7:00 p.m., ACCN | | at No. 10 Duke | L 59–84 | 8–20 (3–14) | 15 – White | 10 – Huntley-Hatfield | 4 – Tied | Cameron Indoor Stadium (9,314); Durham, NC |
| March 2, 2024; 8:00 p.m., ACCN | | Syracuse | L 76–82 | 8–21 (3–15) | 18 – James | 11 – Huntley-Hatfield | 5 – Clark | KFC Yum! Center (11,011); Louisville, KY |
| March 5, 2024; 7:00 p.m., ESPNU | | Virginia Tech | L 64–80 | 8–22 (3–16) | 19 – Huntley-Hatfield | 8 – Glenn | 4 – Johnson | KFC Yum! Center (10,544); Louisville, KY |
| March 9, 2024; 5:30 p.m., The CW | | Boston College | L 61–67 | 8–23 (3–17) | 14 – Huntley-Hatfield | 9 – Huntley-Hatfield | 5 – Clark | KFC Yum! Center (11,615); Louisville, KY |
ACC tournament
| March 12, 2024; 4:30 p.m., ACCN | (15) | vs. (10) NC State; First round | L 85–94 | 8–24 | 36 – Clark | 7 – Huntley-Hatfield | 4 – Huntley-Hatfield | Capital One Arena (7,523); Washington, D.C. |
*Non-conference game. ^{#}Rankings from AP Poll. (#) Tournament seedings in parentheses. All times are in Eastern Time.

Schedule Source:

== Rankings ==
Ranking movements Legend: — = Not ranked
| | Week | | | | | | | | | | | | | | | | | | | | |
| Poll | Pre | 1 | 2 | 3 | 4 | 5 | 6 | 7 | 8 | 9 | 10 | 11 | 12 | 13 | 14 | 15 | 16 | 17 | 18 | 19 | Final |
|---|---|---|---|---|---|---|---|---|---|---|---|---|---|---|---|---|---|---|---|---|---|
| AP | — | — | — | — | — | — | — | — | — | — | — | — | — | — | — | — | — | — | — | — | — |
| Coaches | — | — | — | — | — | — | — | — | — | — | — | — | — | — | — | — | — | — | — | — | — |
