= 2023–24 Georgia Tech Yellow Jackets men's basketball team =

American college basketball season

2023–24 Georgia Tech Yellow Jackets men's basketball
- Conference: Atlantic Coast Conference
- Record: 14–18 (7–13 ACC)
- Head coach: Damon Stoudamire (1st season)
- Associate head coach: Karl Hobbs (1st season)
- Assistant coaches: Terry Parker Jr. (1st season); Pershin Williams (1st season)
- Home arena: McCamish Pavilion

2023–24 ACC men's basketball standings
	Conf.				Overall
Team	W		L	PCT	W		L	PCT
No. 7 North Carolina	17	–	3	.850	29	–	8	.784
No. 9 Duke	15	–	5	.750	27	–	9	.750
Virginia	13	–	7	.650	23	–	11	.676
Pittsburgh	12	–	8	.600	22	–	11	.667
Wake Forest	11	–	9	.550	21	–	14	.600
No. 14 Clemson	11	–	9	.550	24	–	12	.667
Syracuse	11	–	9	.550	20	–	12	.625
Virginia Tech	10	–	10	.500	19	–	15	.559
Florida State	10	–	10	.500	17	–	16	.515
No. 10 NC State †	9	–	11	.450	26	–	15	.634
Boston College	8	–	12	.400	20	–	16	.556
Notre Dame	7	–	13	.350	13	–	20	.394
Georgia Tech	7	–	13	.350	14	–	18	.438
Miami (FL)	6	–	14	.300	15	–	17	.469
Louisville	3	–	17	.150	8	–	24	.250
† 2024 ACC tournament winner Rankings from AP Poll

The 2023–24 Georgia Tech Yellow Jackets men's basketball team represented the Georgia Institute of Technology during the 2023–24 NCAA Division I men's basketball season. They were led by first-year head coach Damon Stoudamire and played their home games at Hank McCamish Pavilion as members of the Atlantic Coast Conference.

The Yellow Jackets started the season with two wins and two losses before completing two major upsets. They defeated twenty-first ranked Mississippi State in the ACC–SEC Challenge and seventh ranked Duke in their ACC opening game. They followed those upsets with a loss in their rivalry game to Georgia. From there, the team won four straight games including their first two games in the early season tournament, the Diamond Head Classic. Including the championship game of that tournament, the Yellow Jackets went on a five game losing streak. Duke defeated them while ranked eleventh in a rematch of their earlier game, and they pushed Notre Dame to over time, but could not prevail. An upset win over Clemson in double overtime broke the losing streak, but the team lost eight of their next nine games. The only win was over then third-ranked North Carolina. The Yellow Jackets finished the season well, winning four of their last six games. Their losses were to Clemson in a rematch of the previous upset and to Virginia on the final day of the season.

The Yellow Jackets finished the season 14–18 and 7–13 in ACC play to finish in a tie for twelfth place. As the thirteenth seed in the ACC tournament, they lost to thirteenth seed Notre Dame in the First Round. They were not invited to the NCAA tournament or the NIT.

== Previous season ==
The Yellow Jackets finished the 2022–23 season 15–18, 6–14 in ACC play to finish in 13th place. In the ACC tournament, they defeated Florida State before losing to Pittsburgh in the second round.

On March 10, 2023, the school fired head coach Josh Pastner. Three days later, the school named former Pacific head coach Damon Stoudamire the team's new head coach.

== Offseason ==
=== Departures ===
Departures
Name	Number	Pos.	Height	Weight	Year	Hometown	Reason for departure
Javon Franklin	4	F	6'7"	220	GS Senior	Little Rock, AR	Graduated
Deivon Smith	5	G	6'1"	172	Junior	Loganville, GA	Transferred to Utah
Cyril Martynov	10	F	6'11"	230	Freshman	Barrie, ON	Transferred to Eastern Michigan
Tristan Maxwell	11	G	6'2"	209	Junior	Huntersville, NC	Transferred to Hampton
Freds Bagatskis	12	F	6'8"	200	Freshman	Riga, Latvia	Transferred to UT Arlington
Jalon Moore	14	F	6'6"	211	Sophomore	Gardendale, AL	Transferred to Oklahoma
Jordan Meka	23	F	6'8"	225	Junior	Yaoundé, Cameroon	Entered Transfer Portal
Rodney Howard	24	C	6'10"	246	Senior	Ypsilanti, MI	Graduate transferred to Western Kentucky
Coleman Boyd	30	G	6'1"	178	Senior	Smyrna, GA	Walk-on; left the team for personal reasons
Brayden Daniels	33	G	6'4"	176	Sophomore	Louisville, KY	Walk-on; not on team roster
Jermontae Hill	43	F	6'6"	198	(redshirt) Freshman	Tucker, GA	Walk-on; Entered Transfer Portal

=== Incoming transfers ===
Incoming transfers
Name	Number	Pos.	Height	Weight	Year	Hometown	Previous school
Tafara Gapare	2	F	6'9"	185	Sophomore	Wellington, New Zealand	UMass
Carter Murphy	4	G	6'4"	200	GS Senior	Phoenix, AZ	Air Force
Ebenezer Dowuona	10	F	6'11"	225	Senior	Accra, Ghana	NC State
Tyzhaun Claude	12	F	6'8"	235	(redshirt) Junior	Goldsboro, NC	Western Carolina
Kowacie Reeves	14	G	6'6"	192	Junior	Macon, GA	Florida
Amaree Abram	24	G	6'4"	190	Sophomore	Port Arthur, TX	Ole Miss

=== Recruiting classes ===
==== 2023 recruiting class ====
College recruiting information
Name	Hometown	School	Height	Weight	Commit date
Baye Ndongo #48 C	Putman, CT	Putnam Science Academy	6 ft 9 in (2.06 m)	225 lb (102 kg)	May 19, 2023
Baye Ndongo #48 C	Recruit ratings: Rivals: 247Sports: ESPN: (79)				
Ibrahim Souare #53 C	Glendale, AZ	Dream City Christian	6 ft 8 in (2.03 m)	210 lb (95 kg)	Aug 15, 2023
Ibrahim Souare #53 C	Recruit ratings: Rivals: 247Sports: ESPN: (77)				
Ibrahima Sacko; SF	Markham, ON	J. Addison	6 ft 6 in (1.98 m)	222 lb (101 kg)	Jul 14, 2022
Ibrahima Sacko; SF	Recruit ratings: Rivals: 247Sports: ESPN: (NR)				
Nait George; PG	Glendale, AZ	Dream City Christian	6 ft 3 in (1.91 m)	180 lb (82 kg)	Aug 9, 2023
Nait George; PG	Recruit ratings: Rivals: 247Sports: ESPN: (NR)				
Overall recruit ranking:
Note: In many cases, Scout, Rivals, 247Sports, On3, and ESPN may conflict in their listings of height and weight.; In these cases, the average was taken. ESPN grades are on a 100-point scale.; Sources: "2023 Georgia Tech Commits". Rivals.; "Georgia Tech 2023 Basketball Commits". Scout.; "Georgia Tech Yellow Jackets". ESPN.; "Scout.com Team Recruiting Rankings". Scout.; "2023 Team Ranking". Rivals.

==== 2024 recruiting class ====
College recruiting information (2024)
Name	Hometown	School	Height	Weight	Commit date
Jaeden Mustaf #18 SG	Bowie, MD	Overtime Elite	6 ft 4 in (1.93 m)	195 lb (88 kg)	
Jaeden Mustaf #18 SG	Recruit ratings: Rivals: 247Sports: ESPN: (86)				
Cole Kirouac; PF	Cumming, GA	Brewster Academy	6 ft 10 in (2.08 m)	190 lb (86 kg)	
Cole Kirouac; PF	Recruit ratings: Rivals: 247Sports: ESPN: (NR)				
Overall recruit ranking:
Note: In many cases, Scout, Rivals, 247Sports, On3, and ESPN may conflict in their listings of height and weight.; In these cases, the average was taken. ESPN grades are on a 100-point scale.; Sources: "2024 Georgia Tech Commits". Rivals.; "Georgia Tech 2024 Basketball Commits". Scout.; "Georgia Tech Yellow Jackets". ESPN.; "Scout.com Team Recruiting Rankings". Scout.; "2024 Team Ranking". Rivals.

== Roster ==
2023–24 Georgia Tech Yellow Jackets men's basketball team
Players
Coaches

Pos.	#	Name	Height	Weight	Year	Previous school	Hometown
G	0	Lance Terry	6 ft 2 in (1.88 m)	198 lb (90 kg)	GS	The Heritage School; Gardner–Webb	College Park, GA
G	1	Kyle Sturdivant	6 ft 2 in (1.88 m)	195 lb (88 kg)	GS	Norcross HS; Southern California	Norcross, GA
G	2	Naithan George	6 ft 3 in (1.91 m)	180 lb (82 kg)	Fr	Dream City Christian School (AZ)	Toronto, ON
G	3	Dallan Coleman	6 ft 6 in (1.98 m)	210 lb (95 kg)	Jr	West Nassau HS	Memphis, TN
G	4	Carter Murphy	6 ft 4 in (1.93 m)	205 lb (93 kg)	GS	Arcadia HS; Air Force	Phoenix, AZ
F	5	Tafara Gapare	6 ft 9 in (2.06 m)	206 lb (93 kg)	So	South Kent School; UMass	Wellington, New Zealand
F	10	Ebenezer Dowuona	6 ft 11 in (2.11 m)	230 lb (104 kg)	Sr	The Heritage School (GA); NC State	Accra, Ghana
F	11	Baye Ndongo	6 ft 9 in (2.06 m)	214 lb (97 kg)	Fr	Putnam Science Academy (CT)	Mboro, Senegal
F	12	Tyzhaun Claude	6 ft 7 in (2.01 m)	226 lb (103 kg)	RS Sr	Moravian Prep; Western Carolina	Goldsboro, NC
G	13	Miles Kelly	6 ft 6 in (1.98 m)	180 lb (82 kg)	Jr	Parkview HS	Lilburn, GA
G	14	Kowacie Reeves	6 ft 7 in (2.01 m)	202 lb (92 kg)	Jr	Westside HS; Florida	Macon, GA
F	23	Ibrahima Sacko	6 ft 6 in (1.98 m)	225 lb (102 kg)	Fr	J. Addison School (ON)	Conakry, Guinea
G	24	Amaree Abram	6 ft 4 in (1.93 m)	195 lb (88 kg)	So	Southern California Academy; Ole Miss	Port Arthur, TX
F	30	Ibrahim Souare	6 ft 9 in (2.06 m)	214 lb (97 kg)	Fr	Dream City Christian School (AZ)	Conakry, Guinea
G	33	Marcos San Miguel (W)	6 ft 4 in (1.93 m)	190 lb (86 kg)	Fr	Campbell HS	Atlanta, GA
F	35	Emmer Nichols (W)	6 ft 6 in (1.98 m)	215 lb (98 kg)	RS Fr	Sacred Heart Prep School	Woodside, CA

Head coach

- Damon Stoudamire (Arizona)

Assistant coach(es)

- Karl Hobbs (Connecticut)
- Terry Parker Jr. (Louisiana Tech)
- Pershin Williams (North Florida)

Legend

- (C) Team captain
- (S) Suspended
- (I) Ineligible
- (W) Walk-on
- Injured
- Current redshirt

Roster

== Schedule and results ==
Date time, TV	Rank^{#}	Opponent^{#}	Result	Record	High points	High rebounds	High assists	Site (attendance) city, state
Exhibition
November 1, 2023*; 7:30 p.m.		Clark Atlanta	W 91–75	–	19 – Reeves	8 – Tied	11 – Sturdivant	McCamish Pavilion (3,244); Atlanta, GA
Regular season
November 6, 2023*; 7:30 p.m., ACCNX/ESPN+		Georgia Southern	W 84–62	1–0	25 – Kelly	10 – Claude	6 – Sturdivant	McCamish Pavilion (3,414); Atlanta, GA
November 9, 2023*; 7:30 p.m., ACCNX/ESPN+		Howard	W 88–85	2–0	27 – Kelly	7 – Reeves	3 – Tied	McCamish Pavilion (3,802); Atlanta, GA
November 14, 2023*; 7:30 p.m., ACCNX/ESPN+		UMass Lowell	L 71–74	2–1	24 – Coleman	9 – Claude	5 – Sturdivant	McCamish Pavilion (3,778); Atlanta, GA
November 22, 2023*; 7:00 p.m., ESPN+		at Cincinnati	L 54–89	2–2	14 – Reeves Jr.	8 – Ndongo	4 – Sturdivant	Fifth Third Arena (11,756); Cincinnati, OH
November 28, 2023*; 7:00 p.m., ACCN		No. 21 Mississippi State; ACC–SEC Challenge	W 67–59	3–2	22 – Kelly	12 – Kelly	3 – Ndongo	McCamish Pavilion (3,913); Atlanta, GA
December 2, 2023; 2:15 p.m., The CW		No. 7 Duke	W 72–68	4–2 (1–0)	21 – Ndongo	7 – Kelly	9 – George	McCamish Pavilion (7,758); Atlanta, GA
December 5, 2023*; 7:00 p.m., SECN		at Georgia; Rivalry	L 62–76	4–3	12 – Tied	11 – Ndongo	4 – Kelly	Stegeman Coliseum (9,017); Athens, GA
December 9, 2023*; 4:00 p.m., ACCN		Alabama A&M	W 70–49	5–3	20 – Reeves	10 – Reeves	8 – George	McCamish Pavilion (3,919); Atlanta, GA
December 16, 2023*; 12:00 p.m., BTN		vs. Penn State	W 82–81 ^{OT}	6–3	20 – Gapare	19 – Ndongo	8 – George	Madison Square Garden; New York, NY
December 21, 2023*; 9:00 p.m., ESPN2		vs. UMass; Diamond Head Classic Quarterfinals	W 73–70	7–3	21 – Sturdivant	9 – Claude	5 – George	Stan Sheriff Center (5,290); Honolulu, HI
December 22, 2023*; 11:00 p.m., ESPN2		at Hawai'i; Diamond Head Classic Semifinals	W 73–68	8–3	22 – Ndongo	12 – Ndongo	5 – Sturdivant	Stan Sheriff Center; Honolulu, HI
December 24, 2023*; 9:00 p.m., ESPN		vs. Nevada; Diamond Head Classic Championship Game	L 64–72	8–4	20 – Ndongo	8 – Ndongo	3 – Kelly	Stan Sheriff Center (5,005); Honolulu, HI
January 3, 2023; 7:00 p.m., ACCN		at Florida State	L 71–82	8–5 (1–1)	20 – Kelly	9 – Ndongo	5 – Sturdivant	Donald L. Tucker Civic Center (4,248); Tallahassee, FL
January 6, 2024; 4:00 p.m., ESPN2		Boston College	L 87–95	8–6 (1–2)	18 – Ndongo	10 – Tied	9 – Sturdivant	McCamish Pavilion (5,052); Atlanta, Ga
January 9, 2024; 9:00 p.m., ACCN		Notre Dame	L 68–75 ^{OT}	8–7 (1–3)	25 – Kelly	9 – Ndongo	11 – George	McCamish Pavilion (3,729); Atlanta, GA
January 13, 2024; 5:00 p.m., ACCN		at No. 11т Duke	L 79–84	8–8 (1–4)	17 – George	11 – Kelly	5 – George	Cameron Indoor Stadium (9,314); Durham, NC
January 16, 2024; 9:00 p.m., ACCN		at Clemson	W 93–90 ^{2OT}	9–8 (2–4)	20 – George	10 – Ndongo	6 – George	Littlejohn Coliseum (7,217); Clemson, SC
January 20, 2023; 6:00 p.m., ACCN		Virginia	L 66–75	9–9 (2–5)	15 – Tied	5 – Tied	9 – George	McCamish Pavilion (6,380); Atlanta, GA
January 23, 2023; 7:00 p.m., ESPNU		Pittsburgh	L 64–72	9–10 (2–6)	17 – Ndongo	8 – Ndongo	4 – George	McCamish Pavilion (3,612); Atlanta, GA
January 27, 2023; 5:00 p.m., ACCN		at Virginia Tech	L 67–91	9–11 (2–7)	16 – Ndongo	9 – Ndongo	8 – George	Cassell Coliseum (8,925); Blacksburg, VA
January 30, 2024; 7:00 p.m., ESPN		No. 3 North Carolina	W 74–73	10–11 (3–7)	18 – Sturdivant	8 – Tied	4 – Tied	McCamish Pavilion (8,600); Atlanta, GA
February 3, 2024; 5:30 p.m., The CW		at NC State	L 76–82	10–12 (3–8)	20 – Kelly	10 – Kelly	5 – George	PNC Arena (15,523); Raleigh, NC
February 6, 2024; 7:00 p.m., ESPNU		Wake Forest	L 51–80	10–13 (3–9)	14 – Ndongo	6 – Ndongo	7 – George	McCamish Pavilion (4,239); Atlanta, GA
February 10, 2024; 6:30 p.m., ACCN		at Louisville	L 67–79	10–14 (3–10)	36 – Kelly	9 – Claude	3 – Tied	KFC Yum! Center (11,891); Louisville, KY
February 14, 2024; 7:00 p.m., ACCN		at Notre Dame	L 55–58	10–15 (3–11)	13 – Sacko	6 – Reeves Jr.	4 – Tied	Joyce Center (4,589); South Bend, IN
February 17, 2024; 5:30 p.m., The CW		Syracuse	W 65–60	11–15 (4–11)	17 – Sturdivant	11 – Ndongo	4 – Sturdivant	McCamish Pavilion (6,241); Atlanta, GA
February 21, 2024; 7:00 p.m., ACCN		Clemson	L 57–81	11–16 (4–12)	14 – Sturdivant	7 – Tied	7 – Sacko	McCamish Pavilion (4,567); Atlanta, GA
February 24, 2024; 4:00 p.m., ACCN		at Miami (FL)	W 80–76	12–16 (5–12)	25 – Kelly	8 – Reeves Jr.	7 – Sturdivant	Watsco Center (7,906); Coral Gables, FL
March 2, 2024; 12:00 p.m., ESPN2		Florida State	W 85–76	13–16 (6–12)	20 – Sturdivant	14 – Ndongo	4 – Tied	McCamish Pavilion (5,908); Atlanta, GA
March 5, 2024; 9:00 p.m., ACCN		at Wake Forest	W 70–69	14–16 (7–12)	19 – Kelly	11 – Ndongo	3 – George	LVJM Coliseum (7,481); Winston-Salem, NC
March 9, 2024; 8:00 p.m., ACCN		at Virginia	L 57–72	14–17 (7–13)	21 – Ndongo	9 – Ndongo	5 – George	John Paul Jones Arena (13,877); Charlottesville, VA
ACC tournament
March 12, 2024; 2:00 p.m., ACCN	(13)	vs. (12) Notre Dame; First Round	L 80–84	14–18	24 – George	7 – Ndongo	7 – George	Capital One Arena (7,523); Washington, D.C.
*Non-conference game. ^{#}Rankings from AP Poll. (#) Tournament seedings in parentheses. All times are in Eastern Time.

== Rankings ==
Ranking movements Legend: ██ Increase in ranking ██ Decrease in ranking — = Not ranked RV = Received votes
	Week																				
Poll	Pre	1	2	3	4	5	6	7	8	9	10	11	12	13	14	15	16	17	18	19	Final
AP	—	—	—	—	RV	—	—	—	—	—	—	—	—	—	—	—	—	—	—	—	—
Coaches	—	—	—	—	—	—	—	—	—	—	—	—	—	—	—	—	—	—	—	—	—
