= 2023–24 Boston College Eagles men's basketball team =

American college basketball season

2023–24 Boston College Eagles men's basketball

NIT, Second Round
- Conference: Atlantic Coast Conference
- Record: 20–16 (8–12 ACC)
- Head coach: Earl Grant (3rd season)
- Assistant coaches: Anthony Goins; Corey McCrae; Jim Molinari
- Home arena: Conte Forum

2023–24 ACC men's basketball standings
| | Conf. | | | | Overall |
| Team | W | | L | PCT | W | | L | PCT |
|---|---|---|---|---|---|---|---|---|
| No. 7 North Carolina | 17 | – | 3 | .850 | 29 | – | 8 | .784 |
| No. 9 Duke | 15 | – | 5 | .750 | 27 | – | 9 | .750 |
| Virginia | 13 | – | 7 | .650 | 23 | – | 11 | .676 |
| Pittsburgh | 12 | – | 8 | .600 | 22 | – | 11 | .667 |
| Wake Forest | 11 | – | 9 | .550 | 21 | – | 14 | .600 |
| No. 14 Clemson | 11 | – | 9 | .550 | 24 | – | 12 | .667 |
| Syracuse | 11 | – | 9 | .550 | 20 | – | 12 | .625 |
| Virginia Tech | 10 | – | 10 | .500 | 19 | – | 15 | .559 |
| Florida State | 10 | – | 10 | .500 | 17 | – | 16 | .515 |
| No. 10 NC State † | 9 | – | 11 | .450 | 26 | – | 15 | .634 |
| Boston College | 8 | – | 12 | .400 | 20 | – | 16 | .556 |
| Notre Dame | 7 | – | 13 | .350 | 13 | – | 20 | .394 |
| Georgia Tech | 7 | – | 13 | .350 | 14 | – | 18 | .438 |
| Miami (FL) | 6 | – | 14 | .300 | 15 | – | 17 | .469 |
| Louisville | 3 | – | 17 | .150 | 8 | – | 24 | .250 |
† 2024 ACC tournament winner Rankings from AP Poll

The 2023–24 Boston College Eagles men's basketball team represented Boston College during the 2023–24 NCAA Division I men's basketball season. The Eagles, led by third-year head coach Earl Grant, played their home games at the Conte Forum as members of the Atlantic Coast Conference.

The Eagles started the season with four straight wins, including a win over rivals Harvard. However, their fortunes changed as they entered their early-season tournament, the Hall of Fame Classic. The team lost both of their games in the tournament before defeating Vanderbilt in the ACC–SEC Challenge. They had an overtime loss to NC State to open their ACC season, before winning their remaining four non-conference games. They won two of their next five ACC games, including a loss at twenty-first ranked Clemson. The team then went on a streak of losing two games, followed by winning two games for eight total games. Losses in this streak included fourth-ranked North Carolina and ninth-ranked Duke. The Eagles finished the ACC regular season with four straight losses followed by two wins.

The Eagles finished the season 20–16, 8–12 in ACC play to finish in eleventh place. As the eleventh seed the ACC tournament, they defeated Miami in the First Round, and Clemson in the Second Round before losing to Virginia in the Quarterfinals. They received an at-large bid to the National Invitation Tournament as an un-seeded team. They defeated third-seed Providence in the First Round before losing at UNLV in the Second Round to end their season.

== Previous season ==
The Eagles finished the 2022–23 season 16–17, 9–11 in ACC play to finish in 10th place. In the ACC tournament, they defeated Louisville before losing to North Carolina in the second round.

== Offseason ==
=== Departures ===
Departures
| Name | Number | Pos. | Height | Weight | Year | Hometown | Reason for departure |
|---|---|---|---|---|---|---|---|
| T. J. Bickerstaff | 1 | F | 6'9" | 220 | Senior | Atlanta, GA | Graduate transferred to James Madison |
| DeMarr Langford Jr. | 5 | G | 6'5" | 210 | Junior | Worcester, MA | Transferred to UCF |
| Makai Ashton-Langford | 11 | G | 6'3" | 185 | GS Senior | Worcester, MA | Graduated |
| Andrew Kenny | 23 | F | 6'6" | 200 | Senior | Seattle, WA | Walk-on; graduate transferred |
| CJ Penha | 24 | F | 6'7" | 220 | GS Senior | Pickerington, OH | Graduated |
| Jonathan Noel | 25 | G | 6'3' | 205 | Senior | Everett, MA | Walk-on; graduate transferred |
| Quinn Pemberton | 30 | G | 6'1" | 210 | Junior | Lake Forest, IL | Walk-on; transferred to Elmhurst University |

=== Incoming transfers ===
Boston College incoming transfers
| Name | Number | Pos. | Height | Weight | Year | Hometown | Previous school |
|---|---|---|---|---|---|---|---|
| Claudell Harris Jr. | 1 | G | 6'3" | 190 | Junior | Hahnville, LA | Charleston Southern |

=== 2023 recruiting class ===
College recruiting information
| Name | Hometown | School | Height | Weight | Commit date |
|---|---|---|---|---|---|
| Jayden Hastings #40 C | Orlando, FL | IMG Academy | 6 ft 9 in (2.06 m) | 210 lb (95 kg) | Oct 20, 2022 |
| Jayden Hastings #40 C | Recruit ratings: Rivals: 247Sports: ESPN: (81) | | | | |
| Fred Payne #35 PG | Spring, TX | Legacy The School of Sport Sciences | 6 ft 3 in (1.91 m) | 170 lb (77 kg) | May 24, 2022 |
| Fred Payne #35 PG | Recruit ratings: Rivals: 247Sports: ESPN: (80) | | | | |
| Elijah Strong; PF | Charlotte, NC | Myers Park High School | 6 ft 8 in (2.03 m) | 245 lb (111 kg) | Apr 20, 2023 |
| Elijah Strong; PF | Recruit ratings: Rivals: 247Sports: ESPN: (NR) | | | | |
Overall recruit ranking:
Note: In many cases, Scout, Rivals, 247Sports, On3, and ESPN may conflict in their listings of height and weight.; In these cases, the average was taken. ESPN grades are on a 100-point scale.; Sources: "Boston College Eagles". Rivals.; "Boston College 2023 Basketball Commits". Scout.; "Boston College Eagles". ESPN.; "Scout.com Team Recruiting Rankings". Scout.; "2023 Team Ranking". Rivals.

=== 2024 Recruiting class ===
College recruiting information (2024)
| Name | Hometown | School | Height | Weight | Commit date |
|---|---|---|---|---|---|
| Luka Toews; PG | Boston, MA | The Newman School | 6 ft 1 in (1.85 m) | 155 lb (70 kg) | Jul 16, 2023 |
| Luka Toews; PG | Recruit ratings: Rivals: 247Sports: ESPN: (NR) | | | | |
| Nick Petronio; PG | Milton, MA | Milton Academy | 6 ft 3 in (1.91 m) | 170 lb (77 kg) | Mar 24, 2023 |
| Nick Petronio; PG | Recruit ratings: Rivals: 247Sports: ESPN: (NR) | | | | |
Overall recruit ranking:
Note: In many cases, Scout, Rivals, 247Sports, On3, and ESPN may conflict in their listings of height and weight.; In these cases, the average was taken. ESPN grades are on a 100-point scale.; Sources: "Boston College Eagles". Rivals.; "Boston College 2024 Basketball Commits". Scout.; "Boston College Eagles". ESPN.; "Scout.com Team Recruiting Rankings". Scout.; "2024 Team Ranking". Rivals.

== Roster ==
2023–24 Boston College Eagles men's basketball team
Players
Coaches

| Pos. | # | Name | Height | Weight | Year | Previous school | Hometown |
|---|---|---|---|---|---|---|---|
| G | 00 | Chas Kelley III | 6 ft 5 in (1.96 m) | 180 lb (82 kg) | So | The Phelps School | Houston, Texas |
| G | 1 | Claudell Harris Jr. | 6 ft 3 in (1.91 m) | 190 lb (86 kg) | Jr | Charleston Southern | Hahnville, Louisiana |
| C | 2 | Armani Mighty | 6 ft 10 in (2.08 m) | 225 lb (102 kg) | So | United Scholastic Academy | Toronto, Ontario |
| G | 3 | Jaeden Zackery | 6 ft 2 in (1.88 m) | 215 lb (98 kg) | Jr | Chipola College | Salem, Wisconsin |
| G | 4 | Abe Atiyeh (W) | 6 ft 0 in (1.83 m) | 195 lb (88 kg) | Sr | Moravian Academy | Bethlehem, Pennsylvania |
| G | 5 | Fred Payne | 6 ft 2 in (1.88 m) | 180 lb (82 kg) | Fr | Legacy the School of Sport Sciences | Grambling, Louisiana |
| G/F | 10 | Prince Aligbe | 6 ft 7 in (2.01 m) | 225 lb (102 kg) | So | Minnehaha Academy | Minneapolis, Minnesota |
| F | 12 | Quinten Post | 7 ft 0 in (2.13 m) | 250 lb (113 kg) | GS | Mississippi State | Amsterdam, Netherlands |
| G | 13 | Donald Hand Jr. | 6 ft 5 in (1.96 m) | 195 lb (88 kg) | RS Fr | Landstown | Virginia Beach, Virginia |
| F | 21 | Devin McGlockton | 6 ft 7 in (2.01 m) | 215 lb (98 kg) | RS So | South Forsyth | Cumming, Georgia |
| F | 22 | Jayden Hastings | 6 ft 9 in (2.06 m) | 225 lb (102 kg) | Fr | IMG Academy | Orlando, Florida |
| F | 31 | Elijah Strong | 6 ft 8 in (2.03 m) | 245 lb (111 kg) | Fr | Myers Park | Charlotte, North Carolina |
| G | 45 | Mason Madsen | 6 ft 4 in (1.93 m) | 195 lb (88 kg) | Sr | Cincinnati | Rochester, Minnesota |

Head coach

- Earl Grant (Georgia College)

Assistant coach(es)

- Anthony Goins (St. John's)
- Corey McCrae (Wagner)
- Jim Molinari (Illinois Wesleyan)

Legend

- (C) Team captain
- (S) Suspended
- (I) Ineligible
- (W) Walk-on
- Injured
- Current redshirt

Roster

== Schedule and results ==
| Date time, TV | Rank^{#} | Opponent^{#} | Result | Record | High points | High rebounds | High assists | Site (attendance) city, state |
Regular season
| November 6, 2023*; 8:00 p.m., ACCNX/ESPN+ | | Fairfield | W 89–70 | 1–0 | 31 – Post | 11 – Post | 4 – Zackery | Conte Forum (4,736); Chestnut Hill, MA |
| November 10, 2023*; 7:00 p.m., ESPN+ | | at The Citadel | W 75–71 | 2–0 | 21 – Zackery | 5 – Mighty | 4 – Tied | McAlister Field House (3,337); Charleston, SC |
| November 15, 2023*; 7:00 p.m., ACCNX/ESPN+ | | Richmond | W 68–61 | 3–0 | 17 – Post | 10 – Tied | 5 – Post | Conte Forum (3,886); Chestnut Hill, MA |
| November 18, 2023*; 2:00 p.m., ACCNX/ESPN+ | | Harvard; Rivalry | W 73–64 | 4–0 | 20 – Post | 19 – Post | 5 – Zackery | Conte Forum (6,326); Chestnut Hill, MA |
| November 22, 2023*; 1:30 p.m., CBSSN | | vs. Colorado State; Hall of Fame Classic semifinals | L 74–86 | 4–1 | 22 – Post | 5 – McGlockton | 5 – Zackery | T-Mobile Center; Kansas City, MO |
| November 23, 2023*; 1:30 p.m., CBSSN | | vs. Loyola Chicago; Hall of Fame Classic consolation game | L 68–71 | 4–2 | 25 – Post | 9 – Post | 4 – Zackery | T-Mobile Center; Kansas City, MO |
| November 29, 2023*; 9:15 p.m., SECN | | at Vanderbilt; ACC–SEC Challenge | W 80–62 | 5–2 | 24 – Post | 8 – McGlockton | 8 – Zackery | Memorial Gymnasium (5,516); Nashville, TN |
| December 2, 2023; 4:00 p.m., ACCN | | NC State | L 78–84 ^{OT} | 5–3 (0–1) | 20 – Zackery | 9 – McGlockton | 4 – Zackery | Conte Forum (5,249); Chestnut Hill, MA |
| December 5, 2023*; 6:00 p.m., ACCN | | Central Connecticut | W 82–68 | 6–3 | 16 – Hand Jr. | 7 – Madsen | 6 – Zackery | Conte Forum (3,118); Chestnut Hill, MA |
| December 8, 2023*; 7:00 p.m., ACCNX/ESPN+ | | Holy Cross | W 95–64 | 7–3 | 18 – Zackery | 10 – Post | 7 – Post | Conte Forum (4,866); Chestnut Hill, MA |
| December 10, 2023*; 4:30 p.m., ESPNU | | vs. St. John's; NABC Brooklyn Showcase | W 86–80 | 8–3 | 14 – Tied | 11 – Post | 9 – Post | Barclays Center; Brooklyn, NY |
| December 21, 2023*; 6:00 p.m., ACCNX/ESPN+ | | Lehigh | W 85–69 | 9–3 | 29 – Harris Jr. | 10 – McGlockton | 4 – Tied | Conte Forum (5,042); Chestnut Hill, MA |
| January 2, 2024; 7:00 p.m., ACCN | | Wake Forest | L 78–84 | 9–4 (0–2) | 20 – Post | 9 – McGlockton | 5 – Harris Jr. | Conte Forum (4,265); Chestnut Hill, MA |
| January 6, 2024; 4:00 p.m., ESPN2 | | Georgia Tech | W 95–87 | 10–4 (1–2) | 30 – McGlockton | 5 – Tied | 7 – Post | Conte Forum (5,052); Chestnut Hill, MA |
| January 10, 2024; 9:00 p.m., ACCN | | at Syracuse | L 59–69 | 10–5 (1–3) | 16 – Harris Jr. | 14 – McGlockton | 3 – Kelley III | JMA Wireless Dome (17,331); Syracuse, NY |
| January 13, 2024; 3:00 p.m., ACCN | | at No. 21 Clemson | L 78–89 | 10–6 (1–4) | 18 – Zackery | 5 – Tied | 6 – Zackery | Littlejohn Coliseum (8,708); Clemson, SC |
| January 15, 2024; 7:00 p.m., ESPNU | | Notre Dame | W 63–59 | 11–6 (2–4) | 20 – Zackery | 8 – McGlockton | 3 – Zackery | Conte Forum (6,348); Chestnut Hill, MA |
| January 20, 2024; 2:15 p.m., The CW | | No. 4 North Carolina | L 66–76 | 11–7 (2–5) | 19 – Post | 10 – Post | 4 – Zackery | Conte Forum (8,606); Chestnut Hill, MA |
| January 23, 2024; 9:00 p.m., ACCN | | at Virginia Tech | L 71–76 | 11–8 (2–6) | 19 – McGlockton | 10 – McGlockton | 7 – Zackery | Cassell Coliseum (8,925); Blacksburg, VA |
| January 27, 2024; 12:00 p.m., ESPNU | | at Notre Dame | W 61–58 | 12–8 (3–6) | 15 – McGlockton | 6 – Tied | 3 – Madsen | Joyce Center (6,593); South Bend, IN |
| January 30, 2024; 7:00 p.m., ACCN | | Syracuse | W 80–75 | 13–8 (4–6) | 19 – Harris Jr. | 12 – Post | 4 – Tied | Conte Forum (6,611); Chestnut Hill, MA |
| February 6, 2024; 7:00 p.m., ACCN | | Florida State | L 62–63 | 13–9 (4–7) | 21 – Post | 12 – Post | 5 – Zackery | Conte Forum (4,390); Chestnut Hill, MA |
| February 10, 2024; 2:00 p.m., ESPN | | at No. 9 Duke | L 65–80 | 13–10 (4–8) | 15 – Madsen | 9 – Post | 4 – Post | Cameron Indoor Stadium (9,314); Durham, NC |
| February 13, 2024; 9:00 p.m., ACCN | | Louisville | W 89–77 | 14–10 (5–8) | 20 – Harris Jr. | 6 – Post | 6 – Zackery | Conte Forum (3,459); Chestnut Hill, MA |
| February 17, 2024; 4:00 p.m., ACCN | | Miami (FL) | W 85–77 | 15–10 (6–8) | 25 – Madsen | 10 – McGlockton | 7 – Zackery | Conte Forum (8,606); Chestnut Hill, MA |
| February 20, 2024; 7:00 p.m., ACCN | | at Florida State | L 76–84 | 15–11 (6–9) | 19 – Zackery | 7 – Post | 5 – Tied | Donald L. Tucker Civic Center (6,009); Tallahassee, FL |
| February 24, 2024; 2:00 p.m., ACCN | | at NC State | L 70–81 | 15–12 (6–10) | 21 – Madsen | 9 – Post | 3 – Post | PNC Arena (14,642); Raleigh, NC |
| February 28, 2024; 9:00 p.m., ESPNU | | Virginia | L 68–72 | 15–13 (6–11) | 24 – Post | 10 – Post | 4 – Tied | Conte Forum (4,851); Chestnut Hill, MA |
| March 2, 2024; 6:00 p.m., ACCN | | Pittsburgh | L 65–90 | 15–14 (6–12) | 30 – Post | 12 – Post | 3 – Tied | Conte Forum (7,536); Chestnut Hill, MA |
| March 6, 2024; 7:00 p.m., ESPNU | | at Miami (FL) | W 67–57 | 16–14 (7–12) | 19 – Post | 9 – Tied | 5 – Zackery | Watsco Center (7,372); Coral Gables, FL |
| March 9, 2024; 5:30 p.m., The CW | | at Louisville | W 67–61 | 17–14 (8–12) | 18 – Harris Jr. | 8 – Tied | 6 – Zackery | KFC Yum! Center (11,615); Louisville, KY |
ACC tournament
| March 12, 2024; 7:00 p.m., ACCN | (11) | vs. (14) Miami (FL); First Round | W 81–65 | 18–14 | 30 – Post | 13 – Post | 3 – Tied | Capital One Arena (7,523); Washington, D.C. |
| March 13, 2024; 9:30 p.m., ESPNU | (11) | vs. (6) Clemson; Second round | W 76–55 | 19–14 | 27 – Harris Jr. | 8 – Post | 7 – Post | Capital One Arena (13,445); Washington, D.C. |
| March 14, 2024; 9:30 p.m., ESPN | (11) | vs. (3) Virginia; Quarterfinals | L 60–66 ^{OT} | 19–15 | 23 – Post | 13 – Post | 5 – Zackery | Capital One Arena (17,627); Washington, D.C. |
NIT
| March 19, 2024; 7:00 p.m., ESPNU | | at (3) Providence; First Round - Seton Hall Bracket | W 62–57 | 20–15 | 17 – Harris Jr. | 9 – McGlockton | 5 – Zackery | Amica Mutual Pavilion (6,507); Providnece, RI |
| March 24, 2024; 9:30 p.m., ESPNU | | at UNLV; Second Round - Seton Hall Bracket | L 70–79 | 20–16 | 22 – Post | 9 – Post | 5 – McGlockton | Thomas & Mack Center (5,543); Las Vegas, NV |
*Non-conference game. ^{#}Rankings from AP Poll. (#) Tournament seedings in parentheses. All times are in Eastern Time.

== Rankings ==
Ranking movements Legend: — = Not ranked
| | Week | | | | | | | | | | | | | | | | | | | | |
| Poll | Pre | 1 | 2 | 3 | 4 | 5 | 6 | 7 | 8 | 9 | 10 | 11 | 12 | 13 | 14 | 15 | 16 | 17 | 18 | 19 | Final |
|---|---|---|---|---|---|---|---|---|---|---|---|---|---|---|---|---|---|---|---|---|---|
| AP | — | — | — | — | — | — | — | — | — | — | — | — | — | — | — | — | — | — | — | — | — |
| Coaches | — | — | — | — | — | — | — | — | — | — | — | — | — | — | — | — | — | — | — | — | — |

*AP does not release post-NCAA tournament rankings.
