= 2023–24 Syracuse Orange men's basketball team =

American college basketball season

2023–24 Syracuse Orange men's basketball
- Conference: Atlantic Coast Conference
- Record: 20–12 (11–9 ACC)
- Head coach: Adrian Autry (1st season)
- Associate head coach: Gerry McNamara
- Assistant coaches: Allen Griffin; Brenden Straughn
- Offensive scheme: Ball-Screen Motion
- Base defense: Man-to-Man
- Home arena: JMA Wireless Dome

2023–24 ACC men's basketball standings
| | Conf. | | | | Overall |
| Team | W | | L | PCT | W | | L | PCT |
|---|---|---|---|---|---|---|---|---|
| No. 7 North Carolina | 17 | – | 3 | .850 | 29 | – | 8 | .784 |
| No. 9 Duke | 15 | – | 5 | .750 | 27 | – | 9 | .750 |
| Virginia | 13 | – | 7 | .650 | 23 | – | 11 | .676 |
| Pittsburgh | 12 | – | 8 | .600 | 22 | – | 11 | .667 |
| Wake Forest | 11 | – | 9 | .550 | 21 | – | 14 | .600 |
| No. 14 Clemson | 11 | – | 9 | .550 | 24 | – | 12 | .667 |
| Syracuse | 11 | – | 9 | .550 | 20 | – | 12 | .625 |
| Virginia Tech | 10 | – | 10 | .500 | 19 | – | 15 | .559 |
| Florida State | 10 | – | 10 | .500 | 17 | – | 16 | .515 |
| No. 10 NC State † | 9 | – | 11 | .450 | 26 | – | 15 | .634 |
| Boston College | 8 | – | 12 | .400 | 20 | – | 16 | .556 |
| Notre Dame | 7 | – | 13 | .350 | 13 | – | 20 | .394 |
| Georgia Tech | 7 | – | 13 | .350 | 14 | – | 18 | .438 |
| Miami (FL) | 6 | – | 14 | .300 | 15 | – | 17 | .469 |
| Louisville | 3 | – | 17 | .150 | 8 | – | 24 | .250 |
† 2024 ACC tournament winner Rankings from AP Poll

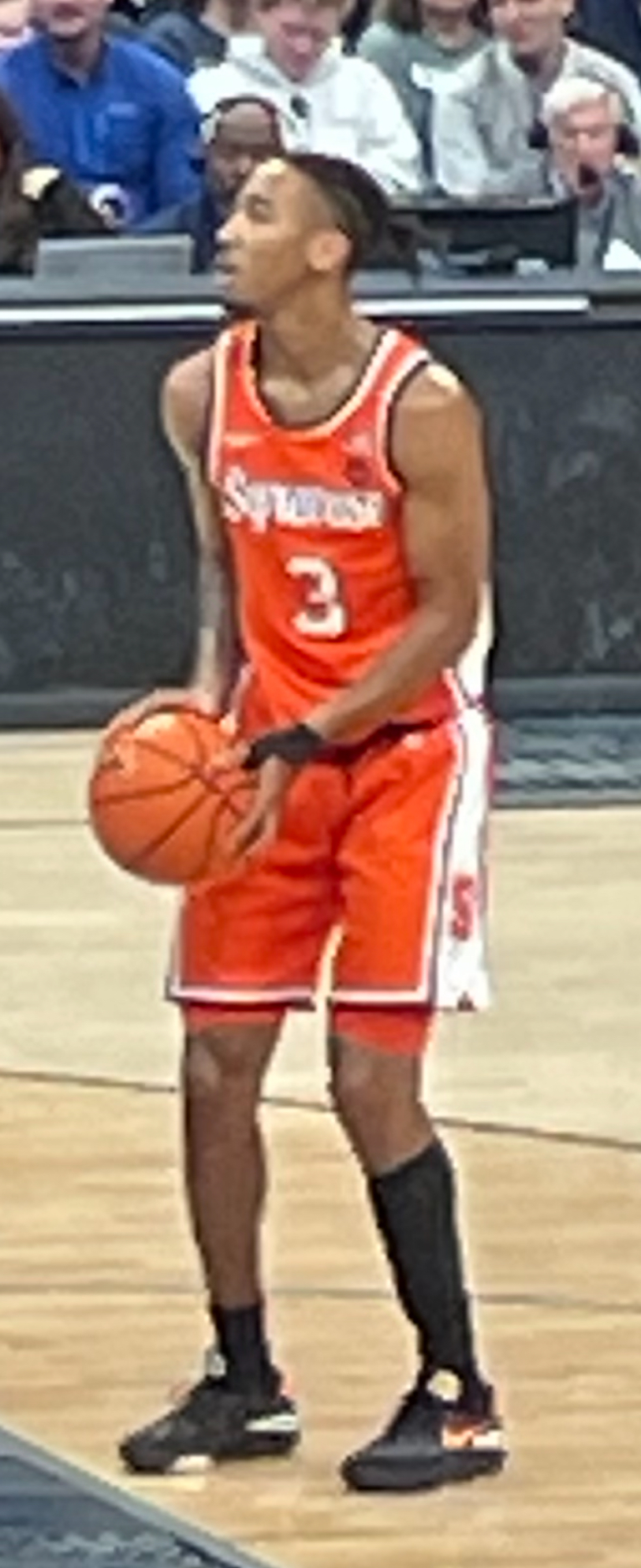
Judah Mintz taking a free-throw during a December 2023 game against the Georgetown Hoyas.

The 2023–24 Syracuse Orange men's basketball team represented Syracuse University during the 2023–24 NCAA Division I men's basketball season. The Orange were led by first-year head coach Adrian Autry and played their home games at JMA Wireless Dome in Syracuse, New York as eleventh-year members of the Atlantic Coast Conference. The Syracuse Orange men's basketball team drew an average home attendance of 20,288 in 2023-24, the 2nd highest in college basketball.

The Orange won their first three games of the season before participating in the Maui Invitational. They lost the first two games of the tournament against seventh-ranked Tennessee and eleventh-ranked Gonzaga. They finished the tournament with a win against Chaminade. They followed that with an ACC–SEC Challenge win against LSU before losing their ACC opener to Virginia. The Orange won their final four non-conference games to finish with a non-conference record of 9–2. Syracuse won four of its next six ACC games, including two wins against Pittsburgh and the only losses coming against fourteenth-ranked Duke and seventh-ranked North Carolina. The Orange weren't able to carry that momentum forward, as they lost four of their next six games. They rebounded to end their season, winning five of their last seven games, including an upset win over seventh-ranked North Carolina. They completed a season sweep of NC State but ended the season with a loss as they were beaten by Clemson for the second time in the season.

The Orange finished the 2023–24 season 20–12 and 11–9 in ACC play to finish in a three-way tie for fifth place. Syracuse lost the tiebreaker and was the seventh seed in the ACC tournament. They faced tenth-seed NC State for the third time this season in the Second Round and NC State avenged both regular season losses by defeating the Orange 83–65. They were not invited to the NCAA tournament and they were eligible to participate in the NIT Tournament, but they opted not to participate.

== Previous season ==
The Orange finished the 2022–23 season 17–15, 10–10 in ACC play to finish in a tie for eighth place. As the eighth seed in the ACC tournament, they lost to Wake Forest in the second round. This was the second year in a row that Syracuse did not qualify for any post season tournament, a first in then coach Jim Boeheim's 47 year tenure.

== Offseason ==
=== Departures ===
Departures
| Name | Number | Pos. | Height | Weight | Year | Hometown | Reason for departure |
|---|---|---|---|---|---|---|---|
| John Bol Ajak | 2 | F | 6'10" | 216 | (redshirt) Junior | Natinga, South Sudan | Entered Transfer Portal |
| Symir Torrence | 10 | G | 6'3" | 195 | Senior | Syracuse, NY | Graduate transferred to Binghamton |
| Joseph Girard III | 11 | G | 6'1" | 190 | Senior | Glens Falls, NY | Graduate transferred to Clemson |
| Jesse Edwards | 14 | C | 6'11" | 230 | Senior | Amsterdam, Netherlands | Graduate transferred to West Virginia |
| Shane Feldman | 25 | G | 6'2" | 165 | (redshirt) Junior | Agoura Hills, CA | Walk-on; left the team for personal reasons |
| Arthur Cordes | 33 | G | 6'3" | 180 | Junior | Wallingford, CT | Walk-on; left the team for personal reasons |

=== Incoming transfers ===
Incoming transfers
| Name | Number | Pos. | Height | Weight | Year | Hometown | Previous school |
|---|---|---|---|---|---|---|---|
| Kyle Cuffe Jr. | 0 | G | 6'2" | 180 | (redshirt) Sophomore | New York, NY | Kansas |
| JJ Starling | 2 | G | 6'4" | 200 | Sophomore | Baldwinsville, NY | Notre Dame |
| Naheem McLeod | 10 | C | 7'4" | 255 | Junior | Philadelphia, PA | Florida State |
| Chance Westry | 11 | G | 6'6" | 190 | Sophomore | Harrisburg, PA | Auburn |

=== 2023 recruiting class ===
College recruiting information
| Name | Hometown | School | Height | Weight | Commit date |
|---|---|---|---|---|---|
| William Patterson; C | Cumberland, MD | Bishop Walsh School | 7 ft 2 in (2.18 m) | 220 lb (100 kg) | Feb 20, 2023 |
| William Patterson; C | Recruit ratings: Rivals: 247Sports: ESPN: (NR) | | | | |
Overall recruit ranking:
Note: In many cases, Scout, Rivals, 247Sports, On3, and ESPN may conflict in their listings of height and weight.; In these cases, the average was taken. ESPN grades are on a 100-point scale.; Sources: "2023 Syracuse Signees". Rivals.; "2023 Syracuse Signees". Scout.; "2023 Syracuse Signees". ESPN.; "Scout.com Team Recruiting Rankings". Scout.; "2023 Team Ranking". Rivals.

=== 2024 recruiting class ===
College recruiting information (2024)
| Name | Hometown | School | Height | Weight | Commit date |
|---|---|---|---|---|---|
| Donavan Freeman #13 PF | Washington, DC | IMG Academy | 6 ft 7 in (2.01 m) | 190 lb (86 kg) | May 11, 2023 |
| Donavan Freeman #13 PF | Recruit ratings: Rivals: 247Sports: ESPN: (87) | | | | |
| Elijah Moore #50 SG | Bronx, NY | Cardinal Hayes High School | 6 ft 4 in (1.93 m) | 175 lb (79 kg) | Jan 27, 2023 |
| Elijah Moore #50 SG | Recruit ratings: Rivals: 247Sports: ESPN: (80) | | | | |
Overall recruit ranking:
Note: In many cases, Scout, Rivals, 247Sports, On3, and ESPN may conflict in their listings of height and weight.; In these cases, the average was taken. ESPN grades are on a 100-point scale.; Sources: "2024 Syracuse Signees". Rivals.; "2024 Syracuse Signees". Scout.; "2024 Syracuse Signees". ESPN.; "Scout.com Team Recruiting Rankings". Scout.; "2024 Team Ranking". Rivals.

== Roster ==
2023–24 Syracuse Orange men's basketball team
Players
Coaches

| Pos. | # | Name | Height | Weight | Year | Previous school | Hometown |
|---|---|---|---|---|---|---|---|
| G | 0 | Kyle Cuffe Jr. | 6 ft 2 in (1.88 m) | 190 lb (86 kg) | RS So | Blair Academy; Kansas | Harlem, New York |
| F | 1 | Maliq Brown | 6 ft 8 in (2.03 m) | 222 lb (101 kg) | So | Blue Ridge School | Culpeper, Virginia |
| G | 2 | JJ Starling | 6 ft 4 in (1.93 m) | 206 lb (93 kg) | So | La Lumiere; Notre Dame | Baldwinsville, New York |
| G | 3 | Judah Mintz | 6 ft 3 in (1.91 m) | 178 lb (81 kg) | So | Oak Hill Academy | Fort Washington, Maryland |
| F | 4 | Chris Bell | 6 ft 7 in (2.01 m) | 188 lb (85 kg) | So | Wasatch Academy | Concord, California |
| G | 5 | Justin Taylor | 6 ft 6 in (1.98 m) | 218 lb (99 kg) | So | IMG Academy | Charlottesville, Virginia |
| C | 10 | Naheem McLeod | 7 ft 4 in (2.24 m) | 255 lb (116 kg) | Jr | Plymouth-Whitemarsh; Florida State | Philadelphia, Pennsylvania |
| G | 11 | Chance Westry | 6 ft 6 in (1.98 m) | 190 lb (86 kg) | So | AZ Compass Prep School (AZ); Auburn | Harrisburg, PA |
| G | 12 | Anthony Clayton (W) | 6 ft 0 in (1.83 m) | 180 lb (82 kg) | Jr | Avon Old Farms (CT) | Albany, New York |
| F | 13 | Benny Williams | 6 ft 9 in (2.06 m) | 210 lb (95 kg) | Jr | IMG Academy | Bowie, Maryland |
| G | 14 | Niko Ruffin (W) | 5 ft 10 in (1.78 m) | 170 lb (77 kg) | Jr | Paramus Catholic | Cresskill, New Jersey |
| C | 21 | William Patterson | 7 ft 2 in (2.18 m) | 220 lb (100 kg) | Fr | The Patrick School | Brooklyn, New York |
| C | 23 | Peter Carey | 6 ft 11 in (2.11 m) | 205 lb (93 kg) | So | Northfield Mount Hermon | Sunderland, Massachusetts |
| G | 24 | Quadir Copeland | 6 ft 6 in (1.98 m) | 200 lb (91 kg) | So | Life Center Academy | Philadelphia, Pennsylvania |
| G | 34 | Chris Gatty (W) | 6 ft 2 in (1.88 m) | 175 lb (79 kg) | Fr | The Masters School | Katonah, New York |
| C | 55 | Mounir Hima | 6 ft 11 in (2.11 m) | 230 lb (104 kg) | RS Jr | St. Benedict's Prep; Duquesne | Tillabéri, Niger |

Head coach

- Adrian Autry, 1st yr. (Syracuse, 1994)

Assistant coach(es)

- Gerry McNamara, 15th yr. (Syracuse, 2007)
- Allen Griffin, 7th yr. (Syracuse, 2001)
- Brenden Straughn, 1st yr. (Hood, 2012)

Legend

- (C) Team captain
- (S) Suspended
- (I) Ineligible
- (W) Walk-on
- Injured
- Current redshirt

Roster

== Schedule and results ==
| Date time, TV | Rank^{#} | Opponent^{#} | Result | Record | High points | High rebounds | High assists | Site (attendance) city, state |
Exhibition
| October 27, 2023*; 7:00 p.m., ACCNX/ESPN+ | | Daemen | W 81–68 | – | 12 – Tied | 6 – Tied | 9 – Copeland | JMA Wireless Dome (4,166); Syracuse, NY |
| November 1, 2023*; 7:00 p.m., ACCNX/ESPN+ | | Saint Rose | W 86–61 | – | 20 – Mintz | 12 – Taylor | 7 – Mintz | JMA Wireless Dome (3,113); Syracuse, NY |
Regular Season
| November 6, 2023*; 7:00 p.m., ACCNX/ESPN+ | | New Hampshire | W 83–72 | 1–0 | 20 – Mintz | 13 – Copeland | 3 – Mintz | JMA Wireless Dome (19,130); Syracuse, NY |
| November 8, 2023*; 7:00 p.m., ACCNX/ESPN+ | | Canisius | W 89–77 | 2–0 | 26 – Mintz | 9 – McLeod | 7 – Starling | JMA Wireless Dome (19,080); Syracuse, NY |
| November 14, 2023*; 7:00 p.m., ACCN | | Colgate | W 79–75 | 3–0 | 25 – Bell | 7 – Starling | 8 – Mintz | JMA Wireless Dome (19,387); Syracuse, NY |
| November 20, 2023*; 2:30 p.m., ESPN2 | | vs. No. 7 Tennessee; Maui Invitational quarterfinals | L 56–73 | 3–1 | 16 – Bell | 7 – Taylor | 2 – Mintz | Stan Sheriff Center (4,838); Honolulu, HI |
| November 21, 2023*; 2:30 p.m., ESPN2 | | vs. No. 11 Gonzaga; Maui Invitational Consolation | L 57–76 | 3–2 | 22 – Mintz | 6 – Starling | 3 – Mintz | Stan Sheriff Center; Honolulu, HI |
| November 22, 2023*; 9:30 p.m., ESPNU | | vs. Chaminade; Maui Invitational | W 105–56 | 4–2 | 18 – Bell | 10 – Taylor | 8 – Copeland | Stan Sheriff Center; Honolulu, HI |
| November 28, 2023*; 7:00 p.m., ESPN2 | | LSU; ACC–SEC Challenge | W 80–57 | 5–2 | 33 – Mintz | 9 – Brown | 5 – Taylor | JMA Wireless Dome (19,602); Syracuse, NY |
| December 2, 2023; 12:00 p.m., ESPN2 | | at Virginia | L 62–84 | 5–3 (0–1) | 16 – Starling | 6 – Copeland | 3 – Taylor | John Paul Jones Arena (14,637); Charlottesville, VA |
| December 5, 2023*; 8:00 p.m., ACCN | | Cornell | W 81–70 | 6–3 | 28 – Mintz | 12 – Brown | 6 – Taylor | JMA Wireless Dome (19,390); Syracuse, NY |
| December 9, 2023*; 11:30 a.m., FOX | | at Georgetown; Rivalry | W 80–68 | 7–3 | 25 – Mintz | 6 – Taylor | 3 – Mintz | Capital One Arena (14,193); Washington, D.C. |
| December 17, 2023*; 1:00 p.m., CBSSN | | vs. Oregon | W 83–63 | 8–3 | 18 – Mintz | 9 – Copeland | 5 – Mintz | Sanford Pentagon (3,138); Sioux Falls, SD |
| December 21, 2023*; 5:00 p.m., ACCNX/ESPN+ | | Niagara | W 83–71 | 9–3 | 18 – Mintz | 10 – Brown | 8 – Copeland | JMA Wireless Dome (18,239); Syracuse, NY |
| December 30, 2023; 12:00 p.m., The CW | | Pittsburgh | W 81–73 | 10–3 (1–1) | 22 – Copeland | 9 – Copeland | 5 – Mintz | JMA Wireless Dome (20,642); Syracuse, NY |
| January 2, 2024; 9:00 p.m., ESPN | | at No. 14 Duke | L 66–86 | 10–4 (1–2) | 26 – Brown | 7 – Brown | 6 – Mintz | Cameron Indoor Stadium (9,314); Durham, NC |
| January 10, 2024; 9:00 p.m., ACCN | | Boston College | W 69–59 | 11–4 (2–2) | 20 – Bell | 8 – Brown | 4 – Tied | JMA Wireless Dome (17,331); Syracuse, NY |
| January 13, 2024; 1:00 p.m., ESPN | | at No. 7 North Carolina | L 67–103 | 11–5 (2–3) | 21 – Mintz | 8 – Brown | 2 – Tied | Dean Smith Center (21,750); Chapel Hill, NC |
| January 16, 2024; 7:00 p.m., ESPN | | at Pittsburgh | W 69–58 | 12–5 (3–3) | 17 – Starling | 9 – Mintz | 5 – Mintz | Petersen Events Center (7,708); Pittsburgh, PA |
| January 20, 2024; 12:00 p.m., ESPN2 | | Miami (FL) | W 72–69 | 13–5 (4–3) | 22 – Starling | 11 – Brown | 13 – Mintz | JMA Wireless Dome (20,960); Syracuse, NY |
| January 23, 2024; 7:00 p.m., ESPN2 | | Florida State | L 69–85 | 13–6 (4–4) | 28 – Mintz | 12 – Brown | 3 – Mintz | JMA Wireless Dome (19,859); Syracuse, NY |
| January 27, 2024; 7:00 p.m., ACCN | | NC State | W 77–65 | 14–6 (5–4) | 26 – Starling | 7 – Brown | 9 – Mintz | JMA Wireless Dome (21,814); Syracuse, NY |
| January 30, 2024; 7:00 p.m., ACCN | | at Boston College | L 75–80 | 14–7 (5–5) | 18 – Tied | 7 – Tied | 7 – Copeland | Conte Forum (6,611); Chestnut Hill, MA |
| February 3, 2024; 7:45 p.m., The CW | | at Wake Forest | L 70–99 | 14–8 (5–6) | 15 – Starling | 8 – Tied | 6 – Mintz | LJVM Coliseum (11,412); Winston-Salem, NC |
| February 7, 2024; 7:00 p.m., ACCN | | Louisville | W 94–92 | 15–8 (6–6) | 30 – Bell | 9 – Brown | 7 – Copeland | JMA Wireless Dome (19,426); Syracuse, NY |
| February 10, 2024; 12:00 p.m., ESPN2 | | Clemson | L 68–77 | 15–9 (6–7) | 16 – Tied | 8 – Brown | 4 – Mintz | JMA Wireless Dome (23,050); Syracuse, NY |
| February 13, 2024; 7:00 p.m., ESPN | | No. 7 North Carolina | W 86–79 | 16–9 (7–7) | 25 – Mintz | 6 – Brown | 4 – Tied | JMA Wireless Dome (21,275); Syracuse, NY |
| February 17, 2024; 5:30 p.m., The CW | | at Georgia Tech | L 60–65 | 16–10 (7–8) | 18 – Starling | 7 – Brown | 2 – Tied | McCamish Pavilion (6,241); Atlanta, GA |
| February 20, 2024; 7:00 p.m., ESPN2 | | at NC State | W 87–83 | 17–10 (8–8) | 26 – Bell | 7 – Copeland | 4 – Brown | PNC Arena (12,766); Raleigh, NC |
| February 24, 2024; 12:00 p.m., ESPN | | Notre Dame | W 88–85 | 18–10 (9–8) | 21 – Mintz | 7 – Brown | 5 – Tied | JMA Wireless Dome (25,194); Syracuse, NY |
| February 27, 2024; 7:00 p.m., ESPNU | | Virginia Tech | W 84–71 | 19–10 (10–8) | 29 – Mintz | 8 – Brown | 6 – Mintz | JMA Wireless Dome (20,244); Syracuse, NY |
| March 2, 2024; 8:00 p.m., ACCN | | at Louisville | W 82–76 | 20–10 (11–8) | 23 – Bell | 10 – Brown | 5 – Mintz | KFC Yum! Center (11,011); Louisville, KY |
| March 5, 2024; 7:00 p.m., ESPN2 | | at Clemson | L 75–90 | 20–11 (11–9) | 20 – Mintz | 11 – Brown | 4 – Mintz | Littlejohn Coliseum (9,000); Clemson, SC |
ACC Tournament
| March 13, 2024; 7:00 p.m., ESPN2 | (7) | vs. (10) NC State; Second Round | L 65–83 | 20–12 | 21 – Mintz | 12 – Brown | 4 – Tied | Capital One Arena (13,445); Washington, D.C. |
*Non-conference game. ^{#}Rankings from AP Poll. (#) Tournament seedings in parentheses. All times are in Eastern Time.

== Rankings ==
Ranking movements Legend: — = Not ranked
| | Week | | | | | | | | | | | | | | | | | | | | |
| Poll | Pre | 1 | 2 | 3 | 4 | 5 | 6 | 7 | 8 | 9 | 10 | 11 | 12 | 13 | 14 | 15 | 16 | 17 | 18 | 19 | Final |
|---|---|---|---|---|---|---|---|---|---|---|---|---|---|---|---|---|---|---|---|---|---|
| AP | — | — | — | — | — | — | — | — | — | — | — | — | — | — | — | — | — | — | — | — | — |
| Coaches | — | — | — | — | — | — | — | — | — | — | — | — | — | — | — | — | — | — | — | — | — |

*AP does not release post-NCAA Tournament rankings
