= Mohamed Diarra =

French basketball player (born 2000)

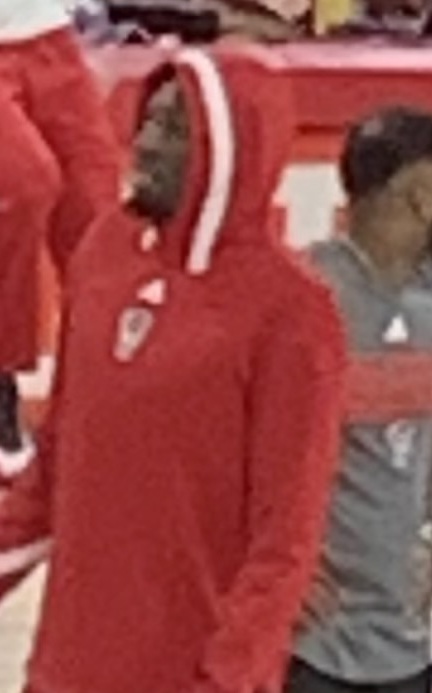
- Diarra with NC State in 2023

No. 93 – Cholet Basket
- Position: Power forward
- League: LNB Élite; Champions League

Personal information
- Born: 1 January 2000 (age 26) Paris, France
- Listed height: 2.08 m (6 ft 10 in)
- Listed weight: 98 kg (216 lb)

Career information
- High school: Redemption Academy (Troy, New York)
- College: Garden City CC (2020–2022); Missouri (2022–2023); NC State (2023–2024)
- NBA draft: 2024: undrafted
- Playing career: 2024–present

Career history
- 2024–2025: Limoges CSP
- 2025–present: Cholet Basket

Mohamed Nelson Diarra-Camara (born 1 January 2000) is a French professional basketball player for Cholet Basket of the LNB Élite. He played college basketball for the Garden City CC Broncbusters, the Missouri Tigers, and the NC State Wolfpack.

== Early life and high school career ==
Diarra attended high school at Redemption Academy. He committed to playing college basketball for JUCO Garden City CC.

== College career ==
=== Garden City CC ===
As a freshman, Diarra averaged 8.4 points and 10.2 rebounds in 20 games. As a sophomore, he averaged 17.8 points and 12.6 rebounds per game en route to being named the top JUCO prospect.

=== Missouri ===
After two seasons of JUCO basketball, Diarra committed to play for Missouri. Against Alabama, he recorded a season-high 12 rebounds. During the 2022–23 season, Diarra played in 25 games while making six starts where averaged 3.2 points and 3.2 rebounds per game. After one season with Missouri, Diarra entered the NCAA transfer portal.

=== NC State ===
Diarra transferred to play for NC State. In his first game with NC State, he notched ten points, 14 rebounds, and three blocks in a win over The Citadel. On February 10, 2024, Diarra notched his second double-double of the year scoring 13 points and bringing down 12 rebounds in an 83–79 loss to Wake Forest. In the Sweet 16, Diarra helped the Wolfpack upset the two seed Marquette after scoring 11 points and grabbing 15 rebounds in a 67–58 win.

== Professional career ==
On 28 June 2024, Diarra signed an Exhibit 10 contract with the Los Angeles Lakers.

On August 9, 2024, he signed with Limoges CSP of the LNB Pro A.

On July 1, 2025, he signed with Cholet Basket of LNB Pro A.

== Career statistics ==
Legend
GP	Games played	GS	Games started	MPG	Minutes per game
FG%	Field goal percentage	3P%	3-point field goal percentage	FT%	Free throw percentage
RPG	Rebounds per game	APG	Assists per game	SPG	Steals per game
BPG	Blocks per game	PPG	Points per game	**Bold**	Career high

=== College ===
==== NCAA Division I ====
Year	Team	GP	GS	MPG	FG%	3P%	FT%	RPG	APG	SPG	BPG	PPG
2022–23	Missouri	25	6	11.7	.400	.250	.558	3.3	**.6**	.5	.6	3.2
2023–24	NC State	**40**	**22**	**22.1**	**.477**	**.309**	**.658**	**7.8**	**.6**	**.7**	**1.0**	**6.3**
Career		65	28	18.1	.457	.298	.621	6.0	.6	.6	.9	5.1

==== JUCO ====
Year	Team	GP	GS	MPG	FG%	3P%	FT%	RPG	APG	SPG	BPG	PPG
2020–21	Garden City CC	20	4	20.8	.382	**.309**	.646	10.2	1.1	.6	1.8	8.4
2021–22	Garden City CC	**30**	**30**	**30.0**	**.452**	.300	**.714**	**12.6**	**1.7**	**1.9**	**2.4**	**17.8**
Career		50	34	26.3	.435	.303	.695	11.6	1.4	1.3	2.1	14.1

== Personal life ==
Diarra is a Muslim and participates in Ramadan.
