= North Carolina Tar Heels men's basketball statistical leaders =

The North Carolina Tar Heels men's basketball statistical leaders are individual statistical leaders of the North Carolina Tar Heels men's basketball program in various categories, including points, three-pointers, assists, blocks, rebounds, and steals. Within those areas, the lists identify single-game, single-season, and career leaders. The Tar Heels represent the University of North Carolina at Chapel Hill in the NCAA's Atlantic Coast Conference.

North Carolina began competing in intercollegiate basketball in 1910. However, the school's record book does not generally list records from before the 1950s, as records from before this period are often incomplete and inconsistent. Since scoring was much lower in this era, and teams played much fewer games during a typical season, it is likely that few or no players from this era would appear on these lists anyway.

The NCAA did not officially record assists as a stat until the 1983–84 season, and blocks and steals until the 1985–86 season, but North Carolina's record books includes players in these stats before these seasons. These lists are updated through the end of the 2020–21 season. The most recent player and still on the team currently is RJ Davis. He is one of North Carolina’s all time scorers.

== Scoring ==
Career
Rk	Player	Points	Seasons
1	Tyler Hansbrough	2,872	2005–06 2006–07 2007–08 2008–09
2	RJ Davis	2,725	2020-21 2021-22 2022-23 2023-24 2024-25
3	Armando Bacot	2,347	2019-20 2020-21 2021-22 2022-23 2023-24
4	Phil Ford	2,290	1980–81 1981–82 1982–83 1983–84
5	Sam Perkins	2,145	1980–81 1981–82 1982–83 1983–84
6	Lennie Rosenbluth	2,047	1954–55 1955–56 1956–57
7	Al Wood	2,015	1977–78 1978–79 1979–80 1980–81
8	Charlie Scott	2,007	1967–68 1968–69 1969–70
9	Larry Miller	1,982	1965–66 1966–67 1967–68
10	Antawn Jamison	1,974	1995–96 1996–97 1997–98

Season
Rk	Player	Points	Season
1	Lennie Rosenbluth	897	1956–57
2	Tyler Hansbrough	882	2007–08
3	Antawn Jamison	822	1997–98
4	RJ Davis	784	2023–24
5	Bobby Lewis	740	1965–66
6	Justin Jackson	731	2016–17
6	Charlie Scott	731	1969–70
8	Michael Jordan	721	1982–83
9	Larry Miller	717	1967–68
10	Charlie Scott	714	1968–69

Single game
Rk	Player	Points	Season	Opponent
1	Bobby Lewis	49	1965–66	Florida State
2	Billy Cunningham	48	1964–65	Tulane
3	Lennie Rosenbluth	47	1956–57	Furman
4	Lennie Rosenbluth	45	1956–57	Clemson
4	Lennie Rosenbluth	45	1955–56	William & Mary
4	Lennie Rosenbluth	45	1955–56	Clemson
4	George Glamack	45	1940–41	Clemson
8	Charlie Scott	43	1969–70	Wake Forest
8	Bobby Lewis	43	1965–66	Richmond
10	Shammond Williams	42	1997–98	Georgia Tech
10	RJ Davis	42	2023-24	Miami (FL)

== Rebounds ==
Career
Rk	Player	Rebounds	Seasons
1	Armando Bacot	1,715	2019–20 2020–21 2021–22 2022–23 2023-24
2	Tyler Hansbrough	1,219	2005–06 2006–07 2007–08 2008–09
3	Sam Perkins	1,167	1980–81 1981–82 1982–83 1983–84
4	George Lynch	1,097	1989–90 1990–91 1991–92 1992–93
5	Billy Cunningham	1,062	1962–63 1963–64 1964–65
6	Kennedy Meeks	1,052	2013–14 2014–15 2015–16 2016–17
7	Brice Johnson	1,035	2012–13 2013–14 2014–15 2015–16
8	Antawn Jamison	1,027	1995–96 1996–97 1997–98
9	Mitch Kupchak	1,006	1972–73 1973–74 1974–75 1975–76
10	Brad Daugherty	1,003	1982–83 1983–84 1984–85 1985–86

Season
Rk	Player	Rebounds	Season
1	Armando Bacot	511	2021–22
2	Brice Johnson	416	2015–16
3	Tyler Hansbrough	399	2007–08
4	Sean May	397	2004–05
5	Antawn Jamison	389	1997–98
6	Armando Bacot	380	2023–24
7	Billy Cunningham	379	1963–64
8	Kennedy Meeks	378	2016–17
9	Luke Maye	377	2018–19
10	John Henson	374	2010–11

Single game
	Player	Rebounds	Season	Opponent
1	Rusty Clark	30	1967–68	Maryland
2	Billy Cunningham	28	1963–64	Maryland
3	Billy Cunningham	27	1962–63	Clemson
4	Billy Cunningham	25	1964–65	Tulane
	Billy Cunningham	25	1963–64	South Carolina
	Billy Cunningham	25	1963–64	Virginia Tech
	Lennie Rosenbluth	25	1954–55	Virginia
	Lennie Rosenbluth	25	1954–55	South Carolina

== Assists ==
Career
Rk	Player	Assists	Seasons
1	Ed Cota	1,030	1996–97 1997–98 1998–99 1999–00
2	Kenny Smith	768	1983–84 1984–85 1985–86 1986–87
3	Phil Ford	753	1974–75 1975–76 1976–77 1977–78
4	Raymond Felton	697	2002–03 2003–04 2004–05
5	Derrick Phelps	637	1990–91 1991–92 1992–93 1993–94
6	King Rice	629	1987–88 1988–89 1989–90 1990–91
7	Ty Lawson	608	2006–07 2007–08 2008–09
8	Marcus Paige	602	2012–13 2013–14 2014–15 2015–16
9	Kendall Marshall	581	2010–11 2011–12
10	Jeff Lebo	580	1985–86 1986–87 1987–88 1988–89

Season
Rk	Player	Assists	Season
1	Kendall Marshall	351	2011–12
2	Ed Cota	284	1999–00
3	Ed Cota	274	1997–98
4	Raymond Felton	249	2004–05
5	Ed Cota	238	1998–99
6	Raymond Felton	235	2002–03
	Kenny Smith	235	1984–85
8	Ed Cota	234	1996–97
9	Elliot Cadeau	231	2024–25
10	Kendall Marshall	230	2010–11
	Ty Lawson	230	2008–09

Single game
Rk	Player	Assists	Season	Opponent
1	Raymond Felton	18	2003–04	George Mason
2	Ed Cota	17	1999–00	UNLV
	Jeff Lebo	17	1988–89	UT Chattanooga
4	Kendall Marshall	16	2011–12	Maryland
	Kendall Marshall	16	2011–12	Long Beach State
	Kendall Marshall	16	2010–11	Florida State
7	Kendall Marshall	15	2011–12	Tennessee State
	Kendall Marshall	15	2011–12	UNC Asheville
9	Kendall Marshall	14	2011–12	South Carolina
	Kendall Marshall	14	2010–11	Washington
	Raymond Felton	14	2002–03	Wyoming
	Ed Cota	14	1997–98	Florida State
	Ed Cota	14	1997–98	Appalachian State
	Phil Ford	14	1976–77	NC State
	Phil Ford	14	1976–77	Brigham Young
	Phil Ford	14	1974–75	Howard

== Steals ==
Career
Rk	Player	Steals	Seasons
1	Derrick Phelps	247	1990–91 1991–92 1992–93 1993–94
2	George Lynch	241	1989–90 1990–91 1991–92 1992–93
3	Marcus Paige	203	2012–13 2013–14 2014–15 2015–16
4	Rick Fox	197	1987–88 1988–89 1989–90 1990–91
5	Kenny Smith	195	1983–84 1984–85 1985–86 1986–87
6	Ed Cota	192	1996–97 1997–98 1998–99 1999–00
7	Raymond Felton	191	2002–03 2003–04 2004–05
8	Dudley Bradley	190	1975–76 1976–77 1977–78 1978–79
9	Ty Lawson	184	2006–07 2007–08 2008–09
10	Mike O’Koren	183	1976–77 1977–78 1978–79 1979–80

Season
Rk	Player	Steals	Season
1	Dudley Bradley	97	1978–79
2	George Lynch	89	1992–93
3	Derrick Phelps	82	1992–93
4	Derrick Phelps	78	1991–92
	Michael Jordan	78	1982–83
	Walter Davis	78	1976–77
7	Ty Lawson	75	2008–09
8	Raymond Felton	72	2004–05
9	Walter Davis	71	1975–76
10	Rick Fox	70	1990–91

Single game
Rk	Player	Steals	Season	Opponent
1	Derrick Phelps	9	1991–92	Georgia Tech
2	Ty Lawson	8	2008–09	Michigan State
	Tyler Hansbrough	8	2005–06	UNC Asheville
	Derrick Phelps	8	1991–92	Central Florida
	Dudley Bradley	8	1977–78	Oregon State
6	Ty Lawson	7	2008–09	Michigan State
	Derrick Phelps	7	1993–94	Maryland
	George Lynch	7	1992–93	Florida State
	Derrick Phelps	7	1992–93	Cornell
	Derrick Phelps	7	1992–93	Houston
	Jimmy Black	7	1981–82	Tulsa
	Dudley Bradley	7	1978–79	Duke
	Dudley Bradley	7	1978–79	Wake Forest
	Walter Davis	7	1975–76	Wake Forest

== Blocks ==
Career
Rk	Player	Blocks	Seasons
1	Brendan Haywood	304	1997–98 1998–99 1999–00 2000–01
2	John Henson	279	2009–10 2010–11 2011–12
3	Sam Perkins	245	1980–81 1981–82 1982–83 1983–84
4	Armando Bacot	216	2019–20 2020–21 2021–22 2022–23 2023-24
5	Warren Martin	190	1981–82 1982–83 1984–85 1985–86
6	Kevin Salvadori	174	1990–91 1991–92 1992–93 1993–94
7	Eric Montross	169	1990–91 1991–92 1992–93 1993–94
8	Brice Johnson	163	2012–13 2013–14 2014–15 2015–16
9	Scott Williams	161	1986–87 1987–88 1988–89 1989–90
10	Rasheed Wallace	156	1993–94 1994–95

Season
Rk	Player	Blocks	Season
1	Brendan Haywood	120	2000–01
2	John Henson	118	2010–11
3	John Henson	101	2011–12
4	Rasheed Wallace	93	1994–95
5	Brendan Haywood	91	1999–00
6	Warren Martin	81	1985–86
	Warren Martin	81	1984–85
8	Sam Perkins	67	1980–81
9	Ed Davis	65	2008–09
	Brandan Wright	65	2006–07
	Sam Perkins	65	1982–83
	Armando Bacot	65	2021–22

Single game
Rk	Player	Blocks	Season	Opponent
1	Brendan Haywood	10	2000–01	Miami (Fla.)
2	John Henson	9	2011–12	Michigan State
	Warren Martin	9	1985–86	Stanford
