= 2023–24 North Carolina Tar Heels men's basketball team =

American college basketball season

2023–24 North Carolina Tar Heels men's basketball

ACC regular season champions

NCAA tournament, Sweet Sixteen
- Conference: Atlantic Coast Conference

Ranking
- Coaches: No. 6
- AP: No. 7
- Record: 29–8 (17–3 ACC)
- Head coach: Hubert Davis (3rd season)
- Assistant coaches: Jeff Lebo (3rd season); Sean May (3rd season); Brad Frederick (7th season)
- Home arena: Dean E. Smith Center

2023–24 ACC men's basketball standings
	Conf.				Overall
Team	W		L	PCT	W		L	PCT
No. 7 North Carolina	17	–	3	.850	29	–	8	.784
No. 9 Duke	15	–	5	.750	27	–	9	.750
Virginia	13	–	7	.650	23	–	11	.676
Pittsburgh	12	–	8	.600	22	–	11	.667
Wake Forest	11	–	9	.550	21	–	14	.600
No. 14 Clemson	11	–	9	.550	24	–	12	.667
Syracuse	11	–	9	.550	20	–	12	.625
Virginia Tech	10	–	10	.500	19	–	15	.559
Florida State	10	–	10	.500	17	–	16	.515
No. 10 NC State †	9	–	11	.450	26	–	15	.634
Boston College	8	–	12	.400	20	–	16	.556
Notre Dame	7	–	13	.350	13	–	20	.394
Georgia Tech	7	–	13	.350	14	–	18	.438
Miami (FL)	6	–	14	.300	15	–	17	.469
Louisville	3	–	17	.150	8	–	24	.250
† 2024 ACC tournament winner Rankings from AP Poll

The 2023–24 North Carolina Tar Heels men's basketball team represented the University of North Carolina at Chapel Hill for the 2023–24 NCAA Division I men's basketball season. The team was led by coach Hubert Davis, who entered his third season as UNC's head coach, and was assisted by Jeff Lebo, Sean May, and Brad Frederick. The Tar Heels played their home games at the Dean Smith Center in Chapel Hill, North Carolina, as members of the Atlantic Coast Conference (ACC). The North Carolina Tar Heels men's basketball team drew an average home attendance of 20,593 in 2023-24, the highest in college basketball.

The Tar Heels began the season ranked nineteenth in the nation, and progressed up the rankings to fourteenth after three straight wins. It was with that ranking that they entered their early-season tournament, the Battle 4 Atlantis. They won their first game against Northern Iowa before losing in overtime to Villanova. They defeated twentieth-ranked Arkansas to finish in third place in the tournament. They then beat tenth-ranked Tennessee in the ACC–SEC Challenge and won their ACC opener over Florida State. They were defeated by eventual national champion, then fifth-ranked UConn in the Jimmy V Classic and lost a rivalry match to fourteenth-ranked Kentucky. They defeated seventh-ranked Oklahoma in the Jumpman Invitational to move up to ninth in the rankings. The defeat of Oklahoma started a string of ten straight wins for the team, including rivalry wins over NC State and Wake Forest and a ten-point defeat of sixteenth-ranked Clemson. At the end of the streak, the team reached its highest ranking during the season, third. The Tar Heels had a rough stretch after that, winning only two of their next five games. However, one of those two wins was against bitter rival, and seventh-ranked Duke. The team won its last six games including rivalry re-matches with NC State and ninth-ranked Duke.

The Tar Heels finished the season 29–8 and 17–3 in ACC play to finish as regular season champions. As the first seed in the ACC tournament, they earned a bye to the Quarterfinals, where they defeated ninth seed Florida State. They defeated Pittsburgh in the Semifinals, but could not overcome NC State for a third time in the season in the Final. They lost 84–76 to finish as runner-up. They earned an at-large bid to the NCAA tournament and were placed as a first seed in the West region. They defeated sixteenth-seed Wagner in the First Round, and ninth-seed Michigan State in the Second Round before falling to fourth-seed Alabama in the Sweet Sixteen to end their season.

== Previous season ==
After starters Caleb Love, R. J. Davis, Armando Bacot, and Leaky Black, who had been key pieces in the 2021–22 team's National Runner-Up finish, decided to return for the 2022–23 season, the Tar Heels earned the No. 1 ranking in the preseason AP Poll. Despite the lofty expectations and desires to win the championship that had narrowly eluded them the season prior, the 2022–23 Tar Heels struggled mightily, finishing the season 20–13 (11–9 in conference play) and missing the NCAA tournament altogether. The 2022–23 team became the first preseason No. 1 to miss the NCAA tournament since the field expanded to 64 teams in 1985. After missing the "big dance," the Tar Heels issued a statement declining a bid for the NIT.

Bacot, despite battling ankle and shoulder injuries that caused him to miss some time, proved to be one of the lone bright spots on the season, as neither Love, Davis, nor Black returned to their form from the 2022 tournament run. Bacot set all-time program records for career double-doubles by passing Billy Cunningham's school record of 61, and he also became the all-time leading rebounder in program history by passing Tyler Hansbrough's record as well.

== Offseason ==
After declining a bid to the NIT, the offseason began sooner than many in Chapel Hill had expected. On March 13, 2023, the Transfer Portal officially opened, and like many other programs, the Tar Heels immediately lost players, with first-year reserve forward Tyler Nickel and senior Justin McKoy both entering the portal. Nickel transferred to Virginia Tech, and McKoy chose to spend his final season of eligibility at Hawaii.

Following Nickel and McKoy, sophomore guard/forward Dontrez Styles announced his intentions to leave the Tar Heels and enter the transfer portal. He committed to Georgetown in April.

Puff Johnson also entered his name into the transfer portal, on March 22, 2023. He later committed to Penn State.

Leaky Black and Pete Nance, who had both used their extra year of eligibility provided by the COVID-19 pandemic for the 2022–23 season also left the team, as both had their eligibility expire after using their fifth-year options.

Later that week, both R.J. Davis and Armando Bacot announced their decisions to return for another season in Chapel Hill.

Reserve forward Will Shaver announced his intentions to enter the transfer portal on March 25, 2023. After originally committing to Belmont, Shaver announced in a tweet that he had reopened his transfer recruitment. He later committed to UAB, deciding to return to his hometown of Birmingham.

After much speculation as to what his future would hold, Caleb Love decided to enter the transfer portal and play his senior season elsewhere. Love originally committed to Michigan, but decommitted after reported issues with transfer credits. He later announced his commitment to Arizona, reuniting with former Tar Heel assistant Steve Robinson, who is currently an assistant at Arizona.

The Tar Heels sought to fill these departures by utilizing the transfer portal to bring in new players. They received their first commitment when former Brown guard Paxson Wojcik committed to the Tar Heels for his final season of eligibility. He is the son of Doug Wojcik, who was an assistant coach for the Tar Heels from 2000–2003 under Matt Doherty.

The team received its second transfer portal commitment in April, as former Louisville forward, and Charlotte native, Jae'Lyn Withers announced his decision to return to his home state and transfer to Carolina.

Later in the month, former Notre Dame guard Cormac Ryan committed to the Tar Heels following an official visit to Chapel Hill.

Coach Davis' Tar Heels received another portal commitment on April 22, when former Stanford wing Harrison Ingram, the 2022 Pac-12 Freshman of the Year, committed to the Tar Heels.

On May 11, sophomore guard D'Marco Dunn entered the transfer portal.

Also in May, guard Elliot Cadeau, who had been committed to the Tar Heels as part of their 2024 recruiting class, announced his intentions to reclassify and head to Chapel Hill for the 2023-24 season.

After a few months of relative quiet, the Tar Heels received another transfer portal commitment in July, when former West Virginia reserve big man James Okonkwo committed to the team.

=== Departures ===
North Carolina Departures
Name	Number	Pos.	Height	Weight	Year	Hometown	Reason for Departure
Leaky Black	1	G	6'9"	205	Graduate	Concord, NC	Exhausted eligibility
D'Marco Dunn	11	G	6'5"	190	Sophomore	Tucson, AZ	Transferred to Penn State
Puff Johnson	14	G/F	6'8"	200	Junior	Moon Township, PA	Transferred to Penn State
Caleb Love	2	G	6'4"	200	Junior	St. Louis, MO	Transferred to Arizona
Justin McKoy	22	F	6'8"	220	Senior	Raleigh, NC	Transferred to Hawaii
Pete Nance	32	F	6'11"	230	Graduate	Akron, OH	Exhausted eligibility
Tyler Nickel	24	G/F	6'7"	220	Freshman	Harrisonburg, VA	Transferred to Virginia Tech
Will Shaver	21	F	6'10"	260	(redshirt) Freshman	Birmingham, AL	Transferred to UAB
Dontrez Styles	3	G/F	6'6"	210	Sophomore	Kinston, NC	Transferred to Georgetown

=== Additions ===
==== Incoming transfers ====
North Carolina incoming transfers
Name	Number	Pos.	Height	Weight	Year	Hometown	Previous School	Years Remaining	Date Committed
Harrison Ingram	55	F	6'7"	230	Junior	Dallas, TX	Stanford	2	April 22, 2023
James Okonkwo	32	F	6'8"	240	Junior	Maidenhead, England	West Virginia	2	July 6, 2023
Cormac Ryan	3	G	6'5	195	Graduate	New York, NY	Notre Dame	1	April 20, 2023
Jae'Lyn Withers	24	F	6'9"	220	Senior	Charlotte, NC	Louisville	2	April 11, 2023
Paxson Wojcik	8	G	6'5"	200	Graduate	Charleston, SC	Brown	1	March 27, 2023

==== Recruiting class ====
College recruiting information
Name	Hometown	School	Height	Weight	Commit date
Elliot Cadeau; PG	West Orange, NJ	Link Academy (MO)	6 ft 1 in (1.85 m)	165 lb (75 kg)	Dec 28, 2022
Elliot Cadeau; PG	Recruit ratings: Rivals: 247Sports: ESPN: (91)				
Zayden High; F	Rockwall, TX	Compass Prep (AZ)	6 ft 9 in (2.06 m)	225 lb (102 kg)	Oct 16, 2022
Zayden High; F	Recruit ratings: Rivals: 247Sports: ESPN: (84)				
Overall recruit ranking: Rivals: 10 247Sports: 13
Note: In many cases, Scout, Rivals, 247Sports, On3, and ESPN may conflict in their listings of height and weight.; In these cases, the average was taken. ESPN grades are on a 100-point scale.; Sources: "North Carolina 2023 Basketball Commitments". Rivals.; "2023 North Carolina Tar Heels Recruiting Class". ESPN.; "2023 Team Ranking". Rivals.

== Roster ==
2023–24 North Carolina Tar Heels men's basketball team
Players
Coaches

Pos.	#	Name	Height	Weight	Year	Previous school	Hometown
F	1	Zayden High	6 ft 9 in (2.06 m)	225 lb (102 kg)	Fr	Compass Prep	Rockwall, TX
G	2	Elliot Cadeau	6 ft 1 in (1.85 m)	180 lb (82 kg)	Fr	Link Academy (MO)	West Orange, NJ
G	3	Cormac Ryan	6 ft 5 in (1.96 m)	195 lb (88 kg)	GS	Notre Dame	New York, NY
G	4	R. J. Davis	6 ft 0 in (1.83 m)	180 lb (82 kg)	Sr	Archbishop Stepinac	White Plains, NY
F/C	5	Armando Bacot	6 ft 11 in (2.11 m)	240 lb (109 kg)	GS	IMG Academy	Richmond, VA
G	7	Seth Trimble	6 ft 3 in (1.91 m)	195 lb (88 kg)	So	Menomonee Falls	Menomonee Falls, WI
G	8	Paxson Wojcik	6 ft 5 in (1.96 m)	195 lb (88 kg)	GS	Brown	Charleston, SC
F	13	Jalen Washington	6 ft 10 in (2.08 m)	230 lb (104 kg)	So	West Side	Gary, IN
G	14	Creighton Lebo	6 ft 1 in (1.85 m)	180 lb (82 kg)	Sr	Greenfield	Greenville, NC
G	22	Rob Landry (W)	6 ft 4 in (1.93 m)	190 lb (86 kg)	Sr	NCSSM	Greensboro, NC
F	24	Jae'Lyn Withers	6 ft 9 in (2.06 m)	215 lb (98 kg)	GS	Louisville	Charlotte, NC
F	32	James Okonkwo	6 ft 8 in (2.03 m)	240 lb (109 kg)	Jr	West Virginia	Maidenhead, England
F	34	Duwe Farris (W)	6 ft 7 in (2.01 m)	210 lb (95 kg)	GS	Myers Park	Charlotte, NC
F	55	Harrison Ingram	6 ft 7 in (2.01 m)	235 lb (107 kg)	Jr	Stanford	Dallas, TX

Head coach

- Hubert Davis (North Carolina)

Assistant coach(es)

- Jeff Lebo (North Carolina)
- Sean May (North Carolina)
- Brad Frederick (North Carolina)

Legend

- (C) Team captain
- (S) Suspended
- (I) Ineligible
- (W) Walk-on
- Injured
- Current redshirt

Roster
Last update: November 5, 2023

== Schedule and results ==
Date time, TV	Rank^{#}	Opponent^{#}	Result	Record	High points	High rebounds	High assists	Site (attendance) city, state
Exhibition
October 27, 2023*; 7:30 p.m., ACCNX/ESPN+	No. 19	St. Augustine’s	W 117–53	–	22 – Davis	11 – High	4 – Tied	Dean Smith Center; Chapel Hill, NC
Regular Season
November 6, 2023*; 7:00 p.m., ACCN	No. 19	Radford	W 86–70	1–0	23 – Bacot	15 – Bacot	6 – Cadeau	Dean Smith Center (17,331); Chapel Hill, NC
November 12, 2023*; 2:00 p.m., ACCN	No. 19	Lehigh	W 90–68	2–0	22 – Tied	20 – Bacot	3 – Tied	Dean Smith Center (18,608); Chapel Hill, NC
November 17, 2023*; 8:00 p.m., ACCN	No. 20	UC Riverside	W 77–52	3–0	21 – Bacot	9 – Ingram	4 – Davis	Dean Smith Center (18,226); Chapel Hill, NC
November 22, 2023*; 12:00 p.m., ESPN	No. 14	vs. Northern Iowa; Battle 4 Atlantis Quarterfinals	W 91–69	4–0	16 – Ingram	9 – Ingram	4 – Davis	Imperial Arena (1,342); Paradise Island, Bahamas
November 23, 2023*; 2:30 p.m., ESPN	No. 14	vs. Villanova; Battle 4 Atlantis Semifinals	L 81–83 ^{OT}	4–1	23 – Davis	18 – Bacot	5 – Cadeau	Imperial Arena (1,500); Paradise Island, Bahamas
November 24, 2023*; 1:00 pm, ESPN2	No. 14	vs. No. 20 Arkansas; Battle 4 Atlantis 3rd Place Game	W 87–72	5–1	30 – Davis	10 – Ingram	6 – Ingram	Imperial Arena (1,456); Paradise Island, Bahamas
November 29, 2023*; 7:15 p.m., ESPN	No. 17	No. 10 Tennessee; ACC–SEC Challenge	W 100–92	6–1	27 – Davis	11 – Bacot	10 – Cadeau	Dean Smith Center (20,756); Chapel Hill, NC
December 2, 2023; 2:00 p.m., ACCN	No. 17	Florida State	W 78–70	7–1 (1–0)	27 – Davis	13 – Bacot	5 – Davis	Dean Smith Center (20,285); Chapel Hill, NC
December 5, 2023*; 9:00 p.m., ESPN	No. 9	vs. No. 5 UConn; Jimmy V Classic	L 76–87	7–2	26 – Davis	13 – Bacot	5 – Tied	Madison Square Garden (17,873); New York, NY
December 16, 2023*; 5:30 p.m., CBS	No. 9	vs. No. 14 Kentucky; CBS Sports Classic/Rivalry	L 83–87	7–3	27 – Davis	7 – Davis	4 – Davis	State Farm Arena (17,058); Atlanta, GA
December 20, 2023*; 9:00 p.m., ESPN	No. 11	vs. No. 7 Oklahoma; Jumpman Invitational	W 81–69	8–3	23 – Davis	8 – Bacot	5 – Davis	Spectrum Center (16,344); Charlotte, NC
December 29, 2023*; 8:00 p.m., ACCN	No. 9	Charleston Southern	W 105–60	9–3	20 – Davis	9 – Bacot	10 – Davis	Dean Smith Center (21,750); Chapel Hill, NC
January 2, 2024; 7:00 p.m., ESPN	No. 8	at Pittsburgh	W 70–57	10–3 (2–0)	16 – Bacot	15 – Ingram	4 – Davis	Petersen Events Center (9,770); Pittsburgh, PA
January 6, 2024; 12:00 p.m., ESPN2	No. 8	at No. 16 Clemson	W 65–55	11–3 (3–0)	14 – Tied	16 – Bacot	4 – Ryan	Littlejohn Coliseum (9,000); Clemson, SC
January 10, 2024; 8:00 p.m., ESPN	No. 7	at NC State; Rivalry	W 67–54	12–3 (4–0)	16 – Davis	19 – Ingram	6 – Cadeau	PNC Arena (19,500); Raleigh, NC
January 13, 2024; 12:00 p.m., ESPN	No. 7	Syracuse	W 103–67	13–3 (5–0)	22 – Davis	11 – Bacot	3 – Tied	Dean Smith Center (21,750); Chapel Hill, NC
January 17, 2024; 9:00 p.m., ACCN	No. 4	Louisville	W 86–70	14–3 (6–0)	19 – Davis	10 – Withers	6 – Davis	Dean Smith Center (20,298); Chapel Hill, NC
January 20, 2024; 2:15 p.m., The CW	No. 4	at Boston College	W 76–66	15–3 (7–0)	16 – Davis	13 – Ingram	5 – Cadeau	Conte Forum (8,606); Chestnut Hill, MA
January 22, 2024; 7:00 p.m., ESPN	No. 3	Wake Forest; Rivalry	W 85–64	16–3 (8–0)	36 – Davis	14 – Ingram	3 – Cadeau	Dean Smith Center (21,175); Chapel Hill, NC
January 27, 2024; 2:00 p.m., ESPN	No. 3	at Florida State	W 75–68	17–3 (9–0)	24 – Davis	17 – Ingram	6 – Cadeau	Donald L. Tucker Civic Center (10,092); Tallahassee, FL
January 30, 2024; 7:00 p.m., ESPN	No. 3	at Georgia Tech	L 73–74	17–4 (9–1)	28 – Davis	13 – Ingram	5 – Cadeau	McCamish Pavilion (8,600); Atlanta, GA
February 3, 2024; 6:30 p.m., ESPN	No. 3	No. 7 Duke; College GameDay/Rivalry	W 93–84	18–4 (10–1)	25 – Bacot	13 – Ingram	5 – Tied	Dean Smith Center (21,750); Chapel Hill, NC
February 6, 2024; 7:00 p.m., ESPN	No. 3	Clemson	L 76–80	18–5 (10–2)	24 – Bacot	13 – Bacot	5 – Davis	Dean Smith Center (20,689); Chapel Hill, NC
February 10, 2024; 4:00 p.m., ESPN	No. 3	at Miami (FL)	W 75–72	19–5 (11–2)	25 – Davis	15 – Bacot	8 – Cadeau	Watsco Center (7,972); Coral Gables, FL
February 13, 2024; 7:00 p.m., ESPN	No. 7	at Syracuse	L 79–86	19–6 (11–3)	19 – Davis	11 – Ingram	7 – Cadeau	JMA Wireless Dome (21,275); Syracuse, NY
February 17, 2024; 2:00 p.m., ACCN	No. 7	Virginia Tech	W 96–81	20–6 (12–3)	25 – Bacot	17 – Ingram	5 – Davis	Dean Smith Center (21,750); Chapel Hill, NC
February 24, 2024; 4:00 p.m., ESPN	No. 10	at Virginia	W 54–44	21–6 (13–3)	18 – Ryan	13 – Bacot	6 – Cadeau	John Paul Jones Arena (14,637); Charlottesville, VA
February 26, 2024; 7:00 p.m., ESPN	No. 9	Miami (FL)	W 75–71	22–6 (14–3)	42 – Davis	12 – Bacot	5 – Cadeau	Dean Smith Center (21,027); Chapel Hill, NC
March 2, 2024; 4:00 p.m., ESPN	No. 9	NC State; Rivalry	W 79–70	23–6 (15–3)	22 – Ingram	7 – Tied	7 – Cadeau	Dean Smith Center (21,750); Chapel Hill, NC
March 5, 2024; 7:00 p.m., ACCN	No. 7	Notre Dame	W 84–51	24–6 (16–3)	22 – Davis	14 – Ingram	6 – Davis	Dean Smith Center (21,750); Chapel Hill, NC
March 9, 2024; 6:30 p.m., ESPN	No. 7	at No. 9 Duke; Rivalry	W 84–79	25–6 (17–3)	31 – Ryan	10 – Ingram	3 – Tied	Cameron Indoor Stadium (9,314); Durham, NC
ACC Tournament
March 14, 2024; 12:00 p.m., ESPN	(1) No. 4	vs. (9) Florida State; Quarterfinals	W 92–67	26–6	18 – Davis	10 – Tied	6 – Cadeau	Capital One Arena (14,920); Washington, D.C.
March 15, 2024; 7:00 p.m., ESPN	(1) No. 4	vs. (4) Pittsburgh; Semifinals	W 72–65	27–6	25 – Davis	11 – Bacot	4 – Trimble	Capital One Arena (18,722); Washington, D.C.
March 16, 2024; 8:30 p.m., ESPN	(1) No. 4	vs. (10) NC State; Championship	L 76–84	27–7	30 – Davis	12 – Bacot	8 – Cadeau	Capital One Arena (19,218); Washington, D.C.
NCAA tournament
March 21, 2024*; 2:45 p.m., CBS	(1 W) No. 5	vs. (16 W) Wagner; First Round	W 90–62	28–7	22 – Davis	15 – Bacot	3 – Tied	Spectrum Center (18,223); Charlotte, NC
March 23, 2024*; 5:30 p.m., CBS	(1 W) No. 5	vs. (9 W) Michigan State; Second Round	W 85–69	29–7	20 – Davis	7 – Tied	4 – Cadeau	Spectrum Center (18,382); Charlotte, NC
March 28, 2024*; 9:39 p.m., CBS	(1 W) No. 5	vs. (4 W) No. 19 Alabama; Sweet Sixteen	L 87–89	29–8	19 – Bacot	12 – Bacot	7 – Davis	Crypto.com Arena (19,625); Los Angeles, CA
*Non-conference game. ^{#}Rankings from AP Poll. (#) Tournament seedings in parentheses. W=West. All times are in Eastern Time.

== Rankings ==
Ranking movements Legend: ██ Increase in ranking ██ Decrease in ranking ( ) = First-place votes
	Week																				
Poll	Pre	1	2	3	4	5	6	7	8	9	10	11	12	13	14	15	16	17	18	19	Final
AP	19	20	14	17	9	9	11	9	8	7	4 (1)	3	3	3	7	10	9	7	4	5	7
Coaches	21	18	14	16	10	9	13	11	9	7	3	3	3	3	5	9	8	7	4	5	6
