= 2024 NCAA Men's Basketball All-Americans =

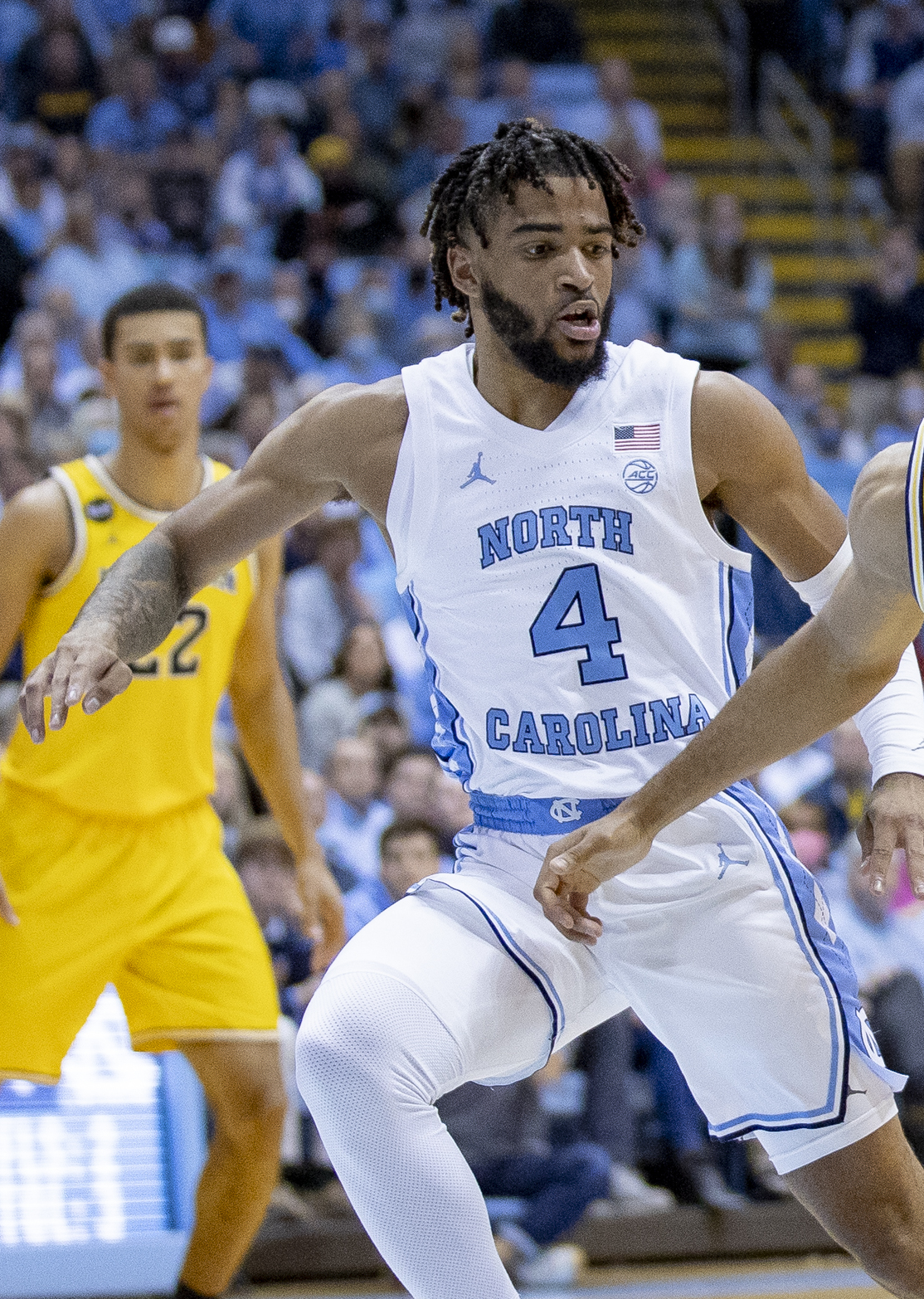
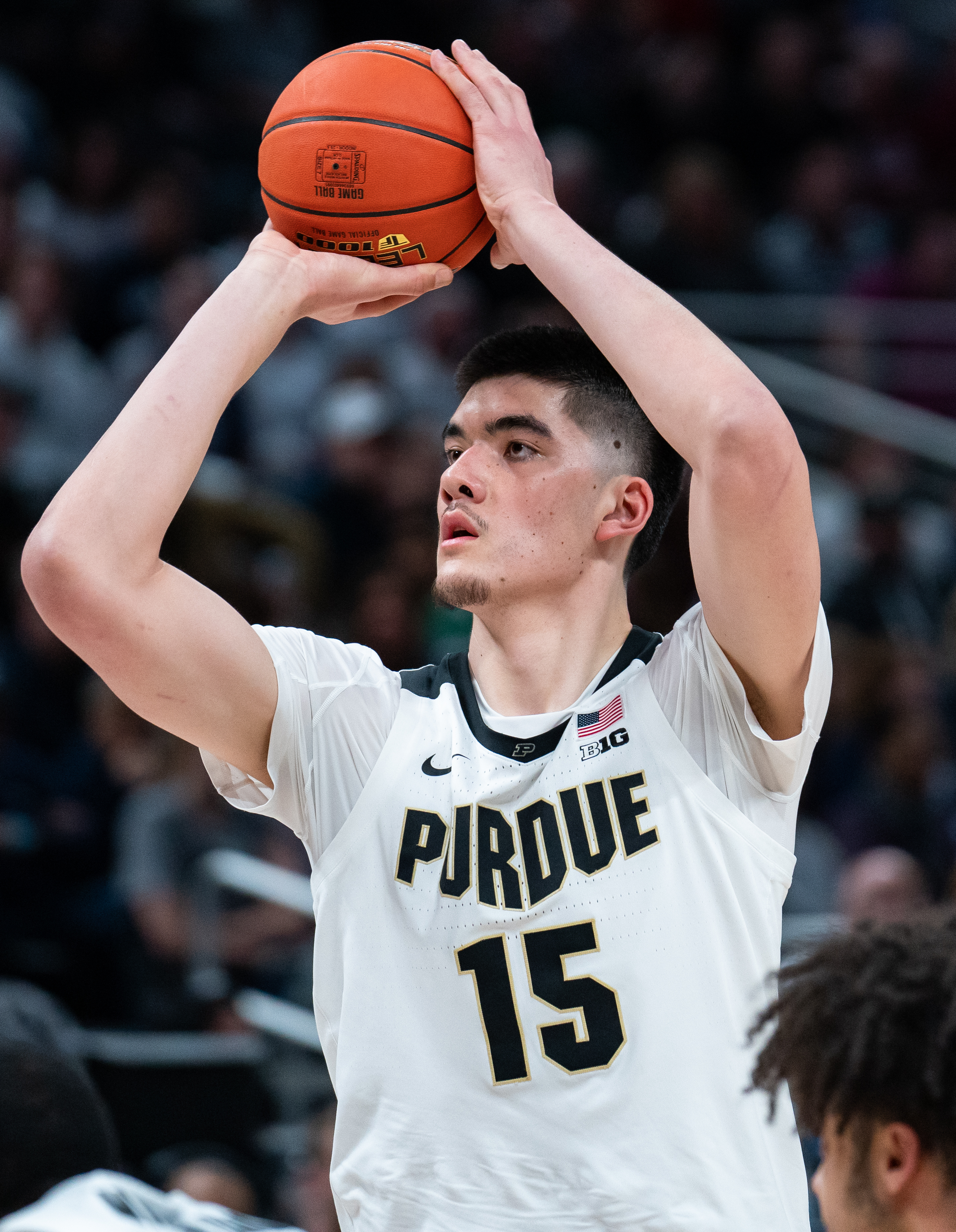
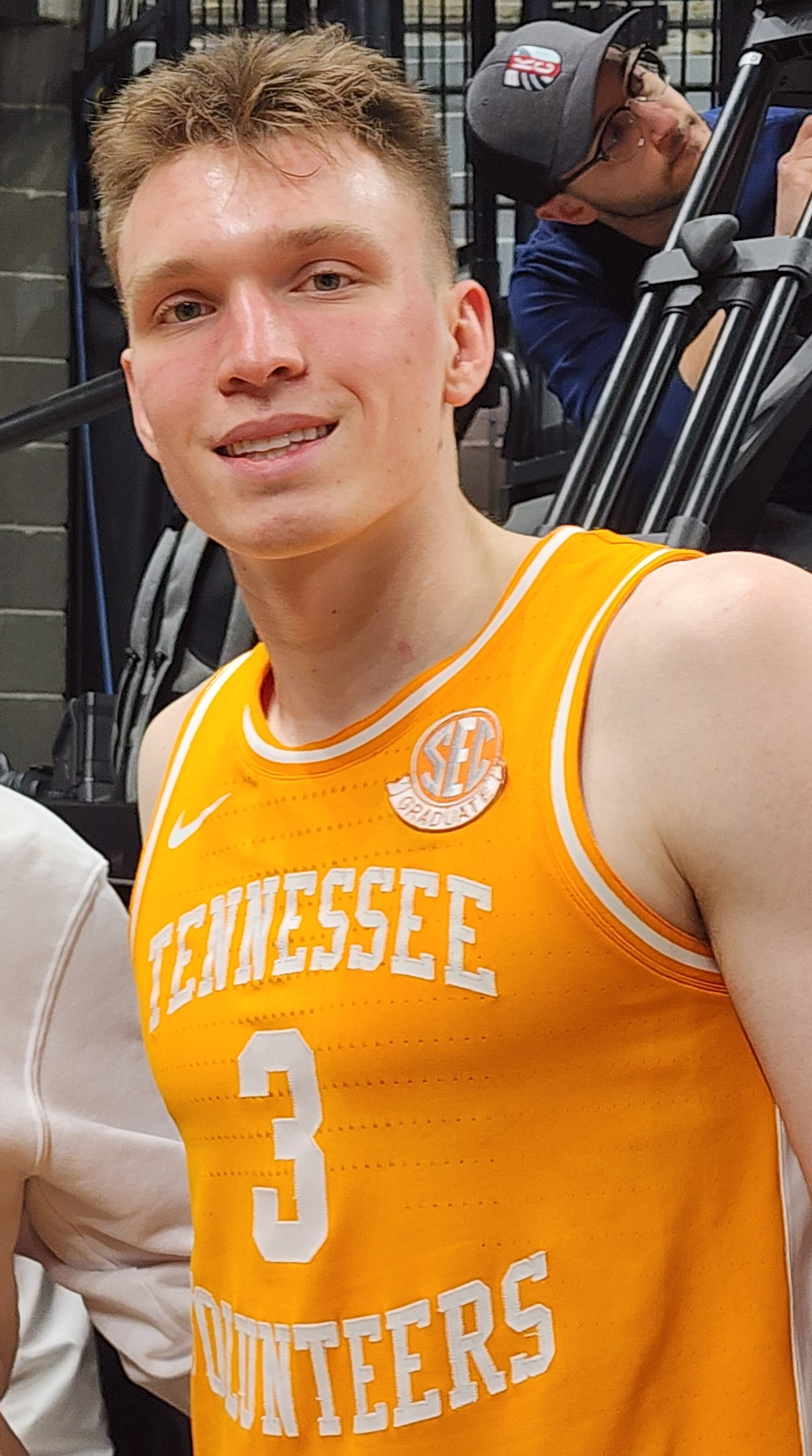
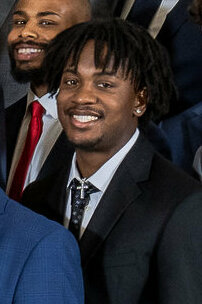
- Members of the 2024 Consensus All-America first team. Clockwise from upper left: Davis, Edey, Newton, Knecht; (not pictured: Shead).
- Awarded for: 2023–24 NCAA Division I men's basketball season

An All-American team is an honorary sports team composed of the best amateur players of a specific season for each team position—who in turn are given the honorific "All-America" and typically referred to as "All-American athletes", or simply "All-Americans". Although the honorees generally do not compete together as a unit, the term is used in U.S. team sports to refer to players who are selected by members of the national media. Walter Camp selected the first All-America team in the early days of American football in 1889. The 2024 NCAA Men's Basketball All-Americans are honorary lists that include All-American selections from the Associated Press (AP), the United States Basketball Writers Association (USBWA), The Sporting News (TSN), and the National Association of Basketball Coaches (NABC) for the 2023–24 NCAA Division I men's basketball season. All selectors choose three teams, while AP and USBWA also list honorable mention selections.

The Consensus 2024 College Basketball All-American team will be determined by aggregating the results of the four major All-American teams as determined by the National Collegiate Athletic Association (NCAA). Since United Press International was replaced by TSN in 1997, the four major selectors have been the aforementioned ones. AP has been a selector since 1948, NABC since 1957 and USBWA since 1960. To earn "consensus" status, a player must win honors based on a point system computed from the four different all-America teams. The point system consists of three points for first team, two points for second team and one point for third team. No honorable mention or fourth team or lower are used in the computation. The top five totals plus ties are first team and the next five plus ties are second team.

== 2024 Consensus All-America team ==
PG – Point guard
SG – Shooting guard
PF – Power forward
SF – Small forward
C – Center

Consensus First Team
Player	Position	Class	Team
R. J. Davis	SG	Senior	North Carolina
Zach Edey	C	Senior	Purdue
Dalton Knecht	SF	Graduate	Tennessee
Tristen Newton	PG	Graduate	UConn
Jamal Shead	PG	Senior	Houston

Consensus Second Team
Player	Position	Class	Team
Hunter Dickinson	C	Senior	Kansas
Kyle Filipowski	PF/C	Sophomore	Duke
DaRon Holmes II	PF	Junior	Dayton
Tyler Kolek	PG	Senior	Marquette
Mark Sears	PG	Senior	Alabama

== Individual All-America teams ==
=== By player ===
Player	School	AP	USBWA	NABC	TSN	CP	Notes
R. J. Davis	North Carolina	1	1	1	1	12	Jerry West Award, ACC Player of the Year
Zach Edey	Purdue	1	1	1	1	12	Naismith Player of the Year, Wooden Award, AP Player of the Year, Oscar Robertson Trophy, NABC Player of the Year, Sporting News Player of the Year, Pete Newell Big Man Award, Kareem Abdul-Jabbar Award, Lute Olson Award, Big Ten Player of the Year
Dalton Knecht	Tennessee	1	1	1	1	12	Julius Erving Award, SEC Player of the Year
Jamal Shead	Houston	1	1	1	1	12	Naismith Defensive Player of the Year, NABC Defensive Player of the Year, Big 12 Player of the Year
Tristen Newton	UConn	1	2	1	1	11	NCAA Final Four Most Outstanding Player, Bob Cousy Award
Tyler Kolek	Marquette	2	1	2	2	9	
Hunter Dickinson	Kansas	2	2	3	2	7	
Kyle Filipowski	Duke	2	2	2	3	7	
DaRon Holmes II	Dayton	2	3	2	2	7	Atlantic 10 co-Player of the Year
Mark Sears	Alabama	2	2	3	2	7	
Caleb Love	Arizona	3	2	2	3	6	Pac-12 Player of the Year
Jaedon LeDee	San Diego State	3		2	2	5	Karl Malone Award
Johni Broome	Auburn	3	3	3	3	4	
Baylor Scheierman	Creighton	3	3	3	3	4	
Antonio Reeves	Kentucky		3		3	2	
Armando Bacot	North Carolina		3			1	
Kevin McCullar Jr.	Kansas			3		1	
Terrence Shannon Jr.	Illinois	3				1	

=== By team ===
All-America Team
All-America Team	First team		Second team		Third team	
All-America Team	Player	School	Player	School	Player	School
Associated Press	R. J. Davis	North Carolina	Hunter Dickinson	Kansas	Johni Broome	Auburn
Associated Press	Zach Edey	Purdue	Kyle Filipowski	Duke	Jaedon LeDee	San Diego State
Associated Press	Dalton Knecht	Tennessee	DaRon Holmes II	Dayton	Caleb Love	Arizona
Associated Press	Tristen Newton	UConn	Tyler Kolek	Marquette	Baylor Scheierman	Creighton
Associated Press	Jamal Shead	Houston	Mark Sears	Alabama	Terrence Shannon Jr.	Illinois
USBWA	R. J. Davis	North Carolina	Hunter Dickinson	Kansas	Armando Bacot	North Carolina
USBWA	Zach Edey	Purdue	Kyle Filipowski	Duke	Johni Broome	Auburn
USBWA	Dalton Knecht	Tennessee	Caleb Love	Arizona	DaRon Holmes II	Dayton
USBWA	Tyler Kolek	Marquette	Tristen Newton	UConn	Antonio Reeves	Kentucky
USBWA	Jamal Shead	Houston	Mark Sears	Alabama	Baylor Scheierman	Creighton
NABC	R. J. Davis	North Carolina	Kyle Filipowski	Duke	Johni Broome	Auburn
NABC	Zach Edey	Purdue	DaRon Holmes II	Dayton	Hunter Dickinson	Kansas
NABC	Dalton Knecht	Tennessee	Tyler Kolek	Marquette	Kevin McCullar Jr.	Kansas
NABC	Tristen Newton	UConn	Jaedon LeDee	San Diego State	Baylor Scheierman	Creighton
NABC	Jamal Shead	Houston	Caleb Love	Arizona	Mark Sears	Alabama
The Sporting News
The Sporting News	R. J. Davis	North Carolina	Hunter Dickinson	Kansas	Johni Broome	Auburn
The Sporting News	Zach Edey	Purdue	DaRon Holmes II	Dayton	Kyle Filipowski	Duke
The Sporting News	Dalton Knecht	Tennessee	Tyler Kolek	Marquette	Caleb Love	Arizona
The Sporting News	Tristen Newton	UConn	Jaedon LeDee	San Diego State	Antonio Reeves	Kentucky
The Sporting News	Jamal Shead	Houston	Mark Sears	Alabama	Baylor Scheierman	Creighton

AP Honorable Mention:

- Armando Bacot, North Carolina
- Keion Brooks Jr., Washington
- Boo Buie, Northwestern
- Devin Carter, Providence
- Donovan Clingan, UConn
- LJ Cryer, Houston
- Tucker DeVries, Drake
- Enrique Freeman, Akron
- P.J. Hall, Clemson
- Graham Ike, Gonzaga
- David Jones, Memphis
- Ryan Kalkbrenner, Creighton
- Tamin Lipsey, Iowa State
- Kevin McCullar Jr., Kansas
- Great Osobor, Utah State
- Antonio Reeves, Kentucky
- Reed Sheppard, Kentucky
- Braden Smith, Purdue
- Cam Spencer, UConn
- Isaiah Stevens, Colorado State
- Vonterius Woolbright, Western Carolina

USBWA Honorable Mention:

- Boo Buie, Northwestern
- LJ Cryer, Houston
- Jaedon LeDee, San Diego State
- Kevin McCullar Jr., Kansas
- Terrence Shannon Jr., Illinois

== Academic All-Americans ==
College Sports Communicators (known before the 2022–23 season as the College Sports Information Directors of America) announced its 2024 Academic All-America team on April 16, 2024.

First Team
Player	School	Class	GPA and major
Max Abmas	Texas	GS	3.81/4.00, Strategic Communication (G)
Brandon Angel	Stanford	Sr.	3.99, Economics
Marcus Domask	Illinois	GS	3.94/3.95, Recreation, Sport, & Tourism
Tyson Degenhart	Boise State	Jr.	3.95, Finance
Cam Spencer	UConn	GS	3.80/3.50, Nonprofit Management

Second Team
Player	School	Class	GPA and major
Oso Ighodaro	Marquette	GS	3.53/3.80, Finance (U) / Business Administration (G)
Pelle Larsson	Arizona	Sr.	3.60, Business Administration
Tamin Lipsey	Iowa State	So.	3.65, Communication Studies
Riley Minix	Morehead State	GS	3.96/4.00, Sports Management
Payton Sandfort	Iowa	Jr.	3.91, Finance

Third Team
Player	School	Class	GPA and major
Jamison Battle	Ohio State	GS	3.59/4.00, Sports Coaching
Max Fiedler	Rice	GS	3.89/3.91, Business Administration (G)
Jaelen House	New Mexico	GS	3.53/3.56, Graduate Studies
Michael Jones	Stanford	GS	3.56/3.63, Statistics
Stevie Mitchell	Marquette	Jr.	3.96, Finance & Information Systems
