= Armando Bacot =

American basketball player (born 2000)

- Bacot with Maccabi Tel Aviv, November 2026

No. 5 – Maccabi Tel Aviv
- Position: Center
- League: Israeli Premier League; EuroLeague

Personal information
- Born: March 6, 2000 (age 26) Richmond, Virginia, U.S.
- Listed height: 6 ft 10 in (2.08 m)
- Listed weight: 240 lb (109 kg)

Career information
- High school: Trinity Episcopal (Richmond, Virginia); IMG Academy (Bradenton, Florida)
- College: North Carolina (2019–2024)
- NBA draft: 2024: undrafted
- Playing career: 2024–present

Career history
- 2024–2025: Memphis Hustle
- 2025–2026: Fenerbahçe
- 2026–present: Maccabi Tel Aviv

Career highlights
- Turkish Super League champion (2026); Turkish Cup winner (2026); Turkish Super Cup winner (2025); 2× Third-team All-American – USBWA (2023, 2024); Third-team All-American – AP, SN (2023); 2× First-team All-ACC (2022, 2023); Second-team All-ACC (2024); Third-team All-ACC (2021); ACC All-Defensive team (2024); McDonald's All-American (2019)
- Stats at NBA.com
- Stats at Basketball Reference
Medals
Men's basketball
Representing the United States
FIBA Americas U18 Championship
Gold medal – first place	2018 Canada	Team

Armando Linwood Bacot Jr. /ˈbeɪkɒt/ (born March 6, 2000) is an American professional basketball player for Maccabi Tel Aviv of the Israeli Premier League and the EuroLeague. He played college basketball for the North Carolina Tar Heels. He holds the program records for double-doubles and career rebounds. Over his 5-year career, Bacot played in a UNC-record 171 games.

== High school career ==
Bacot attended Trinity Episcopal School in his hometown of Richmond, Virginia. As a sophomore, Bacot averaged 11.0 points and 8.2 rebounds per game. As a junior, he averaged 24.5 points and 12 rebounds per game. Before his senior year, Bacot transferred to IMG Academy in Bradenton, Florida. As a senior he averaged 12.4 points, 7.7 rebounds, and 1.8 blocks per game. Bacot played in both the McDonald's All-American Game and 2019 Jordan Brand Classic.

=== Recruiting ===
Bacot was considered a five-star recruit in the 2019 class by ESPN and Rivals, and a four-star recruit by 247Sports. On August 16, 2018, Bacot committed to playing college basketball for North Carolina over offers from Duke, Kansas, Oklahoma State, Villanova, and VCU.

College recruiting
Name	Hometown	School	Height	Weight	Commit date
Armando Bacot; C	Richmond, VA	IMG Academy (FL)	6 ft 10 in (2.08 m)	230 lb (100 kg)	Aug 16, 2018
Armando Bacot; C	Recruit ratings: Rivals: 247Sports: ESPN: (94)				
Overall recruit ranking: Rivals: 27 247Sports: 34 ESPN: 18
Note: In many cases, Scout, Rivals, 247Sports, On3, and ESPN may conflict in their listings of height and weight.; In these cases, the average was taken. ESPN grades are on a 100-point scale.; Sources: "North Carolina 2019 Basketball Commitments". Rivals.; "2019 North Carolina Tar Heels Recruiting Class". ESPN.; "2019 Team Ranking". Rivals.

== College career ==
=== Freshman season (2019–20) ===
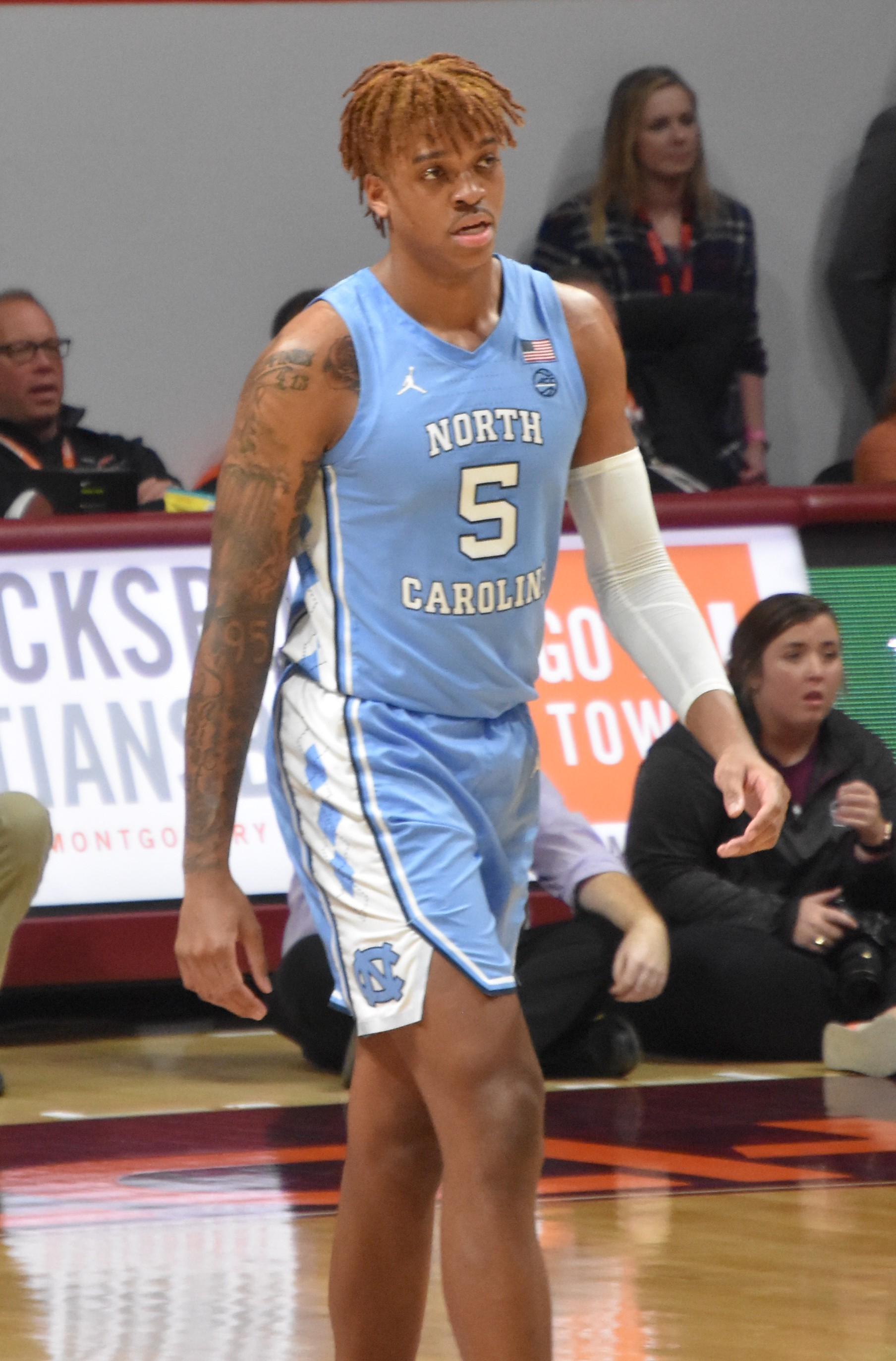
Bacot in 2020

On November 20, 2019, Bacot had 22 points and 14 rebounds in a 75–61 win over Elon. He had 23 points, 12 rebounds and a season-high six blocks in a 78–74 win over Oregon on November 29. In a 74–49 loss to Ohio State on December 4, Bacot suffered a left ankle injury and was expected to miss some time. However, he returned for the following game, a 56–47 loss to Virginia, and scored 11 points. He sat out North Carolina's home victory against Wake Forest on March 3, 2020. As a freshman, Bacot averaged 9.6 points and 8.3 rebounds per game, shooting 46.9 percent from the floor. Armando also had 11 double-doubles, the second most by a Tar Heel freshman.

=== Sophomore season (2020–21) ===
As a sophomore, he averaged 12.3 points and 7.8 rebounds per game, shooting 62.8 percent from the floor. He was named third-team All-Atlantic Coast Conference (ACC). On April 6, 2021, he declared for the 2021 NBA draft while maintaining his college eligibility. He withdrew his name from the draft pool in order to return to Chapel Hill for his junior season.

=== Junior season (2021–22) ===
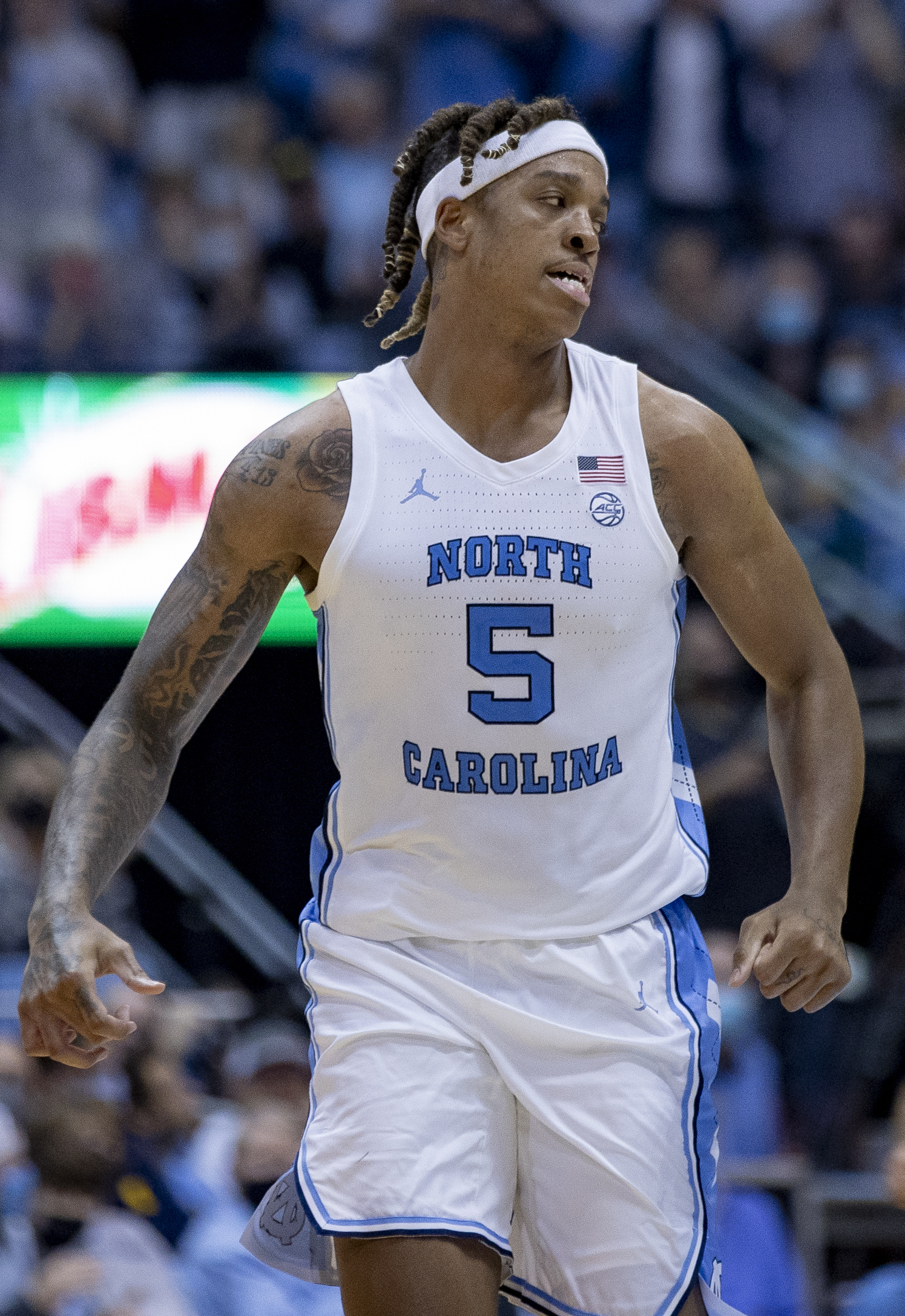
Bacot in 2021

On November 5, 2021, new UNC head coach Hubert Davis named Bacot as team captain alongside sophomores R. J. Davis and Caleb Love. On January 8, 2022, Bacot posted career-highs of 29 points and 21 rebounds in a 78–54 win against Virginia. Bacot picked up 23 double-doubles in the regular season, tying the UNC single-season record previously held by Brice Johnson. Bacot was a key performer in the Tar Heels' 94–81 upset over Duke in Mike Krzyzewski's final game in Cameron Indoor Stadium, scoring 23 points along with 7 rebounds. Four out of the five Tar Heel starters scored twenty-plus points in the game. Following the conclusion of the regular season, he was named First Team All-ACC, and finished runner-up the voting for ACC Player of the Year, behind Wake Forest's Alondes Williams. On March 10, 2022, Bacot recorded his 24th double-double of the season, breaking the school record of 23 that had been set by Brice Johnson in 2016. On March 27, 2022, Bacot tied Tim Duncan's ACC single-season record with his 29th double-double and also passed Duncan (457) for the most rebounds in a single season in ACC history (since 1985–86). Entering the 2022 Final Four, Bacot had 475 rebounds in the 2021–22 season, which was 4th in NCAA history for a single-season (since 1985–86). North Carolina lost in the national championship game to Kansas. Bacot recorded 15 points and 15 rebounds, becoming the first player in tournament history to have a double-double in all six tournament games.

=== Senior season (2022–23) ===
Following the Tar Heels' stunning Final Four run in 2022, Bacot decided to return to Chapel Hill for his senior year. Along with Love, Davis, and Black, Bacot was part of a core for a team that earned the preseason No. 1 ranking. in the AP Poll. Despite the expectations, the team struggled throughout the season, going 23–10 and missing out on the NCAA tournament. Bacot, however, was one of the lone bright spots for the Tar Heels, earning first-team all-ACC honors and being named third team All-America. On January 21, 2023, in an 80–69 win against rivals NC State, Bacot surpassed two Tar Heel records. He passed Tyler Hansbrough for most rebounds in a career at UNC, and Billy Cunningham for most double doubles in program history. On the season, he averaged 15.9 points, 10.4 rebounds, and 1.4 assists per game.

=== Fifth year (2023–24) ===
Following his senior season, Bacot announced that he would use his fifth year of eligibility (granted due to the COVID-19 pandemic), and return to North Carolina for the 2023–24 season. Prior to the start of the season, Bacot was named a preseason All-American by the Associated Press. On November 6, 2023, Bacot scored 25 points and 13 rebounds in a 86–70 win against Radford. On November 12, 2023, Bacot scored 22 points and 20 rebounds in a 90–68 victory over Lehigh. On November 13, 2023, Bacot earned Atlantic Coast Conference (ACC) player of the week honors after averaging 23.5 points and 16.5 rebounds per game. On November 29, 2023, Bacot had another double-double of 22 points and 11 rebounds in a 100–92 win over Tennessee.

On January 2, 2024, Bacot scored his 2000th career point, making him the third player in school history to reach 2000 points and 1000 rebounds. On January 8, 2024, Bacot earned ACC Player of the Week honors for the second consecutive time. On January 17, 2024, Bacot scored 19 points and 7 rebounds in a 86–70 win against Louisville. On February 3, 2024, Bacot scored a double-double (25 points and 10 rebounds) in a 93–84 win against archrival Duke. On February 17, 2024, Bacot scored another double-double of 25 points and 12 rebounds in a 96–81 win against Virginia Tech.

== Professional career ==
=== Memphis Hustle (2024–2025) ===
After going undrafted in the 2024 NBA draft, Bacot joined the Utah Jazz for the 2024 NBA Summer League and on September 6, 2024, he signed with the Memphis Grizzlies. However, he was waived on October 19 and on October 28, he joined the Memphis Hustle.

=== Fenerbahçe (2025–2026) ===
On September 3, 2025, Bacot signed with Fenerbahçe of the Basketbol Süper Ligi (BSL).

On 24 September 2025, he made his debut with the team in the 2025 Turkish Presidential Cup Final against Beşiktaş Gain, Bacot helped Fenerbahçe win the cup (85-83) with 4 points and 4 rebounds. On 1 October 2025, he made his EuroLeague debut against Paris Basketball in a 96-77 victory with 4 points, 1 rebound, and 1 steal in 14 mins.

=== Maccabi Tel Aviv (2026–present) ===
Bacot with Maccabi Tel Aviv in 2026

On August 6, 2026, Bacot signed a two-year deal with Maccabi Tel Aviv of the Israeli Premier League and the EuroLeague.

== National team career ==
Bacot played for the United States under-18 basketball team at the 2018 FIBA Under-18 Americas Championship. He averaged 7.8 points and five rebounds, helping his team win the gold medal.

== Career statistics ==
Legend
GP	Games played	GS	Games started	MPG	Minutes per game
FG%	Field goal percentage	3P%	3-point field goal percentage	FT%	Free throw percentage
RPG	Rebounds per game	APG	Assists per game	SPG	Steals per game
BPG	Blocks per game	PPG	Points per game	**Bold**	Career high

=== College ===
Year	Team	GP	GS	MPG	FG%	3P%	FT%	RPG	APG	SPG	BPG	PPG
2019–20	North Carolina	32	32	24.5	.469	–	.645	8.3	1.2	.5	1.1	9.6
2020–21	North Carolina	29	28	22.7	**.628**	.000	.661	7.8	.8	.7	.9	12.3
2021–22	North Carolina	**39**	**39**	**31.6**	.569	.125	.670	**13.1**	**1.5**	**.8**	**1.7**	**16.3**
2022–23	North Carolina	32	32	30.3	.554	.000	.665	10.4	1.4	.6	1.0	15.9
2023–24	North Carolina	37	37	30.3	.540	**.400**	**.781**	10.3	1.5	.6	1.5	14.5
Career		169	168	28.2	.552	.200	.688	10.1	1.3	.6	1.3	13.9

=== EuroLeague ===
As of match played 13 November 2025

Year	Team	GP	GS	MPG	FG%	3P%	FT%	RPG	APG	SPG	BPG	PPG	PIR
2025–26	Fenerbahçe	8	2	12.5	.591	.500	.769	2.5	.5	.1	.6	4.9	4.0

== Acting ==
In 2023, Bacot made a cameo in a season three episode of Netflix's Outer Banks.

== See also ==
- List of NCAA Division I men's basketball career rebounding leaders
- List of NCAA Division I men's basketball career games played leaders
- List of NCAA Division I men's basketball players with 2,000 points and 1,000 rebounds
