= Caleb Love =

American basketball player (born 2001)

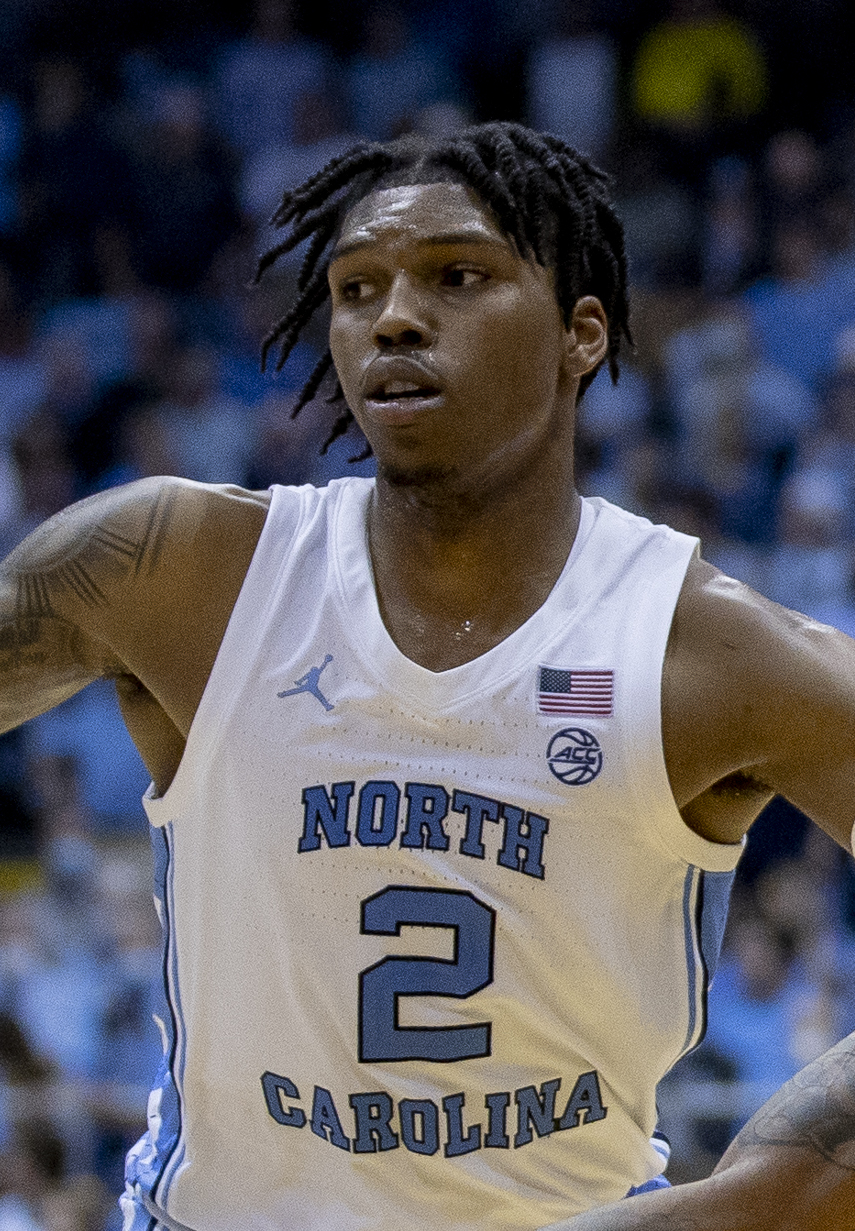
- Love with North Carolina in 2021

No. 8 – Philadelphia 76ers
- Position: Point guard
- League: NBA

Personal information
- Born: September 27, 2001 (age 25) St. Louis, Missouri, U.S.
- Listed height: 6 ft 3 in (1.91 m)
- Listed weight: 212 lb (96 kg)

Career information
- High school: Christian Brothers College (St. Louis, Missouri)
- College: North Carolina (2020–2023); Arizona (2023–2025)
- NBA draft: 2025: undrafted
- Playing career: 2025–present

Career history
- 2025–2026: Portland Trail Blazers
- 2025–2026: →Rip City Remix
- 2026–present: Philadelphia 76ers
- 2026–present: →Delaware Blue Coats

Career highlights
- Second-team All-American – USBWA, NABC (2024); Third-team All-American – AP, SN (2024); Pac-12 Player of the Year (2024); First-team All-Big 12 (2025); First-team All-Pac-12 (2024); ACC All-Freshman Team (2021); McDonald's All-American (2020); Nike Hoop Summit (2020); Mr. Show-Me Basketball (2020)
- Stats at NBA.com
- Stats at Basketball Reference

Caleb Khristopher Love (born September 27, 2001) is an American professional basketball player for the Philadelphia 76ers of the National Basketball Association (NBA), on a two-way contract with the Delaware Blue Coats of the NBA G League. He played college basketball for the North Carolina Tar Heels and the Arizona Wildcats.

== High school career ==
Love attended Christian Brothers College High School in St. Louis, Missouri, and was coached by Justin Tatum, father of NBA player Jayson Tatum. He averaged 18.9 points and 4.3 rebounds per game as a junior as he transitioned to point guard. He led the school to the Class 5 runner-up to Rock Bridge High School. Love scored a career-high 42 points against East St. Louis High School as a senior and also scored 40 points against Cardinal Ritter High School. As a senior, he averaged 26.3 points, 6.5 rebounds, 3.1 assists and 2.6 steals per game and led the team to the Class 5 Final Four. Love was named Mr. Show-Me Basketball and Gatorade Player of the Year in Missouri. He was named McDonald's All-American, becoming the second player from Christian Brothers to be so honored after Larry Hughes in 1997.

=== Recruiting ===
Love was a consensus five-star recruit and one of the top players in the 2020 class, according to major recruiting services. He committed to playing college basketball for North Carolina on October 1, 2019, choosing the Tar Heels over Missouri, Louisville and Kansas, among others. Love was attracted to North Carolina because of coach Roy Williams and the opportunity to play lead guard.

College recruiting
Name	Hometown	School	Height	Weight	Commit date
Caleb Love; PG	St. Louis, MO	Christian Brothers College (MO)	6 ft 3 in (1.91 m)	180 lb (82 kg)	Oct 1, 2019
Caleb Love; PG	Recruit ratings: Rivals: 247Sports: ESPN: (94)				
Overall recruit ranking: Rivals: 17 247Sports: 7 ESPN: 18
Note: In many cases, Scout, Rivals, 247Sports, On3, and ESPN may conflict in their listings of height and weight.; In these cases, the average was taken. ESPN grades are on a 100-point scale.; Sources: "North Carolina 2020 Basketball Commitments". Rivals.; "2020 North Carolina Tar Heels Recruiting Class". ESPN.; "2020 Team Ranking". Rivals.

== College career ==
=== North Carolina ===
==== Freshman ====
In his college debut, Love led all scorers with 17 points and posted four assists and two steals in a 79–60 win over the College of Charleston. On January 20, 2021, Love scored 20 points in an 80–73 win over Wake Forest. On January 25, 2021, Love was named ACC Freshman of the week. On February 6, 2021, Love scored a then career-high 25 points and 7 assist in a 91–87 victory over rival Duke. On February 8, 2021, Love earned his second Atlantic Coast Conference (ACC) Freshman of the week honor. He was named to the ACC All-Freshman Team after averaging 10.5 points and 3.5 assists per game. Following the season, longtime Tar Heel head coach Roy Williams retired. After deliberating, Love decided to return to Chapel Hill for his sophomore season.

==== Sophomore ====
In head coach Hubert Davis' first season in charge after the retirement of Williams, Love was a key piece of a starting lineup that became known as the "Iron Five." The lineup included himself, R. J. Davis, Leaky Black, Oklahoma transfer Brady Manek, and Armando Bacot. In what began as an up-and-down season for both Love and the rest of the team, the "Iron Five" became crucial to the team's success down the stretch in their run to the National Championship game. In total on the season, Love set career highs in three point field goal percentage, games played, and starts, starting all but one of the 39 games played that season. He averaged 15.9 points, 3.4 rebounds, and 3.6 assists per game on the season, averaging 37.1% from the floor and 36% from beyond the three-point line.

In the 2022 NCAA tournament, Love scored 27 of his then career-high 30 points in the second half of a 73–66 win over fourth-seeded UCLA in the Sweet Sixteen. In the following Final Four matchup with the Duke Blue Devils, Love scored 28 points, including a late three-point shot seen as pivotal in the Tar Heels' 81–77 victory. In the Finals, he rolled his ankle and was shooting poorly, but still had a chance to tie the game despite Kansas coming back in the second half. He air-balled a closely guarded step-back three-pointer, and UNC lost the title. He finished the game with 13 points on 5-of-24 shooting.

==== Junior ====
After the late-season success of the prior season, Love, Black, Davis, and Bacot all decided to return for the 2022–23 season. Despite a pre-season No.1 ranking and massive expectations, the season went awry quickly for Love and his teammates. Still, Love was a key piece of the starting lineup and started 32 of the 33 games the team played (his lone appearance off the bench came on UNC's senior night, where tradition dictates that the starting lineup consists of all seniors on the team). The Tar Heels stumbled to a 20–13 record in Hubert Davis's second season. Love, despite shooting worse from the foul line and three-point line in his junior season, set new career highs in overall field-goal percentage (37.8%), points per game (16.7), and rebounds per game (3.7).

Following the season, Love entered the transfer portal, announcing his intentions to play elsewhere in his senior year.

=== Arizona ===
==== Senior ====
After much speculation, Love originally committed to play his senior season at Michigan. However, just over a month after committing to Michigan, Love decommitted from the Wolverines and headed back into transfer portal, reportedly due to an issue with transfer credits. He announced his commitment to the Arizona Wildcats via social media on May 30, 2023.

Love made his Wildcat debut on November 6, 2023, scoring 12 points and dishing out four assists in a 122–59 victory over Morgan State. Love made his return to Cameron Indoor Stadium on November 10 and beat No. 2 Duke 78–73, snapping their 17-game home winning streak. On December 16, Love had a game-high 29 points and six rebounds in a 92–84 loss to No. 3 Purdue, marking Arizona's first loss of the season. On January 6 against Utah, Love had 23 points, six rebounds, and six assists on 60% from the field in a 92–73 victory. The next game against Washington State, Love finished with 28 points and eight rebounds in a tight 73–70 road loss. On January 27, Love went 12-for-18 from the field and scored a career-high 36 points in a 87–78 road victory against Oregon. His 36 points tied the single-game scoring record at Matthew Knight Arena. On February 8, Love recorded his first career double-double in a triple overtime road victory against Utah, finishing with 19 points and 10 rebounds. Against Washington on February 24, Love poured in 28 points and reached 2,000 collegiate points in a 91–75 win.

On March 12, 2024, Love was awarded the Pac-12 Player of the Year Award and became the tenth Arizona Wildcat to win the award. Love averaged a team-high 18.7 points on 43% from the field and 35.2% from three-point range. He added 4.9 rebounds, 3.4 assists, and 1.2 steals in 32.2 minutes played. He helped Arizona earn the No. 2 seed in the West region of the 2024 NCAA Tournament. They advanced to the Sweet 16, where they lost to No. 6 Clemson 77–72, with Love missing all nine of his three-point attempts.

==== Graduate ====
Love announced via his social media accounts on May 29, 2024, that he would withdraw from the 2024 NBA Draft and return to Arizona for his graduate season. He averaged 17.2 points, 4.4 rebounds, 3.4 assists and 1.2 steals per game.

== Professional career ==
On July 1, 2025, after going undrafted in the 2025 NBA Draft, Love signed a two-way contract with the Portland Trail Blazers. On November 21, against the Golden State Warriors, Love scored a career high of 26 points, and tallied seven rebounds, five assists, and one steal in 38 minutes of action off the bench.

On July 5, 2026, Love signed a two-way contract with the Philadelphia 76ers.

== Career statistics ==
Legend
GP	Games played	GS	Games started	MPG	Minutes per game
FG%	Field goal percentage	3P%	3-point field goal percentage	FT%	Free throw percentage
RPG	Rebounds per game	APG	Assists per game	SPG	Steals per game
BPG	Blocks per game	PPG	Points per game	**Bold**	Career high

=== NBA ===
Year	Team	GP	GS	MPG	FG%	3P%	FT%	RPG	APG	SPG	BPG	PPG
2025–26	Portland	49	1	20.7	.388	.318	.735	2.3	2.5	.6	.1	10.4
Career		49	1	20.7	.388	.318	.735	2.3	2.5	.6	.1	10.4

=== College ===
Year	Team	GP	GS	MPG	FG%	3P%	FT%	RPG	APG	SPG	BPG	PPG
2020–21	North Carolina	29	26	27.7	.316	.266	.808	2.6	**3.6**	**1.2**	**.3**	10.5
2021–22	North Carolina	**39**	**38**	34.2	.371	**.360**	.863	3.4	**3.6**	.9	**.3**	15.9
2022–23	North Carolina	33	32	**35.7**	.378	.299	.765	3.7	2.8	1.1	.2	16.7
2023–24	Arizona	36	36	32.3	**.413**	.332	.839	**4.8**	3.4	**1.2**	**.3**	**18.0**
2024–25	Arizona	37	37	34.1	.398	.340	**.889**	4.4	3.4	**1.2**	**.3**	17.2
Career		174	169	33.0	.380	.326	.835	3.8	3.4	1.1	.3	15.9
