= 2022–23 North Carolina Tar Heels men's basketball team =

American college basketball season

2022–23 North Carolina Tar Heels men's basketball
- Conference: Atlantic Coast Conference
- Record: 20–13 (11–9 ACC)
- Head coach: Hubert Davis (2nd season)
- Assistant coaches: Jeff Lebo (2nd season); Sean May (2nd season); Brad Frederick (6th season)
- Home arena: Dean E. Smith Center

2022–23 ACC men's basketball standings
	Conf.				Overall
Team	W		L	PCT	W		L	PCT
No. 16 Miami (FL)	15	–	5	.750	29	–	8	.784
No. 14 Virginia	15	–	5	.750	25	–	8	.758
Clemson	14	–	6	.700	23	–	11	.676
No. 12 Duke †	14	–	6	.700	27	–	9	.750
Pittsburgh	14	–	6	.700	24	–	12	.667
NC State	12	–	8	.600	23	–	11	.676
North Carolina	11	–	9	.550	20	–	13	.606
Wake Forest	10	–	10	.500	19	–	14	.576
Syracuse	10	–	10	.500	17	–	15	.531
Boston College	9	–	11	.450	16	–	17	.485
Virginia Tech	8	–	12	.400	19	–	15	.559
Florida State	7	–	13	.350	9	–	23	.281
Georgia Tech	6	–	14	.300	15	–	18	.455
Notre Dame	3	–	17	.150	11	–	21	.344
Louisville	2	–	18	.100	4	–	28	.125
† 2023 ACC tournament winner Rankings from AP poll

The 2022–23 North Carolina Tar Heels men's basketball team represented the University of North Carolina at Chapel Hill during the 2022–23 NCAA Division I men's basketball season. The team was led by Hubert Davis, who was in his second year as UNC's head coach. The Tar Heels played their home games at the Dean Smith Center in Chapel Hill, as members of the Atlantic Coast Conference.

The Tar Heels, coming off a National Runner-up in the 2022 NCAA tournament, were ranked #1 in the Preseason AP poll, and failed to live up to the lofty expectations the ranking entailed. The team struggled offensively all season, finishing the season with the second-worst 3-point-percentage in program history. The 2022-23 Tar Heels went 1-9 in NET quad 1 games (their only Q1 victory being a home win against #6 Virginia). They finished the season 20–13 overall and 11–9 in ACC play, earning the 7 seed in the ACC Tournament.

On Selection Sunday, the Tar Heels were not picked to be a part of the field for the 2023 NCAA Tournament, and were one of the first four teams left out by the selection committee. By narrowly missing out on a spot in the tournament, the Tar Heels became the first preseason #1-ranked team to miss the tournament since the field expanded to 64 teams in 1985. Following the missed bid, coach Hubert Davis announced via statement that the team would decline an invite to the 2023 NIT, ending their season.

== Previous season ==
In Hubert Davis' first year at the helm, the Tar Heels got off to a rocky start, with blowout losses to Tennessee, Kentucky, Miami, Wake Forest, and Duke (at home). The Tar Heels rounded into form in the latter half of conference play, finishing with a 15–5 record in conference play. The Tar Heels capped the regular season with an upset win over the Blue Devils at Cameron Indoor Stadium in Mike Krzyzewski's final home game. The Tar Heels earned the No. 3 seed and a double-bye in the ACC tournament. They defeated Virginia in the quarterfinals before losing to eventual champions Virginia Tech in the semifinals.

The Tar Heels earned the No. 8 seed in the East Region of the 2022 NCAA tournament. In the tournament, they beat Marquette and upset No. 1 seed in Baylor to earn North Carolina's 35th Sweet Sixteen appearance of all time. The Tar Heels upset No. 4 seed UCLA and beat "Cinderella" team Saint Peter's in the Elite Eight. The Tar Heels earned a record 21st Final Four appearance, where they beat the Blue Devils in the first-ever NCAA Tournament matchup between the rival schools, 81–77, before falling 69–72 against Kansas in the National Championship game.

Starters Brady Manek, Armando Bacot, Caleb Love, R. J. Davis, and Leaky Black earned the nickname "The Iron 5" for their togetherness and strong play as a unit throughout the season, and for the fact they played a large amount of the team's minutes throughout the campaign. Against Duke in Durham, Bacot, Love, Davis, and Manek each scored twenty-plus points in a game, the first time four players went for twenty or more in one game in Carolina basketball history. Head coach Davis became only the second person in history to take the same school to the Final Four as both a player and a coach, joining Kansas' Dick Harp. Davis also became the 10th first-year head coach in history to take his team to the Final Four.

== Offseason ==
After the conclusion of the 2021–22 season, Anthony Harris and Dawson Garcia entered the transfer portal. Garcia announced he would transfer to Minnesota to be closer with family in the wake of the family issues that forced him to miss the latter half of the previous season. Brady Manek also left the team, as the previous season was his final year of collegiate eligibility. Manek had taken advantage of the extra year given out by the NCAA in response to COVID-19 to play for the Tar Heels in 2021–22. Harris committed to transfer to Rhode Island in May, but was unable to enroll at URI due to reported academic issues. Guard Kerwin Walton also announced plans to transfer on May 1, 2022, the last day to enter the portal and maintain eligibility for the following season.

After speculation that he would turn pro and enter the 2022 NBA draft, Armando Bacot confirmed his return in a video for the 2022–23 season on April 13, 2022. A few days later, Leaky Black, R. J. Davis and Caleb Love similarly announced their intentions to return for the 2022–23 season. On June 18, former Northwestern forward Pete Nance announced that he had committed to North Carolina, completing their roster for the 2022–23 season.

=== Departures ===
North Carolina Departures
Name	Number	Pos.	Height	Weight	Year	Hometown	Reason for Departure
Dawson Garcia	13	F	6'11"	235	Sophomore	Prior Lake, MN	Transferred to Minnesota
Anthony Harris	0	G	6'4"	195	RS Sophomore	Woodbridge, VA	Transferred to Rhode Island
Brady Manek	45	F	6'9"	230	Graduate	Harrah, OK	Completed college eligibility
Kerwin Walton	24	G	6'5"	210	Sophomore	Hopkins, MN	Transferred to Texas Tech

=== Incoming transfers ===
North Carolina incoming transfers
Name	Number	Pos.	Height	Weight	Year	Hometown	Previous School	Years Remaining	Date Committed
Pete Nance	32	F	6'11"	225	Graduate	Akron, OH	Northwestern	1	June 18, 2022

=== 2022 Recruiting class ===
College recruiting information
Name	Hometown	School	Height	Weight	Commit date
Jalen Washington; C	Gary, IN	West Side	6 ft 9 in (2.06 m)	205 lb (93 kg)	Jul 9, 2021
Jalen Washington; C	Recruit ratings: Rivals: 247Sports: ESPN: (89)				
Seth Trimble; PG	Menomonee Falls, WI	Menomonee Falls	6 ft 1 in (1.85 m)	175 lb (79 kg)	Jun 23, 2021
Seth Trimble; PG	Recruit ratings: Rivals: 247Sports: ESPN: (87)				
Tyler Nickel; PF	Elkton, VA	East Rockingham	6 ft 8 in (2.03 m)	215 lb (98 kg)	Sep 15, 2021
Tyler Nickel; PF	Recruit ratings: Rivals: 247Sports: ESPN: (82)				
Will Shaver†; C	Birmingham, AL	Oak Mountain	6 ft 8 in (2.03 m)	215 lb (98 kg)	Jun 2, 2021
Will Shaver†; C	Recruit ratings: Rivals: 247Sports: ESPN: (82)				
Overall recruit ranking: Rivals: 17 247Sports: 11
Note: In many cases, Scout, Rivals, 247Sports, On3, and ESPN may conflict in their listings of height and weight.; In these cases, the average was taken. ESPN grades are on a 100-point scale.; Sources: "North Carolina 2021 Basketball Commitments". Rivals.; "2021 North Carolina Tar Heels Recruiting Class". ESPN.; "2021 Team Ranking". Rivals.

† Shaver, a member of the 2022 recruiting class, enrolled early and redshirted during the second half of the 2021–22 season.

== Roster ==
2022–23 North Carolina Tar Heels men's basketball team
Players
Coaches

Pos.	#	Name	Height	Weight	Year	Previous school	Hometown
G	0	Seth Trimble	6 ft 3 in (1.91 m)	192 lb (87 kg)	Fr	Menomonee Falls	Menomonee Falls, WI
G/F	1	Leaky Black	6 ft 9 in (2.06 m)	205 lb (93 kg)	GS	Cox Mill	Concord, NC
G	2	Caleb Love	6 ft 4 in (1.93 m)	200 lb (91 kg)	Jr	Christian Brothers College	St. Louis, MO
G/F	3	Dontrez Styles	6 ft 6 in (1.98 m)	210 lb (95 kg)	So	Kinston	Kinston, NC
G	4	R. J. Davis	6 ft 0 in (1.83 m)	175 lb (79 kg)	Jr	Archbishop Stepinac	White Plains, NY
F/C	5	Armando Bacot	6 ft 11 in (2.11 m)	235 lb (107 kg)	Sr	IMG Academy	Richmond, VA
G	11	D'Marco Dunn	6 ft 5 in (1.96 m)	190 lb (86 kg)	So	Westover	Tucson, AZ
F	13	Jalen Washington	6 ft 10 in (2.08 m)	225 lb (102 kg)	Fr	West Side	Gary, IN
G/F	14	Puff Johnson	6 ft 8 in (2.03 m)	200 lb (91 kg)	Jr	Hillcrest Prep	Moon Township, PA
G	15	Rob Landry (W)	6 ft 4 in (1.93 m)	190 lb (86 kg)	Jr	NCSSM	Greensboro, NC
F	21	Will Shaver	6 ft 10 in (2.08 m)	260 lb (118 kg)	RS Fr	Oak Mountain	Birmingham, AL
F	22	Justin McKoy	6 ft 8 in (2.03 m)	220 lb (100 kg)	Sr	Panther Creek; Virginia	Raleigh, NC
G/F	24	Tyler Nickel	6 ft 7 in (2.01 m)	220 lb (100 kg)	Fr	East Rockingham	Harrisonburg, VA
G	25	Creighton Lebo (W)	6 ft 1 in (1.85 m)	180 lb (82 kg)	Jr	Greenfield	Greenville, NC
G	30	Jackson Watkins (W)	6 ft 1 in (1.85 m)	180 lb (82 kg)	Sr	Collegiate School	Richmond, VA
F	32	Pete Nance	6 ft 11 in (2.11 m)	230 lb (104 kg)	GS	Revere; Northwestern	Akron, OH
F	34	Duwe Farris (W)	6 ft 7 in (2.01 m)	210 lb (95 kg)	Sr	Myers Park	Charlotte, NC
F	40	Beau Maye (W)	6 ft 8 in (2.03 m)	225 lb (102 kg)	Jr	Hough	Huntersville, NC

Head coach

- Hubert Davis (North Carolina)

Assistant coach(es)

- Jeff Lebo (North Carolina)
- Sean May (North Carolina)
- Brad Frederick (North Carolina)

Legend

- (C) Team captain
- (S) Suspended
- (I) Ineligible
- (W) Walk-on
- Injured
- Current redshirt

== Schedule and results ==
Date time, TV	Rank^{#}	Opponent^{#}	Result	Record	High points	High rebounds	High assists	Site (attendance) city, state
Exhibition
October 28, 2022*; 7:30 p.m., ACCNX/ESPN+	No. 1	Johnson C. Smith	W 101–40	–	20 – Love	20 – Bacot	8 – Love	Dean Smith Center; Chapel Hill, NC
Regular Season
November 7, 2022*; 9:00 p.m., ACCN	No. 1	UNC Wilmington	W 69–56	1–0	17 – Tied	9 – Bacot	2 – Nance	Dean Smith Center (19,744); Chapel Hill, NC
November 11, 2022*; 7:00 p.m., ACCRSN	No. 1	College of Charleston	W 102–86	2–0	28 – Bacot	9 – Love	6 – Love	Dean Smith Center (17,892); Chapel Hill, NC
November 15, 2022*; 8:00 p.m., ACCN	No. 1	Gardner–Webb	W 72–66	3–0	20 – Love	10 – Davis	4 – Love	Dean Smith Center (17,200); Chapel Hill, NC
November 20, 2022*; 12:00 p.m., ACCN	No. 1	James Madison	W 80–64	4–0	21 – Davis	23 – Bacot	5 – Davis	Dean Smith Center (19,942); Chapel Hill, NC
November 24, 2022*; 1:00 p.m., ESPN	No. 1	vs. Portland; Phil Knight Invitational Quarterfinals	W 89–81	5–0	28 – Nance	13 – Bacot	5 – Davis	Moda Center (6,229); Portland, OR
November 25, 2022*; 5:30 p.m., ESPN	No. 1	vs. Iowa State; Phil Knight Invitational Semifinals	L 65–70	5–1	15 – Davis	9 – Bacot	3 – Tied	Veterans Memorial Coliseum (4,431); Portland, OR
November 27, 2022*; 3:30 p.m., ESPN	No. 1	vs. No. 18 Alabama; Phil Knight Invitational Consolation	L 101–103 ^{4OT}	5–2	34 – Love	10 – Bacot	4 – Tied	Veterans Memorial Coliseum (1,921); Portland, OR
November 30, 2022*; 9:15 p.m., ESPN	No. 18	at No. 10 Indiana; ACC–Big Ten Challenge	L 65–77	5–3	15 – Nance	12 – Nance	2 – Davis	Simon Skjodt Assembly Hall (17,222); Bloomington, IN
December 4, 2022; 3:00 p.m., ACCN	No. 18	at Virginia Tech	L 72–80	5–4 (0–1)	18 – Tied	10 – Nance	2 – Love	Cassell Coliseum (8,925); Blacksburg, VA
December 10, 2022; 3:15 p.m., ESPN		Georgia Tech	W 75–59	6–4 (1–1)	22 – Davis	13 – Bacot	5 – Love	Dean Smith Center (19,410); Chapel Hill, NC
December 13, 2022*; 7:00 p.m., ESPN2		The Citadel	W 100–67	7–4	17 – Love	11 – Bacot	6 – Love	Dean Smith Center (16,926); Chapel Hill, NC
December 17, 2022*; 3:00 p.m., CBS		vs. No. 23 Ohio State; CBS Sports Classic	W 89–84 ^{OT}	8–4	28 – Bacot	15 – Bacot	7 – Love	Madison Square Garden (20,261); New York, NY
December 21, 2022*; 7:00 p.m., ESPN		vs. Michigan; Jumpman Invitational	W 80–76	9–4	26 – Bacot	5 – Davis	10 – Black	Spectrum Center (19,236); Charlotte, NC
December 30, 2022; 12:00 p.m., ACCN	No. 25	at Pittsburgh	L 74–76	9–5 (1–2)	22 – Bacot	13 – Bacot	3 – Bacot	Petersen Events Center (10,215); Pittsburgh, PA
January 4, 2023; 9:00 p.m., ACCN		Wake Forest; Rivalry	W 88–79	10–5 (2–2)	27 – Davis	9 – Bacot	5 – Bacot	Dean Smith Center (19,031); Chapel Hill, NC
January 7, 2023; 11:30 a.m., ESPN2		Notre Dame	W 81–64	11–5 (3–2)	21 – Bacot	13 – Bacot	4 – Tied	Dean Smith Center (21,750); Chapel Hill, NC
January 10, 2023; 9:00 p.m., ESPN		at No. 13 Virginia	L 58–65	11–6 (3–3)	16 – Davis	6 – Tied	5 – Love	John Paul Jones Arena (14,629); Charlottesville, VA
January 14, 2023; 2:00 p.m., ESPN		at Louisville	W 80–59	12–6 (4–3)	14 – Tied	16 – Bacot	5 – Davis	KFC Yum! Center (14,842); Louisville, KY
January 17, 2023; 7:00 p.m, ACCRSN		Boston College	W 72–64	13–6 (5–3)	20 – Bacot	16 – Bacot	3 – Tied	Dean Smith Center (19,121); Chapel Hill, NC
January 21, 2023; 5:00 p.m., ACCN		NC State; Rivalry	W 80–69	14–6 (6–3)	26 – Davis	18 – Bacot	1 – Tied	Dean Smith Center (21,750); Chapel Hill, NC
January 24, 2023; 9:00 p.m., ESPN		at Syracuse	W 72–68	15–6 (7–3)	21 – Nance	8 – Bacot	5 – Tied	JMA Wireless Dome (20,761); Syracuse, NY
February 1, 2023; 7:00 p.m., ACCN		Pittsburgh	L 64–65	15–7 (7–4)	22 – Love	11 – Bacot	3 – Davis	Dean Smith Center (20,421); Chapel Hill, NC
February 4, 2023; 6:30 p.m., ESPN		at Duke; Rivalry	L 57–63	15–8 (7–5)	14 – Bacot	10 – Tied	5 – Davis	Cameron Indoor Stadium (9,314); Durham, NC
February 7, 2023; 7:00 p.m., ESPN		at Wake Forest; Rivalry	L 85–92	15–9 (7–6)	24 – Love	11 – Bacot	5 – Davis	LJVM Coliseum (11,318); Winston-Salem, NC
February 11, 2023; 2:00 p.m., ESPN2		Clemson	W 91–71	16–9 (8–6)	23 – Love	11 – Bacot	5 – Love	Dean Smith Center (21,750); Chapel Hill, NC
February 13, 2023; 7:00 p.m., ESPN		No. 15 Miami (FL)	L 72–80	16–10 (8–7)	23 – Davis	9 – Black	2 – Tied	Dean Smith Center (19,907); Chapel Hill, NC
February 19, 2023; 1:00 p.m., ESPN		at No. 23 NC State; Rivalry	L 69–77	16–11 (8–8)	23 – Love	14 – Bacot	2 – Tied	PNC Arena (19,500); Raleigh, NC
February 22, 2023; 9:00 p.m., ESPN		at Notre Dame	W 63–59	17–11 (9–8)	16 – Tied	11 – Tied	5 – Nance	Joyce Center (8,183); South Bend, IN
February 25, 2023; 6:00 p.m., ESPN		No. 6 Virginia	W 71–63	18–11 (10–8)	22 – Nance	10 – Davis	4 – Davis	Dean Smith Center (21,750); Chapel Hill, NC
February 27, 2023; 7:00 p.m., ESPN		at Florida State	W 77–66	19–11 (11–8)	19 – Davis	10 – Nance	4 – Tied	Donald L. Tucker Center (7,791); Tallahassee, FL
March 4, 2023; 6:30 p.m., ESPN		Duke; Rivalry	L 57–62	19–12 (11–9)	17 – Tied	11 – Bacot	3 – Tied	Dean Smith Center (21,750); Chapel Hill, NC
ACC Tournament
March 8, 2023; 7:00 p.m., ESPN2	(7)	vs. (10) Boston College; Second round	W 85–61	20–12	22 – Love	6 – Tied	4 – Black	Greensboro Coliseum (17,685); Greensboro, NC
March 9, 2023; 7:00 p.m., ESPN	(7)	vs. (2) No. 13 Virginia; Quarterfinals	L 59–68	20–13	24 – Davis	9 – Black	6 – Love	Greensboro Coliseum (17,772); Greensboro, NC
*Non-conference game. ^{#}Rankings from AP Poll. (#) Tournament seedings in parentheses. All times are in Eastern Time.

== Rankings ==
Ranking movements Legend: ██ Increase in ranking ██ Decrease in ranking — = Not ranked RV = Received votes ( ) = First-place votes
	Week																			
Poll	Pre	1	2	3	4	5	6	7	8	9	10	11	12	13	14	15	16	17	18	Final
AP	1 (47)	1 (44)	1 (47)	18	RV	—	RV	25	—	RV	RV	RV	RV	—	—	—	—	—	—	Not released
Coaches	1 (23)	1 (22)	1 (23)	15	RV	RV	RV	RV	—	RV	RV	RV	RV	—	—	—	—	—	—	—

*AP does not release post-NCAA Tournament rankings
