= R. J. Davis =

American basketball player (born 2001)

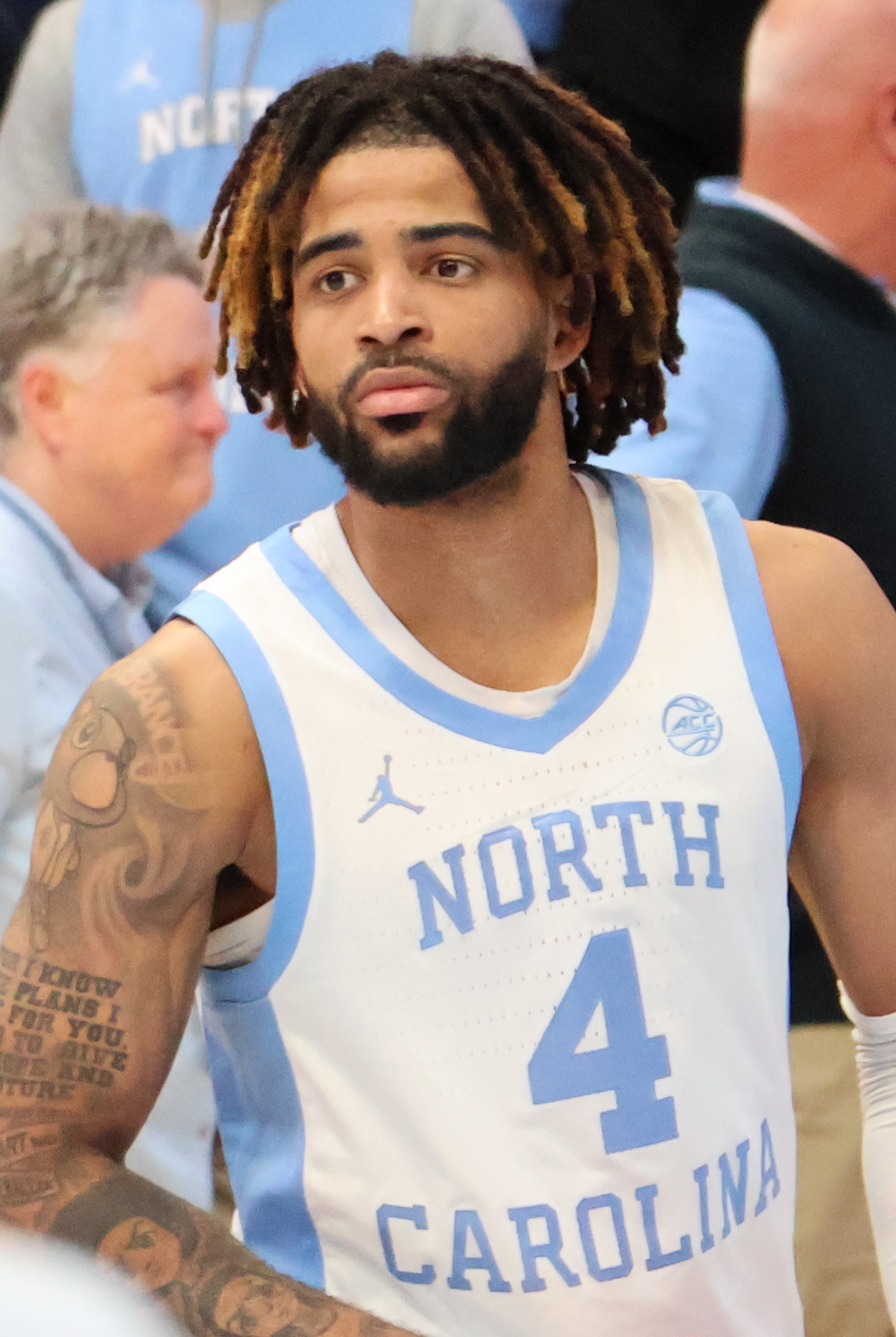
- Davis with North Carolina in 2025

No. 1 – Austin Spurs
- Position: Point guard / shooting guard
- League: NBA G League

Personal information
- Born: October 21, 2001 (age 25) White Plains, New York, U.S.
- Listed height: 6 ft 0 in (1.83 m)
- Listed weight: 180 lb (82 kg)

Career information
- High school: Archbishop Stepinac (White Plains, New York)
- College: North Carolina (2020–2025)
- NBA draft: 2025: undrafted
- Playing career: 2025–present

Career history
- 2025–2026: South Bay Lakers
- 2026–present: Austin Spurs

Career highlights
- NBA G League All-Rookie Team (2026); Consensus first-team All-American (2024); ACC Player of the Year (2024); First-team All-ACC (2024); Second-team All-ACC (2025); Jerry West Award (2024); No. 4 honored by North Carolina Tar Heels; McDonald's All-American (2020); Mr. New York Basketball (2020)
- Stats at NBA.com
- Stats at Basketball Reference

Robert Davis Jr. (born October 21, 2001) is an American professional basketball player for the Austin Spurs of the NBA G League. He played college basketball for the North Carolina Tar Heels.

== High school career ==
Davis attended Archbishop Stepinac High School in White Plains, New York. He led the Crusaders to a 27–5 record, the CHSAA city championship, and the New York State Federation championship during his sophomore season. However, he suffered an injury as a sophomore which kept him from playing in the summer circuit. As a junior, Davis averaged 25.4 points, seven rebounds, four assists and 1.7 steals per game. Davis was named The Journal News Westchester/Putnam Player of the Year and helped the team reach the city championship game. He averaged 26.5 points, eight rebounds, 5.3 assists and 2.1 steals per game as a senior. Davis was named a McDonald's All-American as well as Mr. New York Basketball.

=== Recruiting ===
Considered a four-star recruit, Davis was ranked 197th by 247Sports in early 2019, but rose in most recruiting services' and was ranked No. 43 in the Class of 2020 according to ESPN. Davis committed to playing college basketball for North Carolina in October 2019, choosing the Tar Heels over Georgetown, Marquette and Pittsburgh.

College recruiting
Name	Hometown	School	Height	Weight	Commit date
R. J. Davis; PG	White Plains, NY	Archbishop Stepinac (NY)	6 ft 1 in (1.85 m)	165 lb (75 kg)	Oct 21, 2019
R. J. Davis; PG	Recruit ratings: Rivals: 247Sports: ESPN: (87)				
Overall recruit ranking: Rivals: 52 247Sports: 60 ESPN: 43
Note: In many cases, Scout, Rivals, 247Sports, On3, and ESPN may conflict in their listings of height and weight.; In these cases, the average was taken. ESPN grades are on a 100-point scale.; Sources: "North Carolina 2020 Basketball Commitments". Rivals.; "2020 North Carolina Tar Heels Recruiting Class". ESPN.; "2020 Team Ranking". Rivals.

== College career ==
=== Freshman ===
As a freshman, Davis averaged 8.4 points, 2.3 rebounds, and 1.9 assists per game while shooting 35.0 percent from the floor. He was named to the All-Atlantic Coast Conference Academic Team. He made ten starts in 29 appearances in his freshman year.

=== Sophomore ===
A starter all season, Davis was a member of the "Iron Five" starting lineup that led North Carolina on an improbable run to the 2022 National Championship game alongside Armando Bacot, Brady Manek, Caleb Love, and Leaky Black. On November 13, 2021, he scored a then-career-high 26 points in a 94–87 win against Brown. Davis broke his career high in the second round of the NCAA Tournament, scoring 30 points in the Tar Heels' 93–86 upset victory against Baylor. He became the first Tar Heel to score 30 points and post 5 rebounds and 5 assists in an NCAA tournament game.

=== Junior ===
After the Tar Heels' run to the national championship game in the season prior, RJ Davis, Leaky Black, Armando Bacot, and Caleb Love all decided to return to Chapel Hill.

Despite the team's preseason No.1 ranking, the Tar Heels struggled all season, missing the NCAA tournament and going 20–13 overall. Davis started all but one game in the 2022–23 season, and his lone appearance off the bench came on UNC's Senior Day, where it is tradition for all seniors being honored to start the game. He improved off of many of his statistics from the previous season, averaging 16.1 points, 5.1 rebounds, and 3.2 assists per game.

=== Senior ===
Davis announced that he was returning to Carolina for his senior season on March 24, 2023. On January 22, Davis scored a then career-high 36 points in a game against Wake Forest. On February 26, Davis recorded a new career high with 42 points in a win against Miami. Davis' 42 points were the most ever scored at the Dean Smith Center, and the most scored by a North Carolina player since Shammond Williams scored 42 in 1998. Davis was named a member of the 2024 First-team All-ACC team and the ACC Player of the Year. He was also named a member of the first-team AP All-American team and became the first North Carolina player to win the Jerry West Award.

Fifth Year

On May 1, 2024, Davis announced he was returning to Carolina for his fifth year of eligibility granted because of the shortened 2020–21 season due to the COVID-19 pandemic.

In February 2025, Davis was named one of 10 players as a candidate for the 2025 Jerry West Award. He won the Jerry West Award.

== Professional career ==
After going undrafted in the 2025 NBA draft, Davis joined the Los Angeles Lakers for the 2025 NBA Summer League. On July 26, 2025, Davis signed a contract with the Lakers. He was waived prior to the start of the regular season on October 18, then announced as a part of the NBA G League's South Bay Lakers training camp roster on October 29.

Davis joined the San Antonio Spurs for the 2026 NBA Summer League, and on September 25, 2026, he signed a contract with the Spurs. He was waived by the Spurs on October 13, 2026.

== Career statistics ==
Legend
GP	Games played	GS	Games started	MPG	Minutes per game
FG%	Field goal percentage	3P%	3-point field goal percentage	FT%	Free throw percentage
RPG	Rebounds per game	APG	Assists per game	SPG	Steals per game
BPG	Blocks per game	PPG	Points per game	**Bold**	Career high

=== College ===
Year	Team	GP	GS	MPG	FG%	3P%	FT%	RPG	APG	SPG	BPG	PPG
2020–21	North Carolina	29	10	22.3	.350	.323	.821	2.3	1.9	.7	.1	8.4
2021–22	North Carolina	**39**	**39**	33.9	.425	.367	.833	4.3	**3.6**	1.0	.2	13.5
2022–23	North Carolina	33	32	**35.0**	**.438**	.362	**.881**	**5.1**	3.2	1.1	.1	16.1
2023–24	North Carolina	37	37	34.8	.428	**.398**	.873	3.6	3.5	**1.2**	**.2**	**21.2**
2024–25	North Carolina	37	37	34.2	.413	.354	.873	3.4	**3.6**	1.0	.1	17.2
Career		175	155	32.4	.418	.367	.861	3.8	3.2	1.0	.1	15.6

== See also ==
- List of NCAA Division I men's basketball career games played leaders
