= UConn Huskies basketball =

UConn Huskies basketball may refer to:

- UConn Huskies men's basketball
- UConn Huskies women's basketball
