= Hubert Davis =

American basketball player and coach (born 1970)

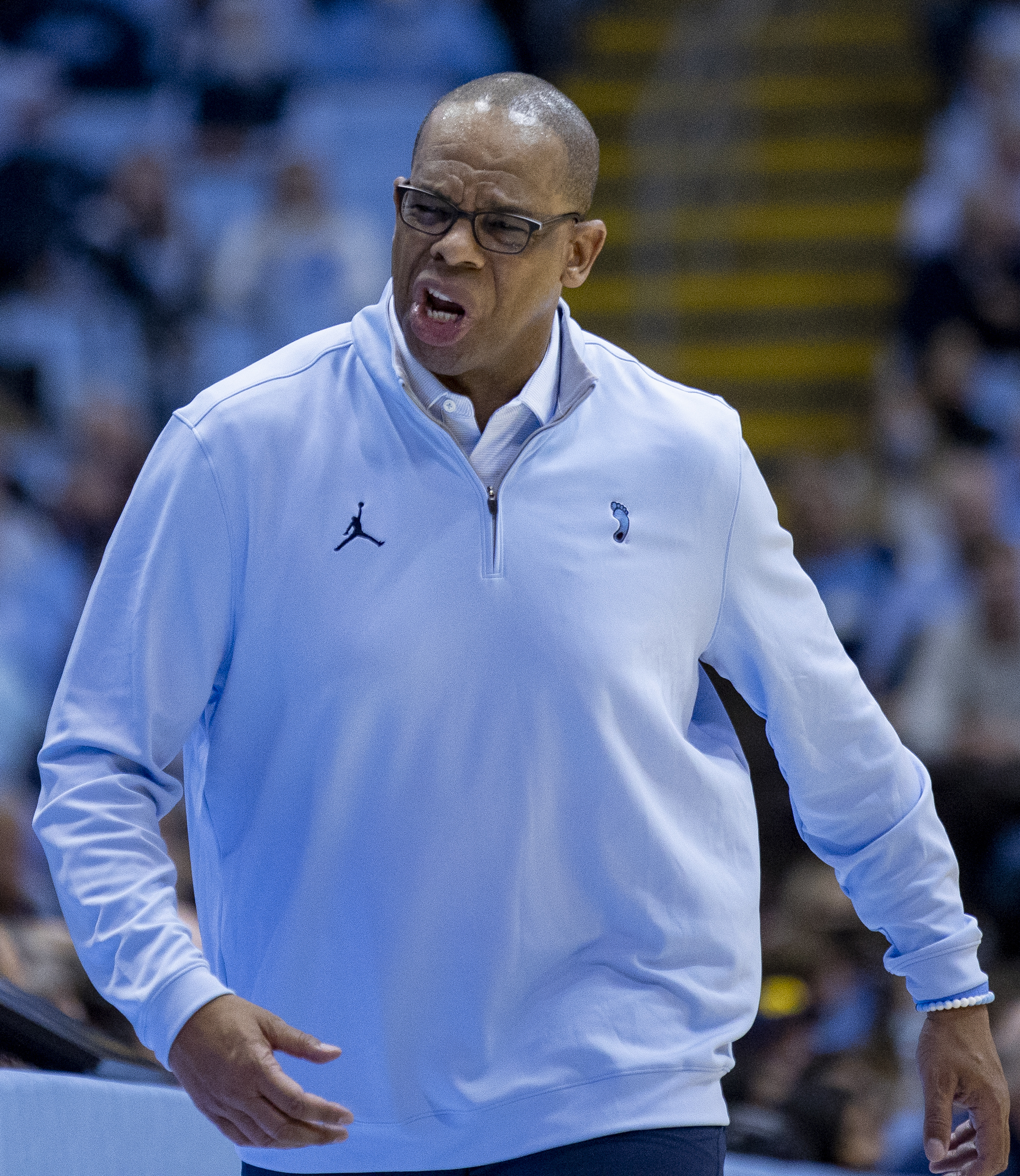
- Davis in 2021

Personal information
- Born: May 17, 1970 (age 56) Winston-Salem, North Carolina, U.S.
- Listed height: 6 ft 5 in (1.96 m)
- Listed weight: 183 lb (83 kg)

Career information
- High school: Lake Braddock Secondary (Burke, Virginia)
- College: North Carolina (1988–1992)
- NBA draft: 1992: 1st round, 20th overall pick
- Drafted by: New York Knicks
- Playing career: 1992–2004
- Position: Shooting guard / point guard
- Number: 44, 24
- Coaching career: 2012–present

Career history

Playing
- 1992–1996: New York Knicks
- 1996–1997: Toronto Raptors
- 1997–2001: Dallas Mavericks
- 2001–2002: Washington Wizards
- 2002–2004: Detroit Pistons
- 2004: New Jersey Nets

Coaching
- 2012–2021: North Carolina (assistant)
- 2021–2026: North Carolina

Career highlights
- As player: Second-team All-ACC (1992); Coach Wooden "Keys to Life" Award (2008); As assistant coach: NCAA champion (2017); As head coach: NCAA Division I regional champion – Final Four (2022); ACC regular season champion (2024); ACC Coach of the Year (2024)

Career NBA statistics
- Points: 5,583 (8.2 ppg)
- Rebounds: 1,045 (1.5 rpg)
- Assists: 1,172 (1.7 apg)
- Stats at NBA.com
- Stats at Basketball Reference
Medals
Men's basketball
Representing United States
Summer Universiade
Gold medal – first place	1991 Sheffield	National team

Hubert Ira Davis Jr. (born May 17, 1970) is an American former professional basketball player and former head basketball coach for the North Carolina Tar Heels. Before his coaching career, Davis played for North Carolina from 1988 to 1992 and in the National Basketball Association (NBA) for the New York Knicks, Toronto Raptors, Dallas Mavericks, Washington Wizards, Detroit Pistons, and New Jersey Nets from 1992 to 2004. He holds the franchise single-season and career three-point field goal shooting percentage records for the Knicks. He is the nephew of Walter Davis, another former Tar Heel and NBA player.

Davis served as an assistant coach for the Tar Heels from 2012 until his elevation to head coach in 2021 following the retirement of Roy Williams. He was fired following the 2025–26 season.

== Early life and education ==
Davis attended Lake Braddock Secondary School in Burke, Virginia, averaging 28.0 points per game his senior year. He went on to the University of North Carolina, where he holds the record for the highest career three-point percentage in school history. In his junior year, he helped lead the team to its first Final Four appearance since winning the national championship in 1982. Davis graduated in 1992 with a degree in Criminal Justice, after averaging 21.4 points per game in his senior season.

== NBA career ==
The New York Knicks selected Davis with the 20th overall pick in the 1992 NBA draft. He made the winning free throws after Hue Hollins called a disputed foul against Scottie Pippen in Game 5 of the 1994 Eastern Conference semi-finals against the Chicago Bulls, giving the Knicks an 87–86 win (the Knicks went on to win the series in seven games). Davis established the Knicks franchise records for single-season (.476, 1995–96) and career (.449) three-point shooting percentages.

Davis remained with New York for four years, and was traded to the Toronto Raptors before the 1996–97 season. After Toronto, Davis spent time with the Dallas Mavericks, Washington Wizards, Detroit Pistons, and New Jersey Nets. Davis established the Mavericks franchise records for single-season (.491, 1999–2000) and career (.454) three-point shooting percentages. Davis played his final NBA game in 2004, finishing with career averages of 8.2 points, 1.5 rebounds and 1.7 assists per game. Davis's 44.09% NBA career three-point shot percentage ranks him second behind Steve Kerr (45.40%).

== Sports analyst ==
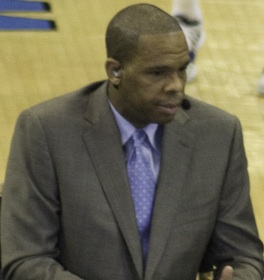
Davis on an ESPN College GameDay broadcast in 2008

Following his playing career, Davis began working for ESPN as a college basketball analyst in the 2007–2008 season. During his time at ESPN, he served as a studio analyst for the network's coverage of college basketball and was a panelist on College Gameday. He left ESPN to return to Chapel Hill as an assistant coach following the 2011–2012 season.

== Coaching career ==
Prior to the 2012–13 season, UNC head coach Roy Williams hired Davis as an assistant. Davis also served as head coach of UNC's junior varsity basketball team, one of the only junior varsity teams remaining in college basketball. UNC's junior varsity program is a long-standing program tradition, and several former JV players have gone on to be walk-ons for the varsity team.

Davis was on the bench for the Tar Heels 2017 NCAA Men's Basketball tournament run that concluded with a 71–65 win over Gonzaga in the National Championship game.

Following the retirement of Williams, Davis was named the 19th head coach in program history, and became the first African-American to lead the program. The move was initially met with some criticism, as Davis had never been a head coach at any level. Despite this, Williams had been grooming him for a head coaching job much in the same way that Dean Smith had mentored Williams during Williams' time as a Tar Heel assistant coach from 1978 to 1988.

Davis recorded his first career win in his first game as head coach. The Tar Heels beat Loyola (MD) 83–67 at home in the Dean Smith Center to open the season. On February 21, 2022, Davis's Tar Heels defeated Louisville to give the first-year head coach his 20th victory of the year. Davis became the fourth ACC head coach to win twenty games in his debut season in the past twenty-five years with the victory. Previous Tar Heel coaches Matt Doherty (2000–01), and Bill Guthridge (1997–98) are two of the other three coaches to reach the twenty-win mark in their debut seasons, winning 26 and 34 games respectively. Davis's Tar Heels capped off a 23–8 regular season with a 94–81 victory over Duke in Mike Krzyzewski's final home game at Cameron Indoor Stadium.

Davis's Tar Heels went 1–1 in his first ACC tournament as head coach, and earned an Eastern regional 8th seed in the 2022 NCAA tournament. After cruising to a 95–63 win over 9-seed Marquette in the first round, the Tar Heels upset the East's number one seed and reigning national champions, the Baylor Bears, in the second round. The Tar Heels hung on and won the game 93–86 in overtime after losing a 25-point second-half lead. The victory secured Davis's first sweet sixteen berth as head coach and the school's 30th overall, the most by any program in Division I history. After a 73–66 victory over 4th seed UCLA Bruins in the Sweet Sixteen, Davis and his Tar Heels advanced to the Elite Eight where they defeated the St. Peter's Peacocks 69–49 to earn a trip to the Final Four. In the national semi-final game, the Tar Heels matched up against arch rivals Duke for the first time in NCAA tournament history. The Tar Heels defeated the Blue Devils 81–77 in what was Coach K's final game. However, in the national championship game, Davis' Tar Heels were defeated by the Kansas Jayhawks, 72–69.

Due to the Tar Heels' success in his first year as head coach, Davis became one of the few college basketball figures to have gone to a Final Four as a player (1991), an assistant coach (2016 and 2017), and as a head coach (2022).

After leading the Tar Heels to a 17-3 conference record and winning the ACC regular season championship, Davis was named the 2024 ACC Coach of the Year.

UNC fired Davis at the end of the 2026 season, following a loss in the first round of the 2026 NCAA Tournament.

== Personal life ==
Davis and his wife Leslie have three children: Elijah, Bobbie Grace and Micah. Davis is cousins with current Brooklyn Nets player Drake Powell. Davis' aunt is Powell's grandmother.

== Career playing statistics ==
Legend
GP	Games played	GS	Games started	MPG	Minutes per game
FG%	Field goal percentage	3P%	3-point field goal percentage	FT%	Free throw percentage
RPG	Rebounds per game	APG	Assists per game	SPG	Steals per game
BPG	Blocks per game	PPG	Points per game	**Bold**	Career high

*	Led the league

=== NBA ===
==== Regular season ====
Year	Team	GP	GS	MPG	FG%	3P%	FT%	RPG	APG	SPG	BPG	PPG
1992–93	New York	50	2	16.8	.438	.316	.796	1.1	1.7	.4	**.1**	5.4
1993–94	New York	56	27	23.8	.471	.402	.825	1.2	2.9	**.7**	**.1**	11.0
1994–95	New York	**82***	4	20.7	.480	.455	.808	1.3	1.8	.4	**.1**	10.0
1995–96	New York	74	14	24.0	**.486**	.476	.868	1.7	1.4	.4	**.1**	10.7
1996–97	Toronto	36	0	17.3	.402	.229	.739	1.1	.9	.3	**.1**	5.0
1997–98	Dallas	81	**30**	**29.4**	.456	.439	.836	**2.1**	1.9	.5	**.1**	**11.1**
1998–99	Dallas	50*	21	27.6	.438	.451	.880	1.7	1.8	.4	**.1**	9.1
1999–2000	Dallas	79	15	23.0	.468	.491*	.870	1.7	1.8	.3	.0	7.4
2000–01	Dallas	51	7	24.7	.443	.436	.854	**2.1**	1.2	.6	.0	7.3
2000–01	Washington	15	11	28.7	.479	**.526**	.905	2.0	**3.3**	.4	.0	10.2
2001–02	Washington	51	17	24.2	.448	.452	.762	1.5	2.1	.5	**.1**	7.2
2002–03	Detroit	43	1	7.6	.392	.333	.833	.8	.7	.1	.0	1.8
2003–04	Detroit	3	0	7.7	.000	.000	–	.0	.3	.0	.0	.0
2003–04	New Jersey	14	0	3.9	.111	–	**1.000**	.6	.2	.1	.0	.3
Career		685	149	22.1	.458	.441	.837	1.5	1.7	.4	.1	8.2

==== Playoffs ====
Year	Team	GP	GS	MPG	FG%	3P%	FT%	RPG	APG	SPG	BPG	PPG
1993	New York	7	0	13.7	**.560**	.500	.667	.9	.7	**.9**	.0	4.4
1994	New York	**23**	**7**	17.2	.364	.286	.719	.9	**1.1**	.2	.1	5.3
1995	New York	11	0	16.7	.357	.370	**1.000**	.6	.8	.1	**.5**	4.2
1996	New York	8	0	18.1	.548	**.526**	.818	**1.5**	.6	.0	.0	**6.6**
Career		49	7	16.8	.409	.373	.750	.9	.9	.2	.2	5.1

=== College ===
Year	Team	GP	GS	MPG	FG%	3P%	FT%	RPG	APG	SPG	BPG	PPG
1988–89	North Carolina	**35**	0	7.1	.512	.308	.774	.8	.3	.1	.0	3.3
1989–90	North Carolina	34	6	21.3	.446	.396	.797	1.8	1.5	1.0	.2	9.6
1990–91	North Carolina	**35**	20	24.3	**.521**	**.489**	**.835**	**2.4**	**1.9**	.9	**.3**	13.3
1991–92	North Carolina	33	**30**	**33.2**	.508	.429	.828	2.3	1.6	**1.3**	.2	**21.4**
Career		137	56	21.3	.498	.435	.819	1.8	1.3	.8	.2	11.8

=== Records ===
- New York Knicks single-season 3-point field goal percentage (.476, 1995–96)
- Dallas Mavericks single-season 3-point field goal percentage (.491, 1999–2000)
- New York Knicks career 3-point field goal percentage (.449)
- Dallas Mavericks career 3-point field goal percentage (.454)

== Head coaching record ==
Record table
Season	Team	Overall	Conference	Standing	Postseason
North Carolina Tar Heels (Atlantic Coast Conference) (2021–2026)
2021–22	North Carolina	29–10	15–5	T–2nd	NCAA Division I Runner-up
2022–23	North Carolina	20–13	11–9	7th	Declined NIT invitation
2023–24	North Carolina	29–8	17–3	1st	NCAA Division I Sweet 16
2024–25	North Carolina	23–14	13–7	T–4th	NCAA Division I Round of 64
2025–26	North Carolina	24–9	12–6	T–4th	NCAA Division I Round of 64
North Carolina:		125–54 (.698)	68–30 (.694)		
Total:		125–54 (.698)			
National champion Postseason invitational champion Conference regular season champion Conference regular season and conference tournament champion Division regular season champion Division regular season and conference tournament champion Conference tournament champion

== See also ==
- List of NBA career 3-point field goal percentage leaders
