= 2021–22 North Carolina Tar Heels men's basketball team =

American college basketball season

2021–22 North Carolina Tar Heels men's basketball

NCAA tournament, Runner-up

National Championship Game, L 69–72 vs. Kansas
- Conference: Atlantic Coast Conference

Ranking
- Coaches: No. 2
- Record: 29–10 (15–5 ACC)
- Head coach: Hubert Davis (1st season)
- Assistant coaches: Jeff Lebo (1st season); Sean May (1st season); Brad Frederick (5th season)
- Home arena: Dean E. Smith Center

2021–22 ACC men's basketball standings
	Conf.				Overall
Team	W		L	PCT	W		L	PCT
No. 9 Duke	16	–	4	.800	32	–	7	.821
North Carolina	15	–	5	.750	29	–	10	.744
Notre Dame	15	–	5	.750	24	–	11	.686
Miami (FL)	14	–	6	.700	26	–	11	.703
Wake Forest	13	–	7	.650	25	–	10	.714
Virginia	12	–	8	.600	21	–	14	.600
Virginia Tech †	11	–	9	.550	23	–	13	.639
Florida State	10	–	10	.500	17	–	14	.548
Syracuse	9	–	11	.450	16	–	17	.485
Clemson	8	–	12	.400	17	–	16	.515
Louisville	6	–	14	.300	13	–	19	.406
Boston College	6	–	14	.300	13	–	20	.394
Pittsburgh	6	–	14	.300	11	–	21	.344
Georgia Tech	5	–	15	.250	12	–	20	.375
NC State	4	–	16	.200	11	–	21	.344
† 2022 ACC tournament winner Rankings from AP poll

The 2021–22 North Carolina Tar Heels men's basketball team represented the University of North Carolina at Chapel Hill during the 2021–22 NCAA Division I men's basketball season. The team was coached by Hubert Davis, in his first season as UNC's head coach after the retirement of longtime coach Roy Williams. The Tar Heels played their home games at the Dean Smith Center in Chapel Hill, North Carolina, as members of the Atlantic Coast Conference.

They finished the season 29–10 overall and 15–5 in ACC play to finish in a tie for second place. As the third seed in the ACC tournament, they defeated sixth seed Virginia in the quarterfinals before losing to seventh seed and eventual champions Virginia Tech in the semifinals. They earned an at-large bid to the NCAA tournament and were the eighth seed in the East Region. After advancing to the Final Four, Carolina beat Duke in their first and only meeting in the NCAA Tournament. This was be the final game of Coach K's career. In the National Championship game, Carolina was defeated by the Kansas.

== Previous season ==
The Tar Heels finished the 2020–21 season 18–11, 10–6 in ACC play to finish in a tie for fifth place. On February 27, 2021, head coach Roy Williams won his 900th career game in a win over Florida State, becoming the 5th and fastest Division 1 men's head coach to reach the milestone. On March 6, 2021, UNC completed a season sweep over rival Duke in a 91–73 win. Following the win, Williams kissed the Smith Center court, causing speculation of possible retirement. He later said it was because of the team's 10–1 home record. As the No. 6 seed in the ACC tournament, they defeated Notre Dame and Virginia Tech, before losing to Florida State in the semifinals. The Virginia Tech win would end up as Williams' 903rd and last win as a coach. North Carolina received an at-large bid to the NCAA tournament as a No. 8 seed and would lose in the first round to 9th-seeded Wisconsin in what would be Roy Williams' last game. Following the season, Williams announced he would retire after 18 years as head coach of North Carolina.

== Offseason ==
On April 1, 2021, Williams announced his retirement. He stated that he did not feel like he was the "right man for the job anymore". ESPN's Seth Greenberg suspected the changing culture of college basketball and "constantly re-recruiting your players, as opposed to mentoring them" played a part in Williams' decision. Following the announcement, athletic director Bubba Cunningham and chancellor Kevin Guskiewicz started the process of searching for the next head coach. CBS Sports' Matt Norlander said "The best job in college basketball just opened". On April 5, 2021, UNC hired former player and assistant coach Hubert Davis as the next head coach. The next day, Davis was formally introduced at an introductory press conference.

=== Roster changes ===
Following UNC's loss to Wisconsin in the 2021 NCAA tournament, Sports Illustrated's Quierra Luck reported, "Carolina will have some transfers; a considerably high number for UNC", and Inside Carolina's Sherrell McMillan reported the offseason would be "ominous".

Three days later, freshman center Walker Kessler announced that he was entering the NCAA's transfer portal. Inside Carolina reported that Kessler's decision was a "basketball decision only". On April 12, 2021, Kessler announced that he would transfer to Auburn for the 2021-22 season.

On March 24, 2021, freshman forward/center Day'Ron Sharpe declared for the 2021 NBA draft. On April 6, 2021 sophomore Armando Bacot also declared for the NBA draft, citing his intentions to "test the waters". On June 21, 2021 Bacot formally withdrew from the NBA draft process, signaling his return to UNC for his junior season in a tweet.

Redshirt junior Sterling Manley, walk-on senior Walker Miller, and senior forward Garrison Brooks all announced intentions to graduate and transfer. Brooks transferred to Mississippi State on April 15. On June 19, Miller announced he would be pursuing a graduate transfer at Monmouth University, and would be coached there by another former Tar Heel player in King Rice. Manley eventually pulled his name from the transfer portal and decided to turn professional. After graduation, guard Andrew Platek eventually put his name into the transfer portal, and enrolled at Siena College in his home state of New York.

Coach Davis was active in the transfer portal to mitigate these losses. On April 10, 2021, Virginia transfer Justin McKoy chose the Tar Heels. He was followed on April 16 by Oklahoma forward Brady Manek. On July 8, 2021, the Tar Heels picked up another transfer when former Marquette forward Dawson Garcia, a Big East All-Freshman team selection for the 2020–2021 season, committed to the Tar Heels. His addition was made official on July 9, when the school issued a press release indicating his signing and arrival in Chapel Hill.

=== Departures ===
North Carolina departures
Name	Number	Pos.	Height	Weight	Year	Hometown	Reason for departure
Andrew Platek	3	G	6'4"	205	Senior	Guilderland, NY	Graduated and transferred to Siena
Day'Ron Sharpe	11	F/C	6'11"	265	Freshman	Greenville, NC	Declared for the 2021 NBA draft
Walker Kessler	13	F/C	7'1"	245	Freshman	Newnan, GA	Transferred to Auburn
Garrison Brooks	15	F	6'10"	240	Senior	Lafayette, AL	Graduated and transferred to Mississippi State
Sterling Manley	21	F	6'11"	250	(redshirt) Junior	Pickerington, OH	Graduated
Walker Miller	22	F	6'11"	235	Senior	Greensboro, NC	Graduated and transferred to Monmouth
K. J. Smith	30	G	6'2"	170	(redshirt) Senior	Calabasas, CA	Graduated

=== Incoming transfers ===
North Carolina incoming transfers
Name	Number	Pos.	Height	Weight	Year	Hometown	Previous school	Years remaining	Date eligible
Dawson Garcia	13	F	6'11"	235	Sophomore	Prior Lake, MN	Marquette	4	October 1, 2021
Justin McKoy	22	F	6'8"	220	Junior	Raleigh, NC	Virginia	3	October 1, 2021
Brady Manek	45	F	6'9"	230	Graduate	Harrah, OK	Oklahoma	1	October 1, 2021

=== 2021 recruiting class ===
College recruiting
Name	Hometown	School	Height	Weight	Commit date
Dontrez Styles; SF	Kinston, NC	Kinston	6 ft 7 in (2.01 m)	205 lb (93 kg)	Apr 18, 2020
Dontrez Styles; SF	Recruit ratings: Rivals: 247Sports: ESPN: (84)				
D'Marco Dunn; SG	Tucson, AZ	Westover (NC)	6 ft 4 in (1.93 m)	180 lb (82 kg)	Sep 30, 2020
D'Marco Dunn; SG	Recruit ratings: Rivals: 247Sports: ESPN: (85)				
Overall recruit ranking: Rivals: 35 247Sports: 38
Note: In many cases, Scout, Rivals, 247Sports, On3, and ESPN may conflict in their listings of height and weight.; In these cases, the average was taken. ESPN grades are on a 100-point scale.; Sources: "North Carolina 2021 Basketball Commitments". Rivals.; "2021 North Carolina Tar Heels Recruiting Class". ESPN.; "2021 Team Ranking". Rivals.

== Roster ==
2021–22 North Carolina Tar Heels men's basketball team
Players
Coaches

Pos.	#	Name	Height	Weight	Year	Previous school	Hometown
G	0	Anthony Harris (I)	6 ft 4 in (1.93 m)	195 lb (88 kg)	RS So	Paul VI Catholic	Woodbridge, VA
G/F	1	Leaky Black	6 ft 8 in (2.03 m)	200 lb (91 kg)	Sr	Cox Mill	Concord, NC
G	2	Caleb Love (C)	6 ft 4 in (1.93 m)	195 lb (88 kg)	So	Christian Brothers College	St. Louis, MO
G/F	3	Dontrez Styles	6 ft 6 in (1.98 m)	210 lb (95 kg)	Fr	Kinston	Kinston, NC
G	4	R. J. Davis (C)	6 ft 0 in (1.83 m)	175 lb (79 kg)	So	Archbishop Stepinac	White Plains, NY
F/C	5	Armando Bacot (C)	6 ft 10 in (2.08 m)	240 lb (109 kg)	Jr	IMG Academy	Richmond, VA
G	11	D'Marco Dunn	6 ft 4 in (1.93 m)	185 lb (84 kg)	Fr	Westover	Tucson, AZ
F	13	Dawson Garcia	6 ft 11 in (2.11 m)	235 lb (107 kg)	So	Prior Lake; Marquette	Prior Lake, MN
G	14	Puff Johnson	6 ft 8 in (2.03 m)	205 lb (93 kg)	So	Hillcrest Prep	Moon Township, PA
G	15	Rob Landry (W)	6 ft 4 in (1.93 m)	185 lb (84 kg)	So	NCSSM	Greensboro, NC
F/C	21	Will Shaver (redshirt)	6 ft 9 in (2.06 m)	245 lb (111 kg)	Fr	Oak Mountain	Birmingham, AL
F	22	Justin McKoy	6 ft 8 in (2.03 m)	220 lb (100 kg)	Jr	Panther Creek; Virginia	Raleigh, NC
G	24	Kerwin Walton	6 ft 5 in (1.96 m)	210 lb (95 kg)	So	Hopkins	Hopkins, MN
G	25	Creighton Lebo (W)	6 ft 1 in (1.85 m)	170 lb (77 kg)	So	Greenfield	Greenville, NC
G	30	Jackson Watkins (W)	6 ft 1 in (1.85 m)	180 lb (82 kg)	Jr	Collegiate School	Richmond, VA
F	34	Duwe Farris (W)	6 ft 6 in (1.98 m)	215 lb (98 kg)	Jr	Myers Park	Charlotte, NC
F	35	Ryan McAdoo (W)	6 ft 5 in (1.96 m)	210 lb (95 kg)	RS Sr	Saint Andrew's	Boca Raton, FL
F	45	Brady Manek	6 ft 9 in (2.06 m)	230 lb (104 kg)	GS	Harrah; Oklahoma	Harrah, OK

Head coach

- Hubert Davis (North Carolina)

Assistant coach(es)

- Jeff Lebo (North Carolina)
- Sean May (North Carolina)
- Brad Frederick (North Carolina)

Legend

- (C) Team captain
- (S) Suspended
- (I) Ineligible
- (W) Walk-on
- Injured
- Current redshirt

- ^1 Rhonda John-Davis, the Trinidad and Tobago netball and basketball international, was mistakenly listed as being a member of the squad instead of the similarly named R. J. Davis.
- ^2 Will Shaver, a member of North Carolina's 2022 recruiting class, enrolled a semester early due to the Tar Heels having an extra scholarship available. He will redshirt for the remainder of the 2021–22 season.

== Schedule and results ==
Date time, TV	Rank^{#}	Opponent^{#}	Result	Record	High points	High rebounds	High assists	Site (attendance) city, state
Exhibition
November 5, 2021*; 7:30 p.m., ACCNX	No. 19	Elizabeth City State	W 83–55	–	17 – Garcia	7 – Black	5 – Tied	Dean Smith Center (18,061); Chapel Hill, NC
Regular season
November 9, 2021*; 7:00 p.m., ACCN	No. 19	Loyola (MD)	W 83–67	1–0	22 – Love	9 – Garcia	5 – Davis	Dean Smith Center (14,992); Chapel Hill, NC
November 12, 2021*; 9:00 p.m., ACCN	No. 19	Brown	W 94–87	2–0	26 – Davis	10 – Bacot	6 – Davis	Dean Smith Center (16,854); Chapel Hill, NC
November 16, 2021*; 8:30 p.m., CBSSN	No. 18	at College of Charleston	W 94–83	3–0	24 – Bacot	12 – Bacot	6 – Love	TD Arena (5,203); Charleston, SC
November 20, 2021*; 4:00 p.m., ESPNews	No. 18	vs. No. 6 Purdue; Hall of Fame Tip Off semifinal	L 84–93	3–1	26 – Garcia	8 – Garcia	4 – Tied	Mohegan Sun Arena (9,176); Uncasville, CT
November 21, 2021*; 3:30 p.m., ESPN	No. 18	vs. No. 17 Tennessee; Hall of Fame Tip Off third place game	L 72–89	3–2	16 – Bacot	12 – Bacot	4 – Davis	Mohegan Sun Arena (9,100); Uncasville, CT
November 23, 2021*; 7:00 p.m., ACCRSN		UNC Asheville	W 72–53	4–2	22 – Bacot	11 – Black	5 – Love	Dean Smith Center (15,710); Chapel Hill, NC
December 1, 2021*; 9:15 p.m., ESPN		No. 24 Michigan; ACC/Big Ten Challenge	W 72–51	5–2	22 – Love	14 – Bacot	4 – Love	Dean Smith Center (19,938); Chapel Hill, NC
December 5, 2021; 3:00 p.m., ESPN		at Georgia Tech	W 79–62	6–2 (1–0)	23 – Davis	13 – Bacot	5 – Tied	McCamish Pavilion (6,217); Atlanta, GA
December 11, 2021*; 8:00 p.m., ACCN		Elon	W 80–63	7–2	22 – Tied	8 – Black	3 – Black	Dean Smith Center (16,607); Chapel Hill, NC
December 14, 2021*; 7:00 p.m., ESPN2		Furman	W 74–61	8–2	20 – Garcia	12 – Bacot	7 – Davis	Dean Smith Center (14,342); Chapel Hill, NC
December 18, 2021*; 3:00 p.m., CBS		vs. No. 4 UCLA; CBS Sports Classic	Canceled due to COVID-19 issues within UCLA program					T-Mobile Arena; Paradise, NV
December 18, 2021*; 5:30 p.m., CBS		vs. No. 21 Kentucky; CBS Sports Classic	L 69–98	8–3	22 – Bacot	10 – Bacot	3 – Davis	T-Mobile Arena (12,117); Paradise, NV
December 21, 2021*; 7:00 p.m., ACCN		Appalachian State	W 70–50	9–3	16 – Bacot	11 – Manek	5 – Love	Dean Smith Center (19,386); Chapel Hill, NC
January 2, 2022; 1:00 p.m., ESPN2		at Boston College	W 91–65	10–3 (2–0)	22 – Love	11 – Bacot	5 – Black	Conte Forum (5,516); Chestnut Hill, MA
January 5, 2022; 9:00 p.m., ESPN2		at Notre Dame	L 73–78	10–4 (2–1)	21 – Bacot	17 – Bacot	5 – Davis	Edmund P. Joyce Center (6,259); South Bend, IN
January 8, 2022; 1:00 p.m., ESPN		Virginia	W 74–58	11–4 (3–1)	29 – Bacot	21 – Bacot	5 – Tied	Dean Smith Center (20,638); Chapel Hill, NC
January 15, 2022; 8:00 p.m., ACCN		Georgia Tech	W 88–65	12–4 (4–1)	29 – Bacot	12 – Bacot	6 – Davis	Dean Smith Center (18,568); Chapel Hill, NC
January 18, 2022; 7:00 p.m., ACCN		at Miami (FL)	L 57–85	12–5 (4–2)	15 – Bacot	12 – Bacot	3 – 3 Tied	Watsco Center (5,979); Coral Gables, FL
January 22, 2022; 8:00 p.m., ACCN		at Wake Forest; Rivalry	L 76–98	12–6 (4–3)	22 – Manek	12 – Bacot	3 – Tied	LJVM Coliseum (11,898); Winston-Salem, NC
January 24, 2022; 8:00 p.m., ACCN		Virginia Tech; Rescheduled from Dec. 29, 2021	W 78–68	13–6 (5–3)	22 – Love	19 – Bacot	5 – Love	Dean Smith Center (19,357); Chapel Hill, NC
January 26, 2022; 7:00 p.m., ACCRSN		Boston College	W 58–47	14–6 (6–3)	16 – Love	18 – Bacot	5 – Black	Dean Smith Center (17,237); Chapel Hill, NC
January 29, 2022; 2:00 p.m., ACCN		NC State; Rivalry	W 100–80	15–6 (7–3)	21 – Love	13 – Bacot	5 – Love	Dean Smith Center (21,750); Durham, NC
February 1, 2022; 8:00 p.m., ACCN		at Louisville	W 90–83 ^{OT}	16–6 (8–3)	24 – Manek	22 – Bacot	6 – Love	KFC Yum! Center (13,386); Louisville, KY
February 5, 2022; 6:00 p.m., ESPN		No. 9 Duke; Rivalry	L 67–87	16–7 (8–4)	21 – Manek	6 – Tied	4 – Love	Dean Smith Center (21,750); Chapel Hill, NC
February 8, 2022; 6:00 p.m., ACCN		at Clemson	W 79–77	17–7 (9–4)	24 – Bacot	10 – Bacot	6 – Davis	Littlejohn Coliseum (7,470); Clemson, SC
February 12, 2022; 2:00 p.m., ESPN		Florida State	W 94–74	18–7 (10–4)	18 – Love	14 – Bacot	6 – Love	Dean Smith Center (20,348); Chapel Hill, NC
February 16, 2022; 8:00 p.m., ACCN		Pittsburgh	L 67–76	18–8 (10–5)	19 – Love	10 – Manek	4 – Bacot	Dean Smith Center (17,270); Chapel Hill, NC
February 19, 2022; 4:00 p.m., ESPN2		at Virginia Tech	W 65–57	19–8 (11–5)	21 – Love	15 – Bacot	7 – Love	Cassell Coliseum (9,825); Blacksburg, VA
February 21, 2022; 7:00 p.m., ESPN		Louisville	W 70–63	20–8 (12–5)	17 – Manek	15 – Bacot	5 – Love	Dean Smith Center (18,618); Chapel Hill, NC
February 26, 2022; 2:00 p.m., ESPN		at NC State; Rivalry	W 84–74	21–8 (13–5)	28 – Bacot	18 – Bacot	5 – Manek	PNC Arena (16,704); Raleigh, NC
February 28, 2022; 7:00 p.m., ESPN		Syracuse	W 88–79 ^{OT}	22–8 (14–5)	22 – Manek	18 – Bacot	7 – Black	Dean Smith Center (21,750); Chapel Hill, NC
March 5, 2022; 6:00 p.m., ESPN		at No. 4 Duke; Rivalry	W 94–81	23–8 (15–5)	23 – Bacot	11 – Manek	5 – Love	Cameron Indoor Stadium (9,314); Durham, NC
ACC Tournament
March 10, 2022; 9:30 p.m., ESPN	(3) No. 25	vs. (6) Virginia; Quarterfinals	W 63–43	24–8	21 – Manek	11 – Bacot	6 – Davis	Barclays Center (15,994); Brooklyn, NY
March 11, 2022; 9:30 p.m., ESPN	(3) No. 25	vs. (7) Virginia Tech; Semifinals	L 59–72	24–9	19 – Bacot	14 – Bacot	4 – Tied	Barclays Center (15,994); Brooklyn, NY
NCAA tournament
March 17, 2022*; 4:30 p.m., TBS	(8 E)	vs. (9 E) Marquette; First Round	W 95–63	25–9	28 – Manek	11 – Manek	12 – Davis	Dickies Arena (12,964); Fort Worth, TX
March 19, 2022*; 12:10 p.m., CBS	(8 E)	vs. (1 E) No. 4 Baylor; Second Round	W 93–86 ^{OT}	26–9	30 – Davis	16 – Bacot	6 – Davis	Dickies Arena (13,300); Fort Worth, TX
March 25, 2022*; 9:40 p.m., CBS	(8 E)	vs. (4 E) No. 11 UCLA; Sweet Sixteen	W 73–66	27–9	30 – Love	15 – Bacot	4 – Love	Wells Fargo Center (20,136); Philadelphia, PA
March 27, 2022*; 5:05 p.m., CBS	(8 E)	vs. (15 E) Saint Peter's; Elite Eight	W 69–49	28–9	20 – Bacot	22 – Bacot	5 – Black	Wells Fargo Center (20,235); Philadelphia, PA
April 2, 2022; 8:49 p.m., TBS	(8 E)	vs. (2 W) No. 9 Duke; Final Four/Rivalry	W 81–77	29–9	28 – Love	21 – Bacot	4 – Davis	Caesars Superdome (70,602); New Orleans, LA
April 4, 2022; 9:20 p.m., TBS	(8 E)	vs. (1 MW) No. 3 Kansas; National Championship	L 69–72	29–10	15 – Tied	15 – Bacot	2 – Tied	Caesars Superdome (69,423); New Orleans, LA
*Non-conference game. ^{#}Rankings from AP Poll. (#) Tournament seedings in parentheses. All times are in Eastern Time.

== Rankings ==
Ranking movements Legend: ██ Increase in ranking ██ Decrease in ranking — = Not ranked RV = Received votes
	Week																			
Poll	Pre	1	2	3	4	5	6	7	8	9	10	11	12	13	14	15	16	17	18	Final
AP	19	18	RV	RV	RV	RV	RV	—	—	—	RV	—	—	—	—	—	—	25	RV	Not released
Coaches	20	20*	RV	—	RV	RV	—	—	—	—	RV	—	—	—	RV	—	RV	RV	RV	2

*Coaches did not release a week 1 poll.
