= 2023–24 Atlantic Coast Conference men's basketball season =

- League: NCAA Division I
- Sport: Basketball
- Duration: November 6, 2023 – March 9, 2024
- Teams: 15
- Total attendance: 2,533,732
- TV partner(s): ACC Network, ESPN, The CW Sports

NBA Draft
- Top draft pick: Bub Carrington, Pittsburgh
- Picked by: Portland Trail Blazers, 14th overall

2023–24 NCAA Division I men's basketball season
- Season champions: North Carolina
- Runners-up: Duke
- Season MVP: R. J. Davis – North Carolina
- Top scorer: R. J. Davis – 21.06 ppg

ACC tournament
- Champions: NC State
- Finals MVP: D. J. Burns – NC State

Atlantic Coast Conference men's basketball seasons
- ← 2022–23 2024–25 →

2023–24 ACC men's basketball standings
	Conf.				Overall
Team	W		L	PCT	W		L	PCT
No. 7 North Carolina	17	–	3	.850	29	–	8	.784
No. 9 Duke	15	–	5	.750	27	–	9	.750
Virginia	13	–	7	.650	23	–	11	.676
Pittsburgh	12	–	8	.600	22	–	11	.667
Wake Forest	11	–	9	.550	21	–	14	.600
No. 14 Clemson	11	–	9	.550	24	–	12	.667
Syracuse	11	–	9	.550	20	–	12	.625
Virginia Tech	10	–	10	.500	19	–	15	.559
Florida State	10	–	10	.500	17	–	16	.515
No. 10 NC State †	9	–	11	.450	26	–	15	.634
Boston College	8	–	12	.400	20	–	16	.556
Notre Dame	7	–	13	.350	13	–	20	.394
Georgia Tech	7	–	13	.350	14	–	18	.438
Miami (FL)	6	–	14	.300	15	–	17	.469
Louisville	3	–	17	.150	8	–	24	.250
† 2024 ACC tournament winner Rankings from AP Poll

The 2023–24 Atlantic Coast Conference men's basketball season began with practices in October 2023, followed by the start of the 2023–24 NCAA Division I men's basketball season in November. Conference play began in December 2023 and concluded on March 9, 2024. The 2024 ACC men's basketball tournament was held at the Capital One Arena in Washington, D.C. from March 12 to March 16, 2024. This was the 70th season of Atlantic Coast Conference basketball.

North Carolina finished as regular season champions with a 17–3 conference record. They finished two games ahead of second place Duke. The title was North Carolina's thirty-third in program history, extending their ACC record. They reached the final of the ACC tournament but were defeated by tenth-seed NC State. As tenth-seed, NC State became the lowest seeded team to win the ACC Tournament in its history. The ACC sent five teams to the NCAA tournament and the teams finished with a record of 12–5 in the tournament. NC State was again the cinderella and advanced the furthest out of any team as an eleventh seed. They advanced to the Final Four, but lost to Purdue.

== Head coaches ==
=== Coaching changes ===
- On January 19, 2023, Mike Brey announced that the 2022–23 season would be his last at Notre Dame. He finished twenty-four seasons at the helm with a 483–280 record. Micah Shrewsberry was hired as the new head coach on March 23, 2023.
- On March 10, 2023, Georgia Tech fired Josh Pastner after seven seasons. Damon Stoudamire was announced as the new head coach on March 13, 2023.
- The 2022–23 season was Jim Boeheim's last at the helm of Syracuse. Boeheim was head coach at Syracuse for forty-seven years and had over one thousand wins as a college coach. He is one of only two coaches to surpass that mark. His retirement was announced on the same day as the announcement of Adrian Autry as the new head coach.

=== Coaches ===
Team	Head coach	Previous job	Years at school	Record at school	ACC record	ACC titles	NCAA tournaments	NCAA Final Fours	NCAA Championships
Boston College	Earl Grant	Charleston	3	29–37	15–25	0	0	0	0
Clemson	Brad Brownell	Wright State	14	241–177	117–117	0	3	0	0
Duke	Jon Scheyer	Duke (Associate Head Coach)	2	27–9	14–6	1	1	0	0
Florida State	Leonard Hamilton	Washington Wizards	22	426–265	193–169	1	11	0	0
Georgia Tech	Damon Stoudamire	Boston Celtics (Assistant)	1	0–0	0–0	0	0	0	0
Louisville	Kenny Payne	New York Knicks (Assistant)	2	4–28	2–18	0	0	0	0
Miami	Jim Larrañaga	George Mason	13	255–149	120–101	1	6	2	0
NC State	Kevin Keatts	UNC Wilmington	7	113–79	55–58	0	2	0	0
North Carolina	Hubert Davis	North Carolina (Assistant)	3	49–23	26–14	0	1	1	0
Notre Dame	Micah Shrewsberry	Penn State	1	0–0	0–0	0	0	0	0
Pittsburgh	Jeff Capel	Duke (Assistant)	6	75–81	35–59	0	1	0	0
Syracuse	Adrian Autry	Syracuse (Associate Head Coach)	1	0–0	0–0	0	0	0	0
Virginia	Tony Bennett	Washington State	15	341–124	176–75	2	9	1	1
Virginia Tech	Mike Young	Wofford	5	73–51	35–38	1	2	0	0
Wake Forest	Steve Forbes	East Tennessee State	4	50–39	26–32	0	0	0	0

Notes:

- Year at school includes 2023–24 season.
- Overall and ACC records are from the time at current school and are through the end of the 2022–23 season.
- NCAA tournament appearances are from the time at current school only.
- NCAA Final Fours and championship include time at other schools

== Preseason ==
=== Recruiting classes ===
Rankings
Team	247 Sports	On3Recruits	Rivals	Commits
Boston College	51	70	NR	3
Clemson	95	102	NR	1
Duke	2	2	1	4
Florida State	69	34	35	1
Georgia Tech	75	66	71	4
Louisville	6	9	8	6
Miami	46	49	47	3
NC State	74	46	49	1
North Carolina	32	10	41	2
Notre Dame	26	40	55	4
Pittsburgh	22	26	15	4
Syracuse	NR	146	NR	1
Virginia	20	27	27	4
Virginia Tech	57	68	46	2
Wake Forest	44	35	33	3

Notes:

- Rankings are up to date as of October 16, 2023.
- NR stands for not ranked.

=== Preseason watchlists ===
	Wooden Award	Naismith	Cousy	West	Erving	Malone	Abdul-Jabbar
Armando Bacot	✓	✓					✓
Reece Beekman	✓	✓					
Matthew Cleveland					✓		
R. J. Davis	✓	✓	✓				
Kyle Filipowski	✓					✓	
PJ Hall		✓					
Harrison Ingram					✓		
Judah Mintz	✓	✓	✓				
Mark Mitchell					✓		
Norchad Omier	✓	✓				✓	
Nijel Pack	✓	✓	✓				
Tyrese Proctor	✓	✓	✓				
Jeremy Roach	✓			✓			

=== Preseason All-American teams ===
Player	AP
Armando Bacot	1st
Kyle Filipowski	1st

=== Preseason polls ===
	247 Sports	AP	Blue Ribbon Yearbook	CBS Sports	Coaches	ESPN	Fox Sports	KenPom	NCAA Sports	Sports Illustrated
Boston College	-	-	-	-	-	-	-	128	-	-
Clemson	-	-	-	-	-	-	-	51	-	-
Duke	2	2	7	3	3	2	2	9	2	1
Florida State	-	-	-	-	-	-	-	88	-	-
Georgia Tech	-	-	-	-	-	-	-	118	-	-
Louisville	-	-	-	-	-	-	-	109	-	-
Miami	13	13	22	10	13	19	10	45	7	16
North Carolina	22	19	16	22	21	14	22	17	17	14
NC State	-	-	-	-	-	-	-	61	-	-
Notre Dame	-	-	-	-	-	-	-	165	-	-
Pittsburgh	-	-	-	-	-	-	-	62	35	-
Syracuse	-	-	-	-	-	-	-	105	-	-
Virginia	-	RV	-	-	RV	-	-	33	-	-
Virginia Tech	-	-	-	-	-	-	-	65	-	-
Wake Forest	-	-	-	-	-	-	-	73	-	-

==== ACC Preseason Media poll ====
The preseason poll and Preseason All-ACC Teams were released on October 26, 2023, prior to the season beginning and after ACC Media Day. The results of the poll are below.

===== Preseason poll =====
1. Duke – 757 (44)
2. Miami – 693 (5)
3. North Carolina – 670 (1)
4. Virginia – 593 (1)
5. Clemson – 570
6. Wake Forest – 440
7. NC State – 420
8. Virginia Tech – 390
9. Pittsburgh – 380
10. Syracuse – 321
11. Florida State – 294
12. Boston College – 227
13. Georgia Tech – 157
14. Louisville – 108
15. Notre Dame – 100

First-place votes shown in parentheses.

===== Preseason All-ACC teams =====
2023 ACC Men's Basketball Preseason All-ACC Teams
First Team	Second Team
Kyle Filipowski – Duke; Armando Bacot – North Carolina; PJ Hall – Clemson; Reece Beekman – Virginia; Norchad Omier – Miami	Judah Mintz – Syracuse; Nijel Pack – Miami; Blake Hinson – Pittsburgh; Tyrese Proctor – Duke; Quinten Post – Boston College

===== ACC preseason player of the year =====
- Kyle Filipowski – Duke (35)
- Armando Bacot – North Carolina (13)
- PJ Hall – Clemson (2)
- Tyrese Proctor – Duke (1)

===== ACC Preseason Freshman of the year =====
- Elliot Cadeau – North Carolina (40)
- Jared McCain – Duke (6)
- Caleb Foster – Duke (3)
- Donald Hand Jr. – Boston College (1)
- Bub Carrington – Pittsburgh (1)

=== Early season tournaments ===
Team	Tournament	Finish
Boston College	Hall of Fame Classic	4th
Clemson	Asheville Championship	1st
Duke	Champions Classic	1st
Florida State	Sunshine Slam	1st
Georgia Tech	Diamond Head Classic	2nd
Louisville	Empire Classic	4th
Miami	Bahamas Championship	1st
North Carolina	Battle 4 Atlantis	3rd
NC State	Vegas Showdown	2nd
Notre Dame	Legends Classic	2nd
Pittsburgh	NIT Season Tip-Off	3rd
Syracuse	Maui Invitational	7th
Virginia	Fort Myers Tip-Off	3rd
Virginia Tech	ESPN Events Invitational	2nd
Wake Forest	Charleston Classic	6th

== Regular season ==
=== Rankings ===
Legend
	Increase in ranking
	Decrease in ranking
	Not ranked previous week
	First Place votes shown in ()
т	Tied

		Pre	Wk 2	Wk 3	Wk 4	Wk 5	Wk 6	Wk 7	Wk 8	Wk 9	Wk 10	Wk 11	Wk 12	Wk 13	Wk 14	Wk 15	Wk 16	Wk 17	Wk 18	Wk 19	Wk 20	Final
Boston College	AP																					
Boston College	C																					
Clemson	AP		RV	RV	RV	24	13	18	18	16	21	RV				RV	RV	RV			RV	14
Clemson	C		RV	RV	RV	20	11	18	17	16	22	RV	RV			RV	RV	RV	RV			15
Duke	AP	2 (11)	9	9	7	22	21	21	16	14	11т	7	12	7	9	9	8	10	9	11	13	9
Duke	C	3 (3)	9	9	7	21	19	19	15	13	11	6	12	7	10	8	7	10	8	11	14	9
Florida State	AP				RV																	
Florida State	C					RV						RV										
Georgia Tech	AP					RV																
Georgia Tech	C																					
Louisville	AP																					
Louisville	C																					
Miami	AP	13	12	10	8	15	24	RV	RV	RV	RV											
Miami	C	13	11	11	8	15	24	RV	RV	RV	RV											
North Carolina	AP	19	20	14	17	9	9	11	9	8	7	4 (1)	3	3	3	7	10	9	7	4	5	7
North Carolina	C	21	18	14	16	10	9	13	11	9	7	3	3	3	3	5	9	8	7	4	5	6
NC State	AP										RV	RV	RV								RV	10
NC State	C		RV	RV								RV									RV	13
Notre Dame	AP																					
Notre Dame	C																					
Pittsburgh	AP																RV					
Pittsburgh	C																				RV	
Syracuse	AP																					
Syracuse	C																					
Virginia	AP	RV	RV	24	RV	RV	22	22	RV					RV	RV	21	RV					
Virginia	C	RV	25т	18	RV	23	21	20	RV					RV	RV	23	RV	RV				
Virginia Tech	AP																					
Virginia Tech	C																					
Wake Forest	AP										RV							RV		RV		
Wake Forest	C										RV					RV		RV	RV			

=== Conference matrix ===
This table summarizes the head-to-head results between teams in conference play. Each team will play 20 conference games, and at least 1 against each opponent.

	Boston College	Clemson	Duke	Florida State	Georgia Tech	Louisville	Miami	North Carolina	NC State	Notre Dame	Pittsburgh	Syracuse	Virginia	Virginia Tech	Wake Forest
vs. Boston College	–	89–78	80–65	63–62; 84–76	87–95	77–89; 61–67	77–85; 57–67	76–66	84–78^{OT} 81–70	59–63; 58–61	90–65	69–59; 75–80	72–68	76–71	84–78
vs. Clemson	78–89	–	72–71	67–78; 63–74	93–90^{2OT} 57–81	64–70	95–82; 60–77	65–55; 76–80	78–77	69–62	70–79; 62–69	68–77; 75–90	66–65	87–72	81–76
vs. Duke	65–80	71–72	–	67–76	72–68; 79–84	69–83; 59–84	55–84	93–84; 84–79	64–79	59–67; 53–71	53–75; 80–76	66–86	48–73	67–77	69–77; 83–79
vs. Florida State	62–63; 76–84	78–67; 74–63	76–67	–	71–82; 85–76	101–92	75–84; 75–83	78–70; 75–68	83–90	58–67	88–73	69–85	80–76	74–77; 83–75	82–87
vs. Georgia Tech	95–87	90–93^{2OT} 81–57	68–72; 84–79	82–71; 76–85	–	79–67	76–80	73–74	82–76	75–68^{OT} 58–55	72–64	60–65	75–66; 72–57	91–67	80–51; 69–70
vs. Louisville	89–77; 67–61	70–64	83–69; 84–59	92–101	67–79	–	71–80	86–70	89–83	72–50	83–70; 86–59	94–92; 82–76	77–53; 69–52	75–68; 80–64	90–65
vs. Miami	85–77; 67–57	82–95; 77–60	84–55	84–75; 83–75	80–76	80–71	–	75–72; 75–71	74–68	49–62; 61–73	68–72	72–69	60–38	71–75; 74–82	86–82^{OT}
vs. North Carolina	66–76	55–65; 80–76	84–93; 79–84	70–78; 68–75	74–73	70–86	72–75; 71–75	–	54–67; 70–79	51–84	57–70	67–103; 86–79	44–54	81–96	64–85
vs. NC State	78–84^{OT} 70–81	77–78	79–64	90–83	76–82	83–89	68–74	67–54; 79–70	–	52–54	67–64; 81–73	77–65; 87–83	60–76; 59–53^{OT}	84–78	76–83; 83–79
vs. Notre Dame	63–59; 61–58	62–69	67–59; 71–53	67–58	68–75^{OT} 55–58	50–72	62–49; 73–61	84–51	54–52	–	70–60	88–85	54–76; 65–53	66–74; 82–76	65–70
vs. Pittsburgh	65–90	79–70; 69–62	75–53; 76–80	73–88	64–72	70–83; 59–86	72–68	70–57	64–67; 73–81	60–70	–	81–73; 69–58	63–74	64–79	72–77; 91–58
vs. Syracuse	59–69; 80–75	77–68; 90–75	86–66	85–69	65–60	92–94; 76–82	69–72	103–67; 79–86	65–77; 83–87	85–88	73–81; 58–69	–	84–62	71–84	99–70
vs. Virginia	68–72	65–66	73–48	76–80	66–75; 57–72	53–77; 52–69	38–60	54–44	76–60; 53–59^{OT}	76–54; 53–65	74–63	62–84	–	57–65; 75–41	66–47; 47–49
vs. Virginia Tech	71–76	72–87	77–67	77–74; 75–83	67–91	68–75; 64–80	75–71; 82–74	96–81	78–84	74–66; 76–82	79–64	84–71	65–57; 41–75	–	86–63; 76–87
vs. Wake Forest	78–84	76–81	77–69; 79–83	87–82	51–80; 70–69	65–90	82–86^{OT}	85–64	83–76; 79–83	70–65	77–72; 58–91	70–99	47–66; 49–47	63–86; 87–76	–
Total	8–12	11–9	15–5	10–10	7–13	3–17	6–14	17–3	9–11	7–13	12–8	11–9	13–7	10–10	11–9

=== Player of the week ===
Throughout the conference regular season, the Atlantic Coast Conference offices named one or two Players of the week and one or two Rookies of the week.

Week	Player of the week	Rookie of the week	Reference
Week 1 – November 13	Armando Bacot – North Carolina	Bub Carrington – Pittsburgh	
Week 2 – November 20	Quinten Post – Boston College	Bub Carrington (2) – Pittsburgh	
Week 3 – November 27	Jamir Watkins – Florida State	Dennis Parker Jr. – NC State	
Week 3 – November 27	R. J. Davis – North Carolina	Dennis Parker Jr. – NC State	
Week 4 – December 4	PJ Hall – Clemson	Baye Ndongo – Georgia Tech	
Week 5 – December 11	Blake Hinson – Pittsburgh	Bub Carrington (3) – Pittsburgh	
Week 6 – December 18	Kyle Filipowski – Duke	Baye Ndongo (2) – Georgia Tech	
Week 7 – December 26	Lynn Kidd – Virginia Tech	Baye Ndongo (3) – Georgia Tech	
Week 7 – December 26	R. J. Davis (2) – North Carolina	Baye Ndongo (3) – Georgia Tech	
Week 8 – January 2	Quadir Copeland – Syracuse	Markus Burton – Notre Dame	
Week 9 – January 8	Armando Bacot (2) – North Carolina	Bub Carrington (4) – Pittsburgh	
Week 9 – January 8	Kevin Miller – Wake Forest	Bub Carrington (4) – Pittsburgh	
Week 10 – January 15	Sean Pedulla – Virginia Tech	Braeden Shrewsberry – Notre Dame	
Week 11 – January 22	Reece Beekman – Virginia	Jaland Lowe – Pittsburgh	
Week 12 – January 29	R. J. Davis (3) – North Carolina	Jared McCain – Duke	
Week 13 – February 5	Harrison Ingram – North Carolina	Ty-Laur Johnson – Louisville	
Week 13 – February 5	DJ Horne – NC State	Ty-Laur Johnson – Louisville	
Week 14 – February 12	Joseph Girard III – Clemson	Markus Burton (2) – Notre Dame	
Week 15 – February 19	Blake Hinson (2) – Pittsburgh	Jared McCain (2) – Duke	
Week 16 – February 26	Hunter Sallis – Wake Forest	Markus Burton (3) – Notre Dame	
Week 17 – March 4	R. J. Davis (4) – North Carolina	Markus Burton (4) – Notre Dame	
Week 18 – March 11	Cormac Ryan – North Carolina	Bub Carrington (5) – Pittsburgh	

=== Records against other conferences ===
2023–24 records against non-conference foes. Records shown for regular season only. Statistics through games played on December 30, 2023.

Power 6 Conferences & Gonzaga	Record
American	2–5
Big East	2–5
Big Ten	3–2
Big 12	9–3
Pac-12	6–3
SEC	12–18
Gonzaga	0–1
Power 7 Total	31–37
Other NCAA Division I Conferences	Record
America East	6–1
A-10	6–1
ASUN	8–1
Big Sky	0–0
Big South	8–0
Big West	2–0
CAA	7–0
C-USA	2–0
Horizon League	2–0
Ivy League	3–0
MAAC	6–0
MAC	2–0
MEAC	9–0
MVC	2–0
Mountain West	3–2
NEC	3–0
OVC	2–0
Patriot League	5–0
Pacific West	0–0
SoCon	3–3
Southland	0–0
SWAC	3–0
The Summit	0–0
Sun Belt	1–1
WAC	2–0
WCC (not including Gonzaga)	1–0
Other Division I Total	87–9
NCAA Division I Total	119–46
NCAA Division II Total	1–0

== Postseason ==
=== ACC tournament ===
- The 2023 Atlantic Coast Conference Basketball Tournament was held at the Capital One Arena in Washington, D.C., from March 12 to 16, 2024.

First round Tuesday, March 12
12	Notre Dame	84
13	Georgia Tech	80
10	NC State	94
15	Louisville	85
11	Boston College	81
14	Miami	65

Second round Wednesday, March 13
8	Virginia Tech	76
9	Florida State	86
5	Wake Forest	72
12	Notre Dame	59
7	Syracuse	65
10	NC State	83
6	Clemson	55
11	Boston College	76

Quarterfinals; Thursday, March 14
1	North Carolina	92
9	Florida State	67
4	Pittsburgh	81
5	Wake Forest	69
2	Duke	69
10	NC State	74
3	Virginia	66^{OT}
11	Boston College	60

Semifinals; Friday, March 15
1	North Carolina	72
4	Pittsburgh	65
10	NC State	73^{OT}
3	Virginia	65

Championship; Saturday, March 16
1	North Carolina	76
10	NC State	84

=== NCAA tournament ===
Seed	Region	School	First Four	1st round	2nd round	Sweet 16	Elite Eight	Final Four	Championship
1	West	North Carolina	Bye	W 90–62 vs. #16 Wagner – (Charlotte)	W 85–69 vs. #9 Michigan State – (Charlotte)	L 87–89 vs. #4 Alabama – (Los Angeles)			
4	South	Duke	Bye	W 64–47 vs. #14 Vermont – (Brooklyn)	W 93–55 vs. #12 James Madison – (Brooklyn)	W 54–51 vs. #1 Houston – (Dallas)	L 64–78 vs. #11 NC State – (Dallas)		
6	West	Clemson	Bye	W 77–56 vs. #11 New Mexico – (Memphis)	W 72–64 vs. #3 Baylor – (Memphis)	W 77–72 vs. #2 Arizona – (Los Angeles)	L 82–89 vs. #4 Alabama – (Los Angeles)		
10	Midwest	Virginia	L 42–67 vs. #10 Colorado State – (Dayton)						
11	South	NC State	Bye	W 80–67 vs. #6 Texas Tech – (Pittsburgh)	W 79–73^{OT} vs. #14 Oakland – (Pittsburgh)	W 67–58 vs. #2 Marquette – (Dallas)	W 76–64 vs. #4 Duke – (Dallas)	L 50–63 vs. #1 Purdue – (Phoenix)	
		W–L (%):	0–1 (.000)	4–0 (1.000)	4–0 (1.000)	3–1 (.750)	1–2 (.333)	0–1 (.000)	0–0 (–) Total: 12–5 (.706)

=== National Invitation tournament ===
Seed	Bracket	School	1st round	2nd round	Quarterfinals	Semifinals	Championship
1	Wake Forest	Wake Forest	W 87–76 vs. Appalachian State – (Winston-Salem)	L 66–72 vs. #4 Georgia – (Winston-Salem)			
3	Wake Forest	Virginia Tech	W 74–58 vs. Richmond – (Blacksburg)	L 73–81 @ #2 Ohio State – (Columbus)			
—	Seton Hall	Boston College	W 62–57 @ #3 Providence – (Providence)	L 70–79 @ UNLV – (Las Vegas)			
		W–L (%):	3–0 (1.000)	0–3 (.000)	0–0 (–)	0–0 (–)	0–0 (–) Total: 3–3 (.500)

== Honors and awards ==
=== All-Americans ===
Consensus All-Americans
First Team	Second Team
None	None

To earn "consensus" status, a player must win honors based on a point system computed from the four different all-America teams. The point system consists of three points for first team, two points for second team and one point for third team. No honorable mention or fourth team or lower are used in the computation. The top five totals plus ties are first team and the next five plus ties are second team.

Associated Press	NABC	Sporting News	USBWA
First Team
R. J. Davis	R. J. Davis	R. J. Davis	R. J. Davis
Second Team
Kyle Filipowski	Kyle Filipowski	None	Kyle Filipowski
Third Team
None	None	Kyle Filipowski	Armando Bacot

=== ACC Awards ===
2023-24 ACC Men's Basketball Individual Awards
Award	Recipient(s)
Player of the Year	R. J. Davis – North Carolina
Coach of the Year	Hubert Davis – North Carolina
Defensive Player of the Year	Reece Beekman – Virginia
Rookie of the Year	Markus Burton – Notre Dame
Most Improved Player of the Year	Ian Schieffelin – Clemson
Sixth Man Award	Ishmael Leggett – Pittsburgh

2023-24 ACC Men's Basketball All-Conference Teams
First Team	Second Team	Third Team	Honorable Mention
R. J. Davis – North Carolina; PJ Hall – Clemson; Kyle Filipowski – Duke; Hunter Sallis – Wake Forest; Blake Hinson – Pittsburgh	Armando Bacot – North Carolina; Reece Beekman – Virginia; Judah Mintz – Syracuse; Norchad Omier – Miami; Quinten Post – Boston College	DJ Horne – NC State; Harrison Ingram – North Carolina; Jeremy Roach – Duke; Markus Burton – Notre Dame; Sean Pedulla – Virginia Tech	Joseph Girard III – Clemson; Jamir Watkins – Florida State; Jared McCain – Duke; Ian Schieffelin – Clemson; Miles Kelly – Georgia Tech; Bub Carrington – Pittsburgh; Brandon Huntley-Hatfield – Louisville; Ryan Dunn – Virginia

2023-24 ACC Men's Basketball All-Freshman Team
Player	Team
Markus Burton	Notre Dame
Jared McCain	Duke
Bub Carrington	Pittsburgh
Baye Ndongo	Georgia Tech
Elliot Cadeau	North Carolina

2023-24 ACC Men's Basketball All-Defensive Team
Player	Team
Reece Beekman	Virginia
Ryan Dunn	Virginia
Maliq Brown	Syracuse
Armando Bacot	North Carolina
Quinten Post	Boston College

== NBA draft ==
PG	Point guard	SG	Shooting guard	SF	Small forward	PF	Power forward	C	Center

Player	Team	Round	Pick #	Position	School
Bub Carrington	Portland Trail Blazers	1	14	SG	Pittsburgh
Jared McCain	Philadelphia 76ers	1	16	PG	Duke
Kyshawn George	New York Knicks	1	24	SG	Miami (FL)
Ryan Dunn	Denver Nuggets	1	28	SF	Virginia
Kyle Filipowski	Utah Jazz	2	31	PF/C	Duke
Harrison Ingram	San Antonio Spurs	2	48	SF/PF	North Carolina
Quinten Post	Golden State Warriors	2	52	C	Boston College

== Attendance ==
Team	Arena	Capacity	Game 1	Game 2	Game 3	Game 4	Game 5	Game 6	Game 7	Game 8	Game 9	Total	Average	% of Capacity
Team	Arena	Capacity	Game 10	Game 11	Game 12	Game 13	Game 14	Game 15	Game 16	Game 17	Game 18	Total	Average	% of Capacity
Boston College	Conte Forum	8,606	4,736	3,886	6,326	5,249	3,118	4,866	5,042	4,265	5,052	92,947	5,467	63.53%
Boston College	Conte Forum	8,606	6,348	8,606	6,611	4,390	3,459	8,606	4,851	7,536		92,947	5,467	63.53%
Clemson	Littlejohn Coliseum	9,000	6,361	5,748	5,791	9,000	6,871	7,276	9,000	8,708	7,217	123,289	7,706	85.62%
Clemson	Littlejohn Coliseum	9,000	6,760	9,000	7,211	9,000	9,000	7,346	9,000			123,289	7,706	85.62%
Duke	Cameron Indoor Stadium	9,314	9,314	9,314	9,314	9,314	9,314	9,314	9,314	9,314	9,314	167,652	9,314	100%
Duke	Cameron Indoor Stadium	9,314	9,314	9,314	9,314	9,314	9,314	9,314	9,314	9,314	9,314	167,652	9,314	100%
Florida State	Donald L. Tucker Center	11,675	6,165	4,953	6,688	4,301	4,056	4,499	4,051	4,248	5,025	106,260	6,251	53.54%
Florida State	Donald L. Tucker Center	11,675	5,368	10,033	10,092	8,525	11,500	6,009	4,727	6,020		106,260	6,251	53.54%
Georgia Tech	McCamish Pavilion	8,600	3,414	3,802	3,778	3,913	7,758	3,919	5,052	3,729	6,380	74,912	4,994	58.07%
Georgia Tech	McCamish Pavilion	8,600	3,612	8,600	4,239	6,241	4,567	5,908				74,912	4,994	58.07%
Louisville	KFC Yum! Center	22,090	11,010	10,634	10,501	10,527	11,538	10,401	10,475	17,293	10,883	207,067	11,504	52.08%
Louisville	KFC Yum! Center	22,090	12,114	12,620	11,381	11,287	11,891	11,342	11,011	10,544	11,615	207,067	11,504	52.08%
Miami	Watsco Center	7,972	6,861	7,972	6,620	7,972	5,818	6,407	5,616	6,504	6,800	121,706	7,159	89.80%
Miami	Watsco Center	7,972	6,929	7,972	7,779	7,234	7,972	7,972	7,906	7,372		121,706	7,159	89.80%
North Carolina	Dean Smith Center	21,750	17,331	18,608	18,226	20,756	20,285	21,750	21,750	20,298	21,175	308,895	20,593	94.68%
North Carolina	Dean Smith Center	21,750	21,750	20,689	21,750	21,027	21,750	21,750				308,895	20,593	94.68%
NC State	PNC Arena; Reynolds Coliseum	19,722 (PNC); 5,500 (Reynolds)	12,488	12,554	12,331	5,500 (Note: Game played at Reynolds Coliseum. Remaining home games played at PNC Arena.)	11,326	12,555	12,594	14,821	19,500	229,346	13,491	68.41%
NC State	PNC Arena; Reynolds Coliseum	19,722 (PNC); 5,500 (Reynolds)	13,836	15,850	12,194	15,523	11,366	12,766	14,642	19,500		229,346	13,491	68.41%
Notre Dame	Edmund P. Joyce Center	9,149	7,338	5,742	5,179	4,883	7,140	4,377	5,440	7,784	4,727	103,638	6,096	66.63%
Notre Dame	Edmund P. Joyce Center	9,149	8,066	6,427	5,948	6,593	7,394	4,589	4,698	7,313		103,638	6,096	66.63%
Pittsburgh	Petersen Events Center	12,508	6,797	7,747	6,567	7,842	7,390	7,713	7,808	8,370	7,641	157,535	8,752	69.97%
Pittsburgh	Petersen Events Center	12,508	9,770	11,476	7,708	7,769	10,864	11,419	12,094	7,860	10,700	157,535	8,752	69.97%
Syracuse	Carrier Dome	33,000	19,130	19,080	19,387	19,602	19,390	18,239	20,642	17,311	20,960	324,603	20,288	61.48%
Syracuse	Carrier Dome	33,000	19,859	21,814	19,426	23,050	21,275	25,194	20,244			324,603	20,288	61.48%
Virginia	John Paul Jones Arena	14,623	14,080	12,905	13,099	14,061	14,637	13,459	13,676	14,637	13,703	237,872	13,992	95.69%
Virginia	John Paul Jones Arena	14,623	14,547	13,947	13,947	14,165	13,858	14,637	14,637	13,877		237,872	13,992	95.69%
Virginia Tech	Cassell Coliseum	8,925	8,925	5,899	4,582	8,925	6,107	4,918	4,886	8,925	8,925	124,567	7,785	87.23%
Virginia Tech	Cassell Coliseum	8,925	8,925	8,925	8,925	8,925	8,925	8,925	8,925			124,567	7,785	87.23%
Wake Forest	LJVM Coliseum	14,665	6,641	6,702	8,165	7,692	7,224	6,423	6,775	10,055	8,706	153,443	9,026	61.55%
Wake Forest	LJVM Coliseum	14,665	9,855	9,261	11,412	12,571	7,448	14,744	7,481	12,288		153,443	9,026	61.55%
