= Federiko Federiko =

Finnish basketball player (born 2001)

No. 33 – Anorthosis Famagusta
- Position: Center
- League: Cyprus Basketball Division A

Personal information
- Born: 9 May 2001 (age 25) Cairo, Egypt
- Listed height: 2.11 m (6 ft 11 in)
- Listed weight: 100 kg (220 lb)

Career information
- High school: First Love Christian Academy (Washington, Pennsylvania)
- College: Northern Oklahoma (2021–2022); Pittsburgh (2022–2024); Texas Tech (2024–2025); Texas A&M (2025–2026)
- NBA draft: 2026: undrafted
- Playing career: 2018–present

Career history
- 2018–2019: Hyvinkään Ponteva
- 2019–2020: Torpan Pojat
- 2026–present: Anorthosis Famagusta

Federiko Federiko (born 9 May 2001) is a Finnish professional basketball player for Anorthosis Famagusta of the Cyprus Basketball Division A. He played college basketball player for the Northern Oklahoma Mavericks, Pittsburgh Panthers, Texas Tech Red Raiders, and Texas A&M Aggies.

== Early career ==
Federiko played in the youth teams of Rekolan Urheilijat and Pussihukat in Vantaa. He also played for Go Time Athletics and Omnia Basketball Academy, before making his senior debut in Finnish third-tier with Hyvinkään Ponteva in 2018. In the next 2019–2020 season he played for Torpan Pojat (ToPo) in Finnish second-tier Koripallon I-divisioona, before moving to United States and first joining First Love Christian Academy. For the 2021–22 season, he joined Northern Oklahoma College and played in the NJCAA junior college league, averaging 11.7 points, 8.6 rebounds and 1.9 blocks per game.

== College career ==
After Federiko had already committed to West Virginia, in the late April 2022 it was announced that he would join Pittsburgh for the upcoming 2022–23 season. In his first season in NCAA Division I, Federiko averaged 6.6. points, 5.3 rebounds and 1.7 blocks per game. After two seasons with Pittsburgh, Federiko entered the NCAA transfer portal on 21 March 2024. On 17 April 2024, he committed to Texas Tech for his last year of eligibility; but would later play for Texas A&M Aggies the next season.

== International career ==
A former youth international at various age levels, Federiko has played six matches in the Finland national basketball team.

== Personal life ==
Federiko was born in Cairo, Egypt, to South Sudanese refugee parents. Later at his early age, the family moved to Finland and settled in Helsinki. Before beginning to play basketball, his first sport was football. His brother Okku Federiko is also a college basketball player. Federiko and his family are close friends with Awak Kuier and her family, who share similar background.

== Career statistics ==
Legend
GP	Games played	GS	Games started	MPG	Minutes per game
FG%	Field goal percentage	3P%	3-point field goal percentage	FT%	Free throw percentage
RPG	Rebounds per game	APG	Assists per game	SPG	Steals per game
BPG	Blocks per game	PPG	Points per game	**Bold**	Career high

=== College ===
Year	Team	GP	GS	MPG	FG%	3P%	FT%	RPG	APG	SPG	BPG	PPG
2022–23	Pittsburgh	**35**	**27**	**23.4**	.667	–	**.647**	**5.3**	.5	.4	**1.7**	**6.6**
2023–24	Pittsburgh	33	26	21.3	.637	–	.413	5.2	**1.0**	**.5**	1.3	4.7
2024–25	Texas Tech	**35**	6	18.9	**.743**	–	.492	4.5	.7	.4	.8	5.1
2025–26	Texas A&M	31	4	8.6	.600	–	.469	1.9	.5	.4	.4	1.8
Career		134	63	18.3	.673	–	.513	4.3	.7	.4	1.1	4.7
