= 2023–24 Virginia Cavaliers men's basketball team =

American men's college basketball season

2023–24 Virginia Cavaliers men's basketball

NCAA tournament, First Four
- Conference: Atlantic Coast Conference
- Record: 23–11 (13–7 ACC)
- Head coach: Tony Bennett (15th season)
- Associate head coach: Jason Williford (15th season)
- Assistant coaches: Ron Sanchez (10th season); Orlando Vandross (6th season)
- Offensive scheme: Blocker-Mover
- Base defense: Pack-Line
- Home arena: John Paul Jones Arena

2023–24 ACC men's basketball standings
	Conf.				Overall
Team	W		L	PCT	W		L	PCT
No. 7 North Carolina	17	–	3	.850	29	–	8	.784
No. 9 Duke	15	–	5	.750	27	–	9	.750
Virginia	13	–	7	.650	23	–	11	.676
Pittsburgh	12	–	8	.600	22	–	11	.667
Wake Forest	11	–	9	.550	21	–	14	.600
No. 14 Clemson	11	–	9	.550	24	–	12	.667
Syracuse	11	–	9	.550	20	–	12	.625
Virginia Tech	10	–	10	.500	19	–	15	.559
Florida State	10	–	10	.500	17	–	16	.515
No. 10 NC State †	9	–	11	.450	26	–	15	.634
Boston College	8	–	12	.400	20	–	16	.556
Notre Dame	7	–	13	.350	13	–	20	.394
Georgia Tech	7	–	13	.350	14	–	18	.438
Miami (FL)	6	–	14	.300	15	–	17	.469
Louisville	3	–	17	.150	8	–	24	.250
† 2024 ACC tournament winner Rankings from AP Poll

The 2023–24 Virginia Cavaliers men's basketball team represented the University of Virginia during the 2023–24 NCAA Division I men's basketball season. The team was led by head coach Tony Bennett in his 15th year, and played their home games at John Paul Jones Arena in Charlottesville, Virginia, as members of the Atlantic Coast Conference. The Virginia Cavaliers men's basketball team drew an average home attendance of 13,992 in 17 games in 2023-24, the 17th highest in college basketball.

The Cavaliers started the season with four straight wins and earned themselves the twenty-fourth spot in the AP rankings to start the season. They lost the opening game of the Fort Myers Tip-Off to Wisconsin and rebounded to defeat West Virginia in the third place game. The win was not enough to keep them in the rankings, as they fell out ahead of their ACC–SEC Challenge matchup with fourteenth ranked Texas A&M. They won that match and two more matches to return to the rankings at number twenty-two. They went 1–1 as the 22nd ranked team, losing to twenty-third ranked Memphis before falling out again. The Cavaliers lost three of their next four ACC games, with the lone win coming against struggling Louisville. A rivalry win over Virginia Tech sparked an eight game winning streak for the Cavaliers as they also defeated NC State in overtime and Clemson during the stretch. They returned to the rankings at number twenty-one. They lost to Pittsburgh and won a low scoring game against Wake Forest before falling out of the rankings again. The Cavaliers finished out the season 2–3 losing a rivalry rematch to Virginia Tech and to North Carolina and Duke, who were both ranked tenth at the time of the matchup.

The Cavaliers finished the season 23–11 and 13–7 in ACC play to finish in third place. As the third seed in the ACC tournament, they earned a bye to the quarterfinals, where they defeated eleventh seed Boston College in overtime before losing to eventual champions NC State in overtime in the Semifinals. They earned a controversial at-large bid to the NCAA tournament, and were placed as a tenth seed in the First Four in the Midwest region. They lost their matchup with Colorado State 67–42 to end their season. After the game, Virginia was widely criticized for its offensive performance, which included a stretch of nearly 14 minutes of game time and nearly an hour of real time during which they did not score.

== Previous season ==
The 2022–23 Cavaliers finished the season with a 25–8 record, 15–5 in ACC play, to finish in a tie for first place and clinch a share of their sixth regular season title in ten seasons, and their eleventh ACC regular season title in school history. They defeated North Carolina and Clemson to reach the championship game of the ACC tournament, where they lost to Duke. They received a bid to NCAA tournament as the No. 4 seed in the East region, where they were upset in the First Round by Furman.

== Offseason ==
=== Coaching changes ===
Virginia coaching changes
Name	Previous position	New position
Kyle Getter	Assistant coach	Associate head coach (Notre Dame)
Ron Sanchez	Head coach (Charlotte)	Associate head coach
Chase Coleman	Guard (w)	Graduate assistant

=== Departures ===
Virginia departures
Name	Number	Pos.	Height	Weight	Year	Hometown	Reason for departure
Kihei Clark	0	G	5'10"	167	Graduate student	Woodland Hills, CA	Graduated
Jayden Gardner	1	F	6'6"	233	Graduate student	Wake Forest, NC	Graduated
Armaan Franklin	4	G	6'4"	200	Senior	Indianapolis, IN	Graduated/undrafted in 2023 NBA draft; signed with the Denver Nuggets
Ben Vander Plas	5	F	6'8"	236	(redshirt) Graduate student	Ripon, WI	Graduated
Chase Coleman	12	G	5'9"	165	Senior	Norfolk, VA	Walk-on; became UVA graduate assistant coach
Kadin Shedrick	21	F/C	6'11"	231	(redshirt) Junior	Holly Springs, NC	Transferred to Texas
Francisco Cáffaro	22	C	7'1"	254	(redshirt) Senior	Santa Fe, Argentina	Graduate transferred to Santa Clara
Isaac Traudt	23	F	6'9"	229	Freshman	Grand Island, NE	Transferred to Creighton

=== Incoming transfers ===
Virginia incoming transfers
Name	Number	Pos.	Height	Weight	Year	Hometown	Previous school	Years remaining	Date eligible
Andrew Rohde	4	G	6'6"	202	Sophomore	Milwaukee, WI	St. Thomas (MN)	3	October 1, 2023
Jordan Minor	22	F	6'8"	242	Graduate student	Kingston, MA	Merrimack	1	October 1, 2023
Jake Groves	34	F	6'9"	211	Graduate student	Spokane, WA	Oklahoma	1	October 1, 2023

=== 2023 recruiting class ===
College recruiting
Name	Hometown	School	Height	Weight	Commit date
Blake Buchanan #12 PF	Coeur d'Alene, ID	Lake City	6 ft 11 in (2.11 m)	225 lb (102 kg)	Jul 3, 2022
Blake Buchanan #12 PF	Recruit ratings: Rivals: 247Sports: ESPN: (84)				
Elijah Gertrude #6 CG	Jersey City, NJ	Hudson Catholic	6 ft 4 in (1.93 m)	185 lb (84 kg)	Sep 14, 2022
Elijah Gertrude #6 CG	Recruit ratings: Rivals: 247Sports: ESPN: (82)				
Anthony Robinson #52 C	Peachtree City, GA	Christ School	6 ft 10 in (2.08 m)	238 lb (108 kg)	Apr 29, 2023
Anthony Robinson #52 C	Recruit ratings: Rivals: 247Sports: ESPN: (NR)				
Christian Bliss; SG	Queens, NY	George School	6 ft 4 in (1.93 m)	198 lb (90 kg)	Jun 30, 2023
Christian Bliss; SG	Recruit ratings: Rivals: 247Sports: ESPN: (81)				
Overall recruit ranking: Rivals: 16 247Sports: 12 ESPN: –
Note: In many cases, Scout, Rivals, 247Sports, On3, and ESPN may conflict in their listings of height and weight.; In these cases, the average was taken. ESPN grades are on a 100-point scale.; Sources: "Virginia 2023 Basketball Commitments". Rivals.; "2023 Virginia Commits". Scout.; "2023 Player Commits". ESPN.; "Scout.com Team Recruiting Rankings". Scout.; "2023 Team Ranking". Rivals.; "Virginia 2023 Basketball Commitments". 247Sports.

=== 2024 recruiting class ===
College recruiting (2024)
Name	Hometown	School	Height	Weight	Commit date
Christian Bliss #48 SG	Newtown, PA	George School	6 ft 4 in (1.93 m)	185 lb (84 kg)	Jun 30, 2023
Christian Bliss #48 SG	Recruit ratings: Rivals: 247Sports: ESPN: (82)				
Overall recruit ranking: Rivals: 16 247Sports: 12 ESPN: –
Note: In many cases, Scout, Rivals, 247Sports, On3, and ESPN may conflict in their listings of height and weight.; In these cases, the average was taken. ESPN grades are on a 100-point scale.; Sources: "Virginia 2024 Basketball Commitments". Rivals.; "2024 Virginia Commits". Scout.; "2024 Player Commits". ESPN.; "Scout.com Team Recruiting Rankings". Scout.; "2024 Team Ranking". Rivals.; "Virginia 2024 Basketball Commitments". 247Sports.

== Roster ==
=== Players ===
2023–24 Virginia Cavaliers men's basketball team
Players
Coaches

Pos.	#	Name	Height	Weight	Year	Previous school	Hometown
F	0	Blake Buchanan	6 ft 11 in (2.11 m)	225 lb (102 kg)	Fr	Lake City	Coeur d'Alene, ID
G	1	Dante Harris	6 ft 0 in (1.83 m)	170 lb (77 kg)	RS Jr	Lakeway Christian Academy (TN); Georgetown	Washington, D.C.
G	2	Reece Beekman	6 ft 3 in (1.91 m)	194 lb (88 kg)	Sr	Scotlandville Magnet (LA)	Milwaukee, WI
G	4	Andrew Rohde	6 ft 6 in (1.98 m)	202 lb (92 kg)	So	Brookfield Central; St. Thomas (MN)	Milwaukee, WI
G	5	Desmond Roberts (W)	6 ft 4 in (1.93 m)	206 lb (93 kg)	Fr	St. Anne's-Belfield	Charlottesville, VA
G	10	Taine Murray	6 ft 5 in (1.96 m)	207 lb (94 kg)	Jr	Rosmini College	Auckland, New Zealand
G	11	Isaac McKneely	6 ft 4 in (1.93 m)	188 lb (85 kg)	So	Poca	Poca, WV
G	12	Elijah Gertrude	6 ft 4 in (1.93 m)	185 lb (84 kg)	Fr	Hudson Catholic Regional	Jersey City, NJ
G	13	Ryan Dunn	6 ft 8 in (2.03 m)	216 lb (98 kg)	So	Perkiomen School	Freeport, NY
F/C	21	Anthony Robinson	6 ft 10 in (2.08 m)	238 lb (108 kg)	Fr	Christ School (NC)	Peachtree City, GA
F	22	Jordan Minor	6 ft 8 in (2.03 m)	242 lb (110 kg)	GS	Brimmer and May; Merrimack	Kingston, MA
F	24	Tristan How (W)	6 ft 7 in (2.01 m)	210 lb (95 kg)	Sr	Norfolk Collegiate	Virginia Beach, VA
G	30	Christian Bliss	6 ft 4 in (1.93 m)	198 lb (90 kg)	Fr	George School (PA)	Queens, NY
F	34	Jake Groves	6 ft 9 in (2.06 m)	211 lb (96 kg)	GS	Shadle Park; Oklahoma	Spokane, WA
G/F	35	Leon Bond III	6 ft 5 in (1.96 m)	200 lb (91 kg)	RS Fr	Wauwatosa East	Wauwatosa, WI
G	42	Bryce Walker (W)	6 ft 2 in (1.88 m)	200 lb (91 kg)	Jr	New Hampton School	Beltsville, MD

Head coach

- Tony Bennett (Green Bay)

Assistant coach(es)

- Jason Williford (Virginia)
- Ron Sanchez (SUNY Oneonta)
- Orlando Vandross (American International)

Legend

- (C) Team captain
- (S) Suspended
- (I) Ineligible
- (W) Walk-on
- Injured
- Current redshirt

Roster

=== Coaches ===
Virginia coaching staff
Name	Position	Year with position	Year on coaching staff	Alma mater	Hometown
Tony Bennett	Dean and Markel Families head coach	15	15	UW-Green Bay	Clintonville, WI
Jason Williford	Associate head coach	6	15	Virginia	Richmond, VA
Ron Sanchez	Associate head coach	1	10	SUNY-Oneonta	San Pedro de Macorís, DR
Orlando Vandross	Assistant coach	6	9	American International	United States
Brad Soderberg	Director of scouting	3	9	UW-Stevens Point	Wausau, WI
Larry Mangino	Director of player development	3	8	Montclair State	United States
Johnny Carpenter	Director of player personnel	6	9	Virginia	Great Falls, VA
Isaiah Wilkins	Graduate assistant	3	3	Virginia	Lilburn, GA
Chase Coleman	Graduate assistant	1	1	Virginia	Norfolk, Virginia
Mike Curtis	Strength and conditioning coach	15	15	Virginia	Richmond, VA
Ethan Saliba	Head athletic trainer	26	41	Kansas	United States
Ronnie Wideman	Associate AD for basketball administration/operations	14	15	Washington State	Washougal, WA

== Schedule and results ==
Date time, TV	Rank^{#}	Opponent^{#}	Result	Record	High points	High rebounds	High assists	Site (attendance) city, state
Regular season
November 6, 2023*; 7:00 p.m., ACCNX/ESPN+		Tarleton State	W 80–50	1–0	16 – Beekman	9 – Bond III	7 – Beekman	John Paul Jones Arena (14,080); Charlottesville, VA
November 10, 2023*; 7:00 p.m., ACCN		vs. Florida; He Gets Us Hall of Fame Series	W 73–70	2–0	18 – Buchanan	8 – Dunn	5 – Beekman	Spectrum Center (6,783); Charlotte, NC
November 14, 2023*; 7:00 p.m., ACCNX/ESPN+		North Carolina A&T	W 80–51	3–0	13 – Dunn	11 – Dunn	7 – Beekman	John Paul Jones Arena (12,905); Charlottesville, VA
November 16, 2023*; 7:00 p.m., ACCN		Texas Southern	W 62–33	4–0	15 – Dunn	5 – Dunn	4 – Beekman	John Paul Jones Arena (13,099); Charlottesville, VA
November 20, 2023*; 6:00 p.m., FS1	No. 24	vs. Wisconsin; Fort Myers Tip-Off semifinals	L 41–65	4–1	17 – Beekman	6 – Dunn	7 – Beekman	Suncoast Credit Union Arena (3,500); Fort Myers, FL
November 22, 2023*; 6:00 p.m., FS1	No. 24	vs. West Virginia; Fort Myers Tip-Off consolation	W 56–54	5–1	13 – Dunn	7 – Bond III	5 – Beekman	Suncoast Credit Union Arena (3,500); Fort Myers, FL
November 29, 2023*; 7:15 p.m., ESPN2		No. 14 Texas A&M; ACC–SEC Challenge	W 59–47	6–1	13 – Rohde	6 – Rohde	5 – Beekman	John Paul Jones Arena (14,061); Charlottesville, VA
December 2, 2023; 12:00 p.m., ESPN2		Syracuse	W 84–62	7–1 (1–0)	22 – McKneely	6 – Bond III	8 – Beekman	John Paul Jones Arena (14,637); Charlottesville, VA
December 5, 2023*; 7:00 p.m., ACCNX/ESPN+		North Carolina Central	W 77–47	8–1	22 – McKneely	9 – Bond III	6 – Rohde	John Paul Jones Arena (13,459); Charlottesville, VA
December 16, 2023*; 6:00 p.m., ACCN	No. 22	Northeastern	W 56–54	9–1	21 – Beekman	6 – Beekman	6 – Rohde	John Paul Jones Arena (13,676); Charlottesville, VA
December 19, 2023*; 7:00 p.m., ESPN2	No. 22	at No. 23 Memphis	L 54–77	9–2	13 – Beekman	11 – Dunn	4 – Tied	FedExForum (13,553); Memphis, TN
December 27, 2023*; 7:00 p.m., ACCN		Morgan State	W 79–44	10–2	17 – Beekman	10 – Dunn	7 – Beekman	John Paul Jones Arena (14,637); Charlottesville, VA
December 30, 2023; 12:00 p.m., ACCN		at Notre Dame	L 54–76	10–3 (1–1)	15 – Beekman	5 – Dunn	4 – Beekman	Joyce Center (7,784); South Bend, IN
January 3, 2024; 7:00 p.m., ESPN2		Louisville	W 77–53	11–3 (2–1)	18 – McKneely	10 – Dunn	8 – Beekman	John Paul Jones Arena (13,703); Charlottesville, VA
January 6, 2024; 2:00 p.m., ACCN		at NC State	L 60–76	11–4 (2–2)	18 – McKneely	7 – Dunn	10 – Beekman	PNC Arena (14,821); Raleigh, NC
January 13, 2024; 2:00 p.m., ESPN2		at Wake Forest	L 47–66	11–5 (2–3)	10 – Beekman	5 – Tied	4 – Beekman	LJVM Coliseum (9,855); Winston-Salem, NC
January 17, 2024; 7:00 p.m., ESPNU		Virginia Tech; Rivalry	W 65–57	12–5 (3–3)	16 – Tied	7 – Dunn	5 – Harris	John Paul Jones Arena (14,547); Charlottesville, VA
January 20, 2024; 6:00 p.m., ACCN		at Georgia Tech	W 75–66	13–5 (4–3)	20 – McKneely	10 – Dunn	11 – Beekman	McCamish Pavilion (6,380); Atlanta, GA
January 24, 2024; 7:00 p.m., ACCN		NC State	W 59–53 ^{OT}	14–5 (5–3)	13 – Dunn	12 – Dunn	6 – Beekman	John Paul Jones Arena (13,947); Charlottesville, VA
January 27, 2024; 12:00 p.m., The CW		at Louisville	W 69–52	15–5 (6–3)	19 – Dunn	11 – Dunn	9 – Beekman	KFC Yum! Center (11,381); Louisville, KY
January 31, 2024; 7:00 p.m., ACCN		Notre Dame	W 65–53	16–5 (7–3)	21 – Beekman	6 – Minor	6 – Beekman	John Paul Jones Arena (13,947); Charlottesville, VA
February 3, 2024; 2:00 p.m., ESPN		at Clemson	W 66–65	17–5 (8–3)	17 – Groves	10 – Dunn	4 – Beekman	Littlejohn Coliseum (9,000); Clemson, SC
February 5, 2024; 7:00 p.m., ESPN		Miami (FL)	W 60–38	18–5 (9–3)	16 – Beekman	8 – Dunn	7 – Beekman	John Paul Jones Arena (14,165); Charlottesville, VA
February 10, 2024; 8:00 p.m., The CW		at Florida State	W 80–76	19–5 (10–3)	29 – McKneely	5 – Tied	5 – Beekman	Donald L. Tucker Civic Center (8,525); Tallahassee, FL
February 13, 2024; 7:00 p.m., ACCN	No. 21	Pittsburgh	L 63–74	19–6 (10–4)	19 – Beekman	6 – Beekman	6 – Rohde	John Paul Jones Arena (13,858); Charlottesville, VA
February 17, 2024; 12:00 p.m., ESPN2	No. 21	Wake Forest	W 49–47	20–6 (11–4)	20 – Beekman	9 – Dunn	4 – Tied	John Paul Jones Arena (14,637); Charlottesville, VA
February 19, 2024; 7:00 p.m., ESPN		at Virginia Tech; Rivalry	L 41–75	20–7 (11–5)	11 – McKneely	5 – Tied	2 – Tied	Cassell Coliseum (8,925); Blacksburg, VA
February 24, 2024; 4:00 p.m., ESPN		No. 10 North Carolina	L 44–54	20–8 (11–6)	12 – Minor	10 – Minor	5 – Beekman	John Paul Jones Arena (14,637); Charlottesville, VA
February 28, 2024; 9:00 p.m., ESPNU		at Boston College	W 72–68	21–8 (12–6)	18 – Beekman	13 – Dunn	8 – Beekman	Conte Forum (4,851); Chestnut Hill, MA
March 2, 2024; 6:00 p.m., ESPN		at No. 10 Duke	L 48–73	21–9 (12–7)	18 – Beekman	6 – Tied	7 – Beekman	Cameron Indoor Stadium (9,314); Durham, NC
March 9, 2024; 8:00 p.m., ACCN		Georgia Tech	W 72–57	22–9 (13–7)	21 – Beekman	6 – Tied	9 – Beekman	John Paul Jones Arena (13,877); Charlottesville, VA
ACC tournament
March 14, 2024; 9:30 pm, ESPN	(3)	vs. (11) Boston College; Quarterfinals	W 66–60 ^{OT}	23–9	15 – Groves	11 – Groves	11 – Beekman	Capital One Arena (17,627); Washington, D.C.
March 15, 2024; 9:30 pm, ESPN2	(3)	vs. (10) NC State; Semifinals	L 65–73 ^{OT}	23–10	23 – McKneely	9 – Tied	11 – Beekman	Capital One Arena (18,722); Washington, D.C.
NCAA tournament
March 19, 2024; 9:10 pm, TruTV	(10 MW)	vs. (10 MW) Colorado State; First Four	L 42–67	23–11	15 – Beekman	5 – Dunn	4 – Beekman	UD Arena (12,247); Dayton, Ohio
*Non-conference game. ^{#}Rankings from AP Poll. (#) Tournament seedings in parentheses. MW=Midwest. All times are in Eastern Time.

== Rankings ==
Ranking movements Legend: ██ Increase in ranking ██ Decrease in ranking — = Not ranked RV = Received votes т = Tied with team above or below
	Week																				
Poll	Pre	1	2	3	4	5	6	7	8	9	10	11	12	13	14	15	16	17	18	19	Final
AP	RV	RV	24	RV	RV	22	22	RV	—	—	—	—	RV	RV	21	RV	—	—	—	—	—
Coaches	RV	25т	18	RV	23	21	20	RV	—	—	—	—	RV	RV	23	RV	RV	—	—	—	—

*AP does not release post-NCAA Tournament rankings.
