= Ian Schieffelin =

American basketball player (born 2003)

- Schieffelin with Clemson in 2021

No. 20 – Sioux Falls Skyforce
- Position: Power forward
- League: NBA G League

Personal information
- Born: March 1, 2003 (age 23) Grayson, Georgia, U.S.
- Listed height: 6 ft 8 in (2.03 m)
- Listed weight: 240 lb (109 kg)

Career information
- High school: Grayson (Loganville, Georgia)
- College: Clemson (2021–2025)
- NBA draft: 2026: undrafted
- Playing career: 2026–present

Career history
- 2026–present: Sioux Falls Skyforce

Career highlights
- Second-team All-ACC (2025); ACC Most Improved Player (2024)
- Stats at NBA.com
- Stats at Basketball Reference

Ian Schieffelin (born March 1, 2003) is an American professional basketball player for the Sioux Falls Skyforce of the NBA G League. After playing four seasons of college basketball for the Clemson Tigers of the ACC, he entered the NCAA transfer portal, but announced that he would instead stay at Clemson and play college football for one season as a tight end.

== Early life ==
Schieffelin attended Grayson High School. Coming out of high school, Schieffelin was rated as a three-star recruit and committed to play college basketball for the Clemson Tigers over offers from schools such as Virginia Tech, Dayton, Richmond and Appalachian State.

== College basketball career ==
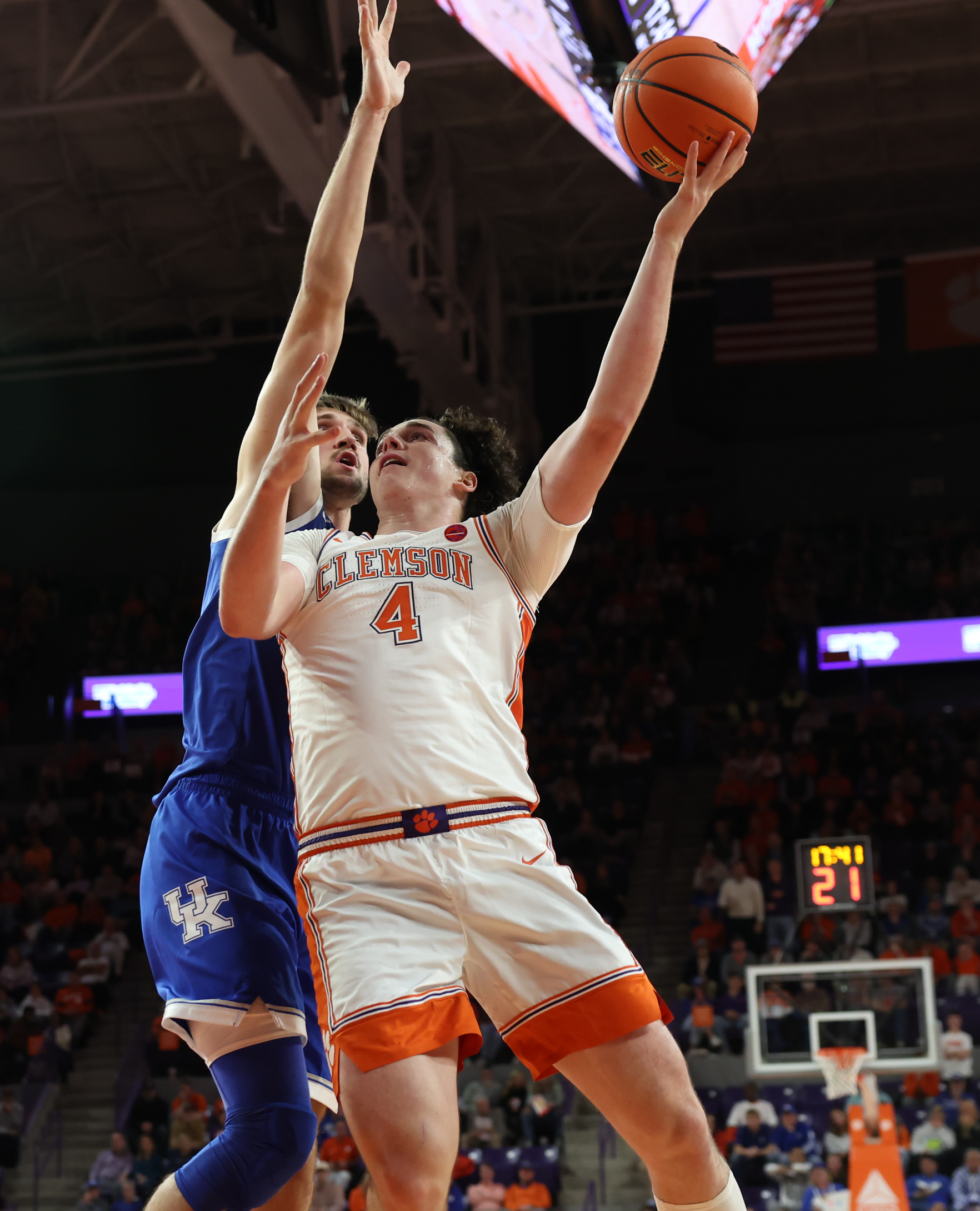
Schieffelin scoring a layup.

On February 8, 2022, Schieffelin recorded 12 points in a loss to North Carolina. During his freshman season, he appeared in 30 games with seven starts, where he averaged 3.1 points and 2.8 rebounds per game. As a sophomore in 2022-23, Schieffelin averaged 5.5 points and 4.1 rebounds per game. On December 3, 2023, he brought in 17 rebounds in a victory over Pittsburgh. During the 2023-24 season, Schieffelin averaged 9.7 points, 9.6 rebounds and 2.2 assists per game and was named the ACC most improved player.

On November 4, 2024, Schieffelin recorded eight points, nine rebounds, three assists, and two blocks in a victory against Charleston Southern. On December 3 he logged a career-high 20 rebounds in an upset win over #4 Kentucky. On February 26, 2025, Schieffelin notched a career-high 24 points, along with nine rebounds, three assists, and two steals in a win versus Notre Dame. On March 8, he notched 21 points and 13 rebounds in a win over Virginia Tech. For his performance during the 2024-25 season, Schieffelin was named to the all-ACC second team.

=== College statistics ===
Legend
GP	Games played	GS	Games started	MPG	Minutes per game
FG%	Field goal percentage	3P%	3-point field goal percentage	FT%	Free throw percentage
RPG	Rebounds per game	APG	Assists per game	SPG	Steals per game
BPG	Blocks per game	PPG	Points per game	**Bold**	Career high

Year	Team	GP	GS	MPG	FG%	3P%	FT%	RPG	APG	SPG	BPG	PPG
2021–22	Clemson	30	7	11.6	.395	.313	.714	2.8	0.9	0.2	0.2	3.1
2022–23	Clemson	34	22	19.8	.511	.333	.688	4.1	1.9	0.3	0.3	5.5
2023–24	Clemson	**36**	**36**	27.5	**.564**	**.469**	.731	**9.4**	2.2	0.6	0.5	10.1
2024–25	Clemson	32	32	**33.4**	.495	.341	**.741**	**9.4**	**2.7**	**0.8**	**0.7**	**12.4**
Career		134	99	23.5	.508	.373	.726	6.6	2.0	0.5	0.4	8.0

== College football ==
Schieffelin had entered the transfer portal after the 2024–25 season, hoping to receive a fifth season of eligibility to play basketball as a result of several pending lawsuits against the NCAA. (Note: Under NCAA rules, newly enrolled students normally have five years of athletic eligibility, but can only participate in a particular sport in four seasons.) However, he determined that even with favorable results, the lawsuits would not be resolved in time for him to play college basketball in 2025–26. In October 2024, Clemson football head coach Dabo Swinney made a social media post showing an interest in Schieffelin as a football prospect. Schieffelin did not take Swinney's post seriously at the time, but after a phone call Swinney made in April 2025 offering him a place on the Tigers' roster, he started considering a move to football. In the days after the call, he spoke about a potential transition to football with Indianapolis Colts tight end Mo Alie-Cox, who before signing with the Colts had not played football since his freshman year of high school and had started four basketball seasons at VCU. On May 2, Schieffelin announced on Instagram that he would join the Clemson roster as a tight end in 2025. The Tigers lost their starting tight end in 2024 to graduation, and going into the 2025 season, the other tight ends on the depth chart had combined for only 26 receptions in their college careers.

=== College statistics ===
Year	Team	GP	Receiving			
Year	Team	GP	Rec	Yds	Avg	TD
2025	Clemson	8	2	10	5.0	0
Career		8	2	10	5.0	0

== Professional basketball career ==
On September 25, 2026, the Miami Heat signed Schieffelin. He was waived on October 15. Schieffelin was named to the opening night roster of the Sioux Falls Skyforce.
