= 2023–24 NC State Wolfpack men's basketball team =

American college basketball season

2023–24 NC State Wolfpack men's basketball

ACC tournament champions

NCAA tournament, Final Four
- Conference: Atlantic Coast Conference

Ranking
- Coaches: No. 13
- AP: No. 10
- Record: 26–15 (9–11 ACC)
- Head coach: Kevin Keatts (7th season)
- Assistant coaches: Joel Justus; Kareem Richardson; Levi Watkins; Larry Dixon
- Home arena: PNC Arena

2023–24 ACC men's basketball standings
| | Conf. | | | | Overall |
| Team | W | | L | PCT | W | | L | PCT |
|---|---|---|---|---|---|---|---|---|
| No. 7 North Carolina | 17 | – | 3 | .850 | 29 | – | 8 | .784 |
| No. 9 Duke | 15 | – | 5 | .750 | 27 | – | 9 | .750 |
| Virginia | 13 | – | 7 | .650 | 23 | – | 11 | .676 |
| Pittsburgh | 12 | – | 8 | .600 | 22 | – | 11 | .667 |
| Wake Forest | 11 | – | 9 | .550 | 21 | – | 14 | .600 |
| No. 14 Clemson | 11 | – | 9 | .550 | 24 | – | 12 | .667 |
| Syracuse | 11 | – | 9 | .550 | 20 | – | 12 | .625 |
| Virginia Tech | 10 | – | 10 | .500 | 19 | – | 15 | .559 |
| Florida State | 10 | – | 10 | .500 | 17 | – | 16 | .515 |
| No. 10 NC State † | 9 | – | 11 | .450 | 26 | – | 15 | .634 |
| Boston College | 8 | – | 12 | .400 | 20 | – | 16 | .556 |
| Notre Dame | 7 | – | 13 | .350 | 13 | – | 20 | .394 |
| Georgia Tech | 7 | – | 13 | .350 | 14 | – | 18 | .438 |
| Miami (FL) | 6 | – | 14 | .300 | 15 | – | 17 | .469 |
| Louisville | 3 | – | 17 | .150 | 8 | – | 24 | .250 |
† 2024 ACC tournament winner Rankings from AP Poll

The 2023–24 NC State Wolfpack men's basketball team represented North Carolina State University during the 2023–24 NCAA Division I men's basketball season. The Wolfpack were led by seventh-year head coach Kevin Keatts and played their home games at PNC Arena in Raleigh, North Carolina as members of the Atlantic Coast Conference (ACC). The NC State Wolfpack men's basketball team drew an average home attendance of 13,491 in 17 games in 2023-24.

The Wolfpack finished the regular season on an uninspiring four-game losing streak, consequently posting a regular season record of 17–14 (9–11 in conference play) and slumping to the ACC tournament as the 10th seed. They then went on a miraculous run in the ACC tournament, winning five games in the span of five days (including a victory over ACC regular season champion and rival North Carolina) to win their first ACC tournament since 1987. They became the first team to win their conference tournament with five wins in five days since the 2010–11 Connecticut Huskies (of the Big East) and the second team overall to do it since the NCAA tournament began in 1939. This is the first time the Wolfpack made the NCAA tournament in consecutive years since they made the 2014 and 2015 tournament.

Receiving an #11 seed in the South region of the NCAA tournament, they continued their Cinderella run from the ACC tournament by defeating #6 Texas Tech in the first round, #14 Oakland in overtime in the second round, #2 Marquette in the Sweet Sixteen, and their ACC rivals #4 Duke in the Elite Eight. The Wolfpack made their first Final Four appearance since 1983 as a result, having won nine straight games since the end of the regular season. They became the sixth #11 seed to reach the Final Four and the first since UCLA in 2021. Their miraculous run came to an end with a Final Four loss to Purdue, closing their season with a 26–15 record.

== Previous season ==
The Wolfpack finished the 2022–23 season 23–11, 12–8 in ACC play to finish in sixth place. They defeated Virginia Tech before losing to Clemson in the ACC tournament. They received an at-large bid to the NCAA tournament as the No. 11 seed in the South region. There they lost to Creighton in the first round.

== Offseason ==
=== Departures ===
Departures
| Name | Number | Pos. | Height | Weight | Year | Hometown | Reason for departure |
|---|---|---|---|---|---|---|---|
| Terquavion Smith | 0 | G | 6'4" | 165 | Sophomore | Greenville, NC | Declare for 2023 NBA draft/undrafted; signed with the Philadelphia 76ers |
| Jarkel Joiner | 1 | G | 6'1" | 180 | GS Senior | Oxford, MS | Graduated |
| Isaiah Miranda | 3 | F | 7'1" | 205 | Freshman | Pawtucket, RI | Transferred to Oklahoma State |
| Jack Clark | 5 | G | 6'8" | 200 | RS Senior | Wyncote, PA | Graduate transferred to Clemson |
| Dusan Mahorcic | 11 | F | 6'10" | 225 | RS Senior | Belgrade, Serbia | Graduate transferred to Duquesne |
| Chase Graham | 12 | G | 6'1" | 180 | Senior | Raleigh, NC | Walk-on; Graduated |
| Ebenezer Dowuona | 21 | F | 6'11" | 225 | Junior | Accra, Ghana | Transferred to Georgia Tech |
| Greg Gantt | 23 | F | 6'8" | 215 | RS Junior | Fayetteville, NC | Transferred to UNC Asheville |

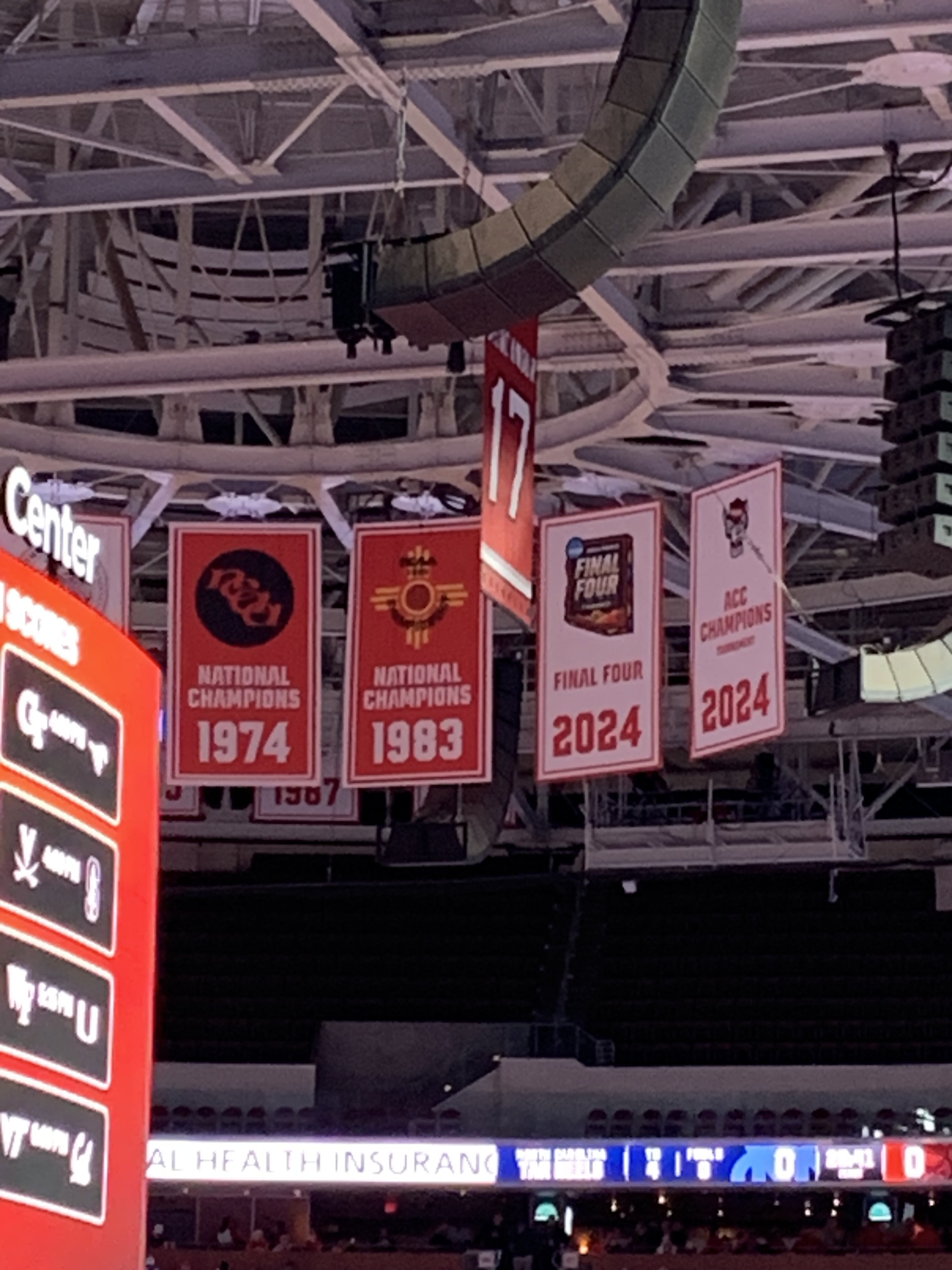
Final Four and ACC Championship banners

=== Incoming transfers ===
Incoming transfers
| Name | Number | Pos. | Height | Weight | Year | Hometown | Previous school |
|---|---|---|---|---|---|---|---|
| DJ Horne | 0 | G | 6'1" | 175 | GS Senior | Raleigh, NC | Arizona State |
| Jayden Taylor | 1 | G | 6'4" | 195 | Junior | Indianapolis, IN | Butler |
| Kam Woods | 2 | G | 6'2" | 185 | Junior | Bessemer, AL | North Carolina A&T |
| M. J. Rice | 3 | G | 6'5" | 200 | Sophomore | Durham, NC | Kansas |
| Michael O'Connell | 12 | G | 6'2" | 195 | Senior | Mineola, NY | Stanford |
| Mohamed Diarra | 23 | F | 6'10" | 215 | Senior | Paris, France | Missouri |
| Ben Middlebrooks | 34 | F/C | 6'10" | 232 | Junior | Fort Lauderdale, FL | Clemson |

=== 2023 recruiting class ===
College recruiting information
| Name | Hometown | School | Height | Weight | Commit date |
|---|---|---|---|---|---|
| Dennis Parker Jr. #31 SF | Richmond, VA | John Marshall High School | 6 ft 6 in (1.98 m) | 175 lb (79 kg) | Oct 26, 2022 |
| Dennis Parker Jr. #31 SF | Recruit ratings: Rivals: 247Sports: ESPN: (81) | | | | |
Overall recruit ranking:
Note: In many cases, Scout, Rivals, 247Sports, On3, and ESPN may conflict in their listings of height and weight.; In these cases, the average was taken. ESPN grades are on a 100-point scale.; Sources: "2023 Team Ranking". Rivals.

=== 2024 recruiting class ===
College recruiting information (2024)
| Name | Hometown | School | Height | Weight | Commit date |
|---|---|---|---|---|---|
| Paul McNeil #15 SF | Rockingham, NC | Richmond Senior High School | 6 ft 5 in (1.96 m) | 180 lb (82 kg) | Feb 20, 2023 |
| Paul McNeil #15 SF | Recruit ratings: Rivals: 247Sports: ESPN: (87) | | | | |
| Tremayne Parker #26 SG | Atlanta, GA | Overtime Elite | 6 ft 1 in (1.85 m) | 166 lb (75 kg) | Nov 16, 2022 |
| Tremayne Parker #26 SG | Recruit ratings: Rivals: 247Sports: ESPN: (82) | | | | |
Overall recruit ranking:
Note: In many cases, Scout, Rivals, 247Sports, On3, and ESPN may conflict in their listings of height and weight.; In these cases, the average was taken. ESPN grades are on a 100-point scale.; Sources: "2024 Team Ranking". Rivals.

== Roster ==
2023–24 NC State Wolfpack men's basketball team
Players
Coaches

| Pos. | # | Name | Height | Weight | Year | Previous school | Hometown |
|---|---|---|---|---|---|---|---|
| G | 0 | DJ Horne | 6 ft 1 in (1.85 m) | 175 lb (79 kg) | GS | Trinity Academy; Arizona State | Raleigh, North Carolina |
| G | 1 | Jayden Taylor | 6 ft 4 in (1.93 m) | 195 lb (88 kg) | Jr | Perry Meridian; Butler | Indianapolis, IN |
| G | 2 | Kam Woods | 6 ft 2 in (1.88 m) | 185 lb (84 kg) | So | Pinson Valley; North Carolina A&T | Bessemer, Alabama |
| G | 3 | M. J. Rice | 6 ft 5 in (1.96 m) | 215 lb (98 kg) | So | Prolific Prep (CA); Kansas | Henderson, North Carolina |
| G | 4 | LJ Thomas | 6 ft 2 in (1.88 m) | 205 lb (93 kg) | So | Bull Durham Prep (NC) | Plant City, Florida |
| G | 10 | Breon Pass | 6 ft 0 in (1.83 m) | 175 lb (79 kg) | Jr | Reidsville | Reidsville, North Carolina |
| G | 11 | Dennis Parker Jr. | 6 ft 6 in (1.98 m) | 205 lb (93 kg) | Fr | John Marshall | Richmond, Virginia |
| G | 12 | Michael O'Connell | 6 ft 2 in (1.88 m) | 195 lb (88 kg) | Sr | Blair Academy; Stanford | Mineola, New York |
| G | 13 | KJ Keatts (W) | 5 ft 10 in (1.78 m) | 165 lb (75 kg) | So | Grace Christian School | Cary, North Carolina |
| G | 14 | Casey Morsell | 6 ft 3 in (1.91 m) | 200 lb (91 kg) | GS | St. John's College; Virginia | Fort Washington, Maryland |
| G | 20 | Alex Nunnally (W) | 6 ft 2 in (1.88 m) | 180 lb (82 kg) | Jr | Cary Academy | Cary, North Carolina |
| G | 22 | Jordan Snell (W) | 6 ft 2 in (1.88 m) | 155 lb (70 kg) | So | Panther Creek | Cary, North Carolina |
| F | 23 | Mohamed Diarra | 6 ft 10 in (2.08 m) | 215 lb (98 kg) | Jr | Redemption Academy (NY); Missouri | Paris, France |
| F | 24 | Ernest Ross | 6 ft 9 in (2.06 m) | 200 lb (91 kg) | Jr | Santa Fe | Alachua, Florida |
| F | 30 | D. J. Burns | 6 ft 9 in (2.06 m) | 275 lb (125 kg) | GS | York Preparatory Academy; Winthrop | Rock Hill, South Carolina |
| F | 34 | Ben Middlebrooks | 6 ft 10 in (2.08 m) | 240 lb (109 kg) | Jr | Westminster Academy; Clemson | Fort Lauderdale, Florida |

Head coach

- Kevin Keatts (Ferrum)

Assistant coach(es)

- Joel Justus (UNC Wilmington)
- Kareem Richardson (Evansville)
- Levi Watkins (NC State)
- Larry Dixon (Johnson C. Smith)

Legend

- (C) Team captain
- (S) Suspended
- (I) Ineligible
- (W) Walk-on
- Injured
- Current redshirt

Roster

== Schedule and results ==
| Date time, TV | Rank^{#} | Opponent^{#} | Result | Record | High points | High rebounds | High assists | Site (attendance) city, state |
Exhibition
| November 1, 2023*; 7:00 p.m. | | Mount Olive | W 89–79 | – | 14 – Morsell | 7 – Tied | 3 – Tied | PNC Arena (–); Raleigh, NC |
Regular season
| November 6, 2023*; 7:00 p.m., ACCNX/ESPN+ | | The Citadel | W 72–59 | 1–0 | 14 – Morsell | 7 – Tied | 3 – Tied | PNC Arena (12,488); Raleigh, NC |
| November 10, 2023*; 7:00 p.m., ACCNX/ESPN+ | | Abilene Christian | W 84–64 | 2–0 | 22 – Taylor | 10 – Diarra | 4 – Burns | PNC Arena (12,554); Raleigh, NC |
| November 17, 2023*; 7:00 p.m., ACCNX/ESPN+ | | Charleston Southern | W 87–53 | 3–0 | 18 – Horne | 6 – Horne | 4 – Taylor | PNC Arena (12,331); Raleigh, NC |
| November 23, 2023*; 10:00 p.m., ESPN2 | | vs. Vanderbilt; Vegas Showdown semifinals | W 84–78 | 4–0 | 18 – Tied | 9 – Tied | 4 – Tied | Michelob Ultra Arena; Paradise, NV |
| November 24, 2023*; 10:00 p.m., ESPN2 | | vs. BYU; Vegas Showdown | L 86–95 | 4–1 | 28 – Morsell | 7 – Burns | 4 – Burns | Michelob Ultra Arena (2,647); Paradise, NV |
| November 28, 2023*; 9:00 p.m., ESPN2 | | at Ole Miss; ACC–SEC Challenge | L 52–72 | 4–2 | 13 – Middlebrooks | 11 – Middlebrooks | 4 – Thomas | SJB Pavilion (7,465); Oxford, MS |
| December 2, 2023; 4:00 p.m., ACCN | | at Boston College | W 84–78 ^{OT} | 5–2 (1–0) | 21 – Horne | 18 – Diarra | 5 – Horne | Conte Forum (5,249); Chestnut Hill, MA |
| December 6, 2023*; 7:00 p.m., ACCNX/ESPN+ | | Maryland Eastern Shore | W 93–61 | 6–2 | 21 – Taylor | 6 – Rice | 4 – Horne | Reynolds Coliseum (5,500); Raleigh, NC |
| December 12, 2023*; 7:00 p.m., ACCN | | UT Martin | W 81–67 | 7–2 | 22 – Horne | 12 – Burns | 4 – Burns | PNC Arena (11,326); Raleigh, NC |
| December 16, 2023*; 10:00 p.m., ESPN2 | | vs. No. 12 Tennessee; Basketball Hall of Fame San Antonio | L 70–79 | 7–3 | 16 – Horne | 5 – Burns | 5 – Burns | Frost Bank Center (2,481); San Antonio, TX |
| December 20, 2023*; 7:00 p.m., ACCNX/ESPN+ | | Saint Louis | W 82–70 | 8–3 | 21 – Morsell | 7 – Parker | 3 – Burns | PNC Arena (12,555); Raleigh, NC |
| December 23, 2023*; 1:00 p.m., ACCN | | Detroit Mercy | W 83–66 | 9–3 | 26 – Horne | 7 – Tied | 6 – Tied | PNC Arena (12,594); Raleigh, NC |
| January 3, 2024; 9:00 p.m., ACCN | | at Notre Dame | W 54–52 | 10–3 (2–0) | 13 – Burns | 6 – Diarra | 2 – Burns | Joyce Center (4,727); South Bend, IN |
| January 6, 2024; 2:00 p.m., ACCN | | Virginia | W 76–60 | 11–3 (3–0) | 15 – Tied | 7 – Middlebrooks | 5 – O'Connell | PNC Arena (14,821); Raleigh, NC |
| January 10, 2024; 8:00 p.m., ESPN | | No. 7 North Carolina; Rivalry | L 54–67 | 11–4 (3–1) | 12 – Morsell | 10 – Horne | 4 – Horne | PNC Arena (19,500); Raleigh, NC |
| January 13, 2024; 12:00 p.m., The CW | | at Louisville | W 89–83 | 12–4 (4–1) | 27 – Horne | 11 – Diarra | 6 – O'Connell | KFC Yum! Center (12,114); Louisville, KY |
| January 16, 2024; 7:00 p.m., ACCN | | Wake Forest; Rivalry | W 83–76 | 13–4 (5–1) | 21 – Horne | 13 – Diarra | 3 – Horne | PNC Arena (13,836); Raleigh, NC |
| January 20, 2024; 12:00 p.m., The CW | | Virginia Tech | L 78–84 | 13–5 (5–2) | 19 – Morsell | 8 – Diarra | 5 – O'Connell | PNC Arena (15,580); Raleigh, NC |
| January 24, 2024; 7:00 p.m., ACCN | | at Virginia | L 53–59 ^{OT} | 13–6 (5–3) | 13 – Morsell | 8 – Diarra | 2 – Tied | John Paul Jones Arena (13,947); Charlottesville, VA |
| January 27, 2024; 7:00 p.m., ACCN | | at Syracuse | L 65–77 | 13–7 (5–4) | 15 – Horne | 7 – Parker Jr. | 4 – Horne | JMA Wireless Dome (21,814); Syracuse, NY |
| January 30, 2024; 9:00 p.m., ESPN2 | | Miami (FL) | W 74–68 | 14–7 (6–4) | 24 – Horne | 7 – Taylor | 5 – O'Connell | PNC Arena (12,194); Raleigh, NC |
| February 3, 2024; 5:30 p.m., The CW | | Georgia Tech | W 82–76 | 15–7 (7–4) | 26 – Horne | 10 – Burns | 6 – O'Connell | PNC Arena (15,523); Raleigh, NC |
| February 7, 2024; 7:00 p.m., ESPNU | | Pittsburgh | L 64–67 | 15–8 (7–5) | 25 – Horne | 5 – Tied | 4 – O'Connell | PNC Arena (11,366); Raleigh, NC |
| February 10, 2024; 4:00 p.m., ACCN | | at Wake Forest; Rivalry | L 79–83 | 15–9 (7–6) | 31 – Horne | 12 – Diarra | 5 – Taylor | LJVM Coliseum (12,571); Winston-Salem, NC |
| February 17, 2024; 7:45 p.m., The CW | | at Clemson | W 78–77 | 16–9 (8–6) | 27 – Horne | 9 – Diarra | 4 – Burns | Littlejohn Coliseum (9,000); Clemson, SC |
| February 20, 2024; 7:00 p.m., ESPN2 | | Syracuse | L 83–87 | 16–10 (8–7) | 32 – Horne | 10 – Middlebrooks | 4 – Burns | PNC Arena (12,766); Raleigh, NC |
| February 24, 2024; 2:00 p.m., ACCN | | Boston College | W 81–70 | 17–10 (9–7) | 19 – Burns | 9 – Tied | 6 – O'Connell | PNC Arena (14,642); Raleigh, NC |
| February 27, 2024; 9:00 p.m., ESPN2 | | at Florida State | L 83–90 | 17–11 (9–8) | 24 – Taylor | 10 – Diarra | 6 – Morsell | Donald L. Tucker Civic Center (4,727); Tallahassee, FL |
| March 2, 2024; 4:00 p.m., ESPN | | at No. 9 North Carolina; Rivalry | L 70–79 | 17–12 (9–9) | 22 – Taylor | 8 – Diarra | 3 – Morsell | Dean Smith Center (21,750); Chapel Hill, NC |
| March 4, 2024; 7:00 p.m., ESPN | | No. 9 Duke | L 64–79 | 17–13 (9–10) | 27 – Burns | 7 – Diarra | 4 – Burns | PNC Arena (19,500); Raleigh, NC |
| March 9, 2024; 7:45 p.m., The CW | | at Pittsburgh | L 73–81 | 17–14 (9–11) | 28 – Taylor | 9 – Diarra | 4 – Burns | Petersen Events Center (10,700); Pittsburgh, PA |
ACC tournament
| March 12, 2024; 4:30 p.m., ACCN | (10) | vs. (15) Louisville; First Round | W 94–85 | 18–14 | 25 – Morsell | 8 – Taylor | 3 – Tied | Capital One Arena (7,523); Washington, D.C. |
| March 13, 2024; 7:00 p.m., ESPN2 | (10) | vs. (7) Syracuse; Second Round | W 83–65 | 19–14 | 18 – Taylor | 14 – Diarra | 6 – Diarra | Capital One Arena (13,445); Washington, D.C. |
| March 14, 2024; 7:00 p.m., ESPN | (10) | vs. (2) No. 11 Duke; Quarterfinals | W 74–69 | 20–14 | 18 – Horne | 16 – Diarra | 4 – Tied | Capital One Arena (17,627); Washington, D.C. |
| March 15, 2024; 9:30 p.m., ESPN2 | (10) | vs. (3) Virginia; Semifinals | W 73–65 ^{OT} | 21–14 | 19 – Burns | 12 – Diarra | 3 – O'Connell | Capital One Arena (18,722); Washington, D.C. |
| March 16, 2024; 8:30 p.m., ESPN | (10) | vs. (1) No. 4 North Carolina; Championship | W 84–76 | 22–14 | 29 – Horne | 14 – Diarra | 7 – Burns | Capital One Arena (19,218); Washington, D.C. |
NCAA tournament
| March 21, 2024*; 9:40 p.m., CBS | (11 S) | vs. (6 S) No. 22 Texas Tech; First Round | W 80–67 | 23–14 | 21 – Middlebrooks | 12 – Diarra | 6 – O'Connell | PPG Paints Arena (18,586); Pittsburgh, PA |
| March 23, 2024*; 7:10 p.m., TBS/truTV | (11 S) | vs. (14 S) Oakland; Second Round | W 79–73 ^{OT} | 24–14 | 24 – Burns | 13 – Diarra | 8 – O'Connell | PPG Paints Arena (18,595); Pittsburgh, PA |
| March 29, 2024*; 7:09 p.m., CBS | (11 S) | vs. (2 S) No. 8 Marquette; Sweet Sixteen | W 67–58 | 25–14 | 19 – Horne | 15 – Diarra | 7 – Burns | American Airlines Center (18,751); Dallas, TX |
| March 31, 2024*; 5:05 p.m., CBS | (11 S) | vs. (4 S) No. 13 Duke; Elite Eight | W 76–64 | 26–14 | 29 – Burns | 11 – O’Connell | 6 – O’Connell | American Airlines Center (16,969); Dallas, TX |
| April 6, 2024; 6:09 p.m., TBS | (11 S) | vs. (1 MW) No. 3 Purdue; Final Four | L 50–63 | 26–15 | 20 – Horne | 7 – Middlebrooks | 4 – Burns | State Farm Stadium (74,720); Glendale, AZ |
*Non-conference game. ^{#}Rankings from AP Poll. (#) Tournament seedings in parentheses. S=South region. MW=Midwest Region. All times are in Eastern Time.

== Rankings ==
Ranking movements Legend: ██ Increase in ranking ██ Decrease in ranking — = Not ranked RV = Received votes
| | Week | | | | | | | | | | | | | | | | | | | | |
| Poll | Pre | 1 | 2 | 3 | 4 | 5 | 6 | 7 | 8 | 9 | 10 | 11 | 12 | 13 | 14 | 15 | 16 | 17 | 18 | 19 | Final |
|---|---|---|---|---|---|---|---|---|---|---|---|---|---|---|---|---|---|---|---|---|---|
| AP | — | — | — | — | — | — | — | — | — | RV | RV | RV | — | — | — | — | — | — | — | RV | 10 |
| Coaches | — | RV | RV | — | — | — | — | — | — | — | RV | — | — | — | — | — | — | — | — | RV | 13 |
