= 2023–24 Duke Blue Devils men's basketball team =

Duke University sports team

2023–24 Duke Blue Devils men's basketball

NCAA tournament, Elite Eight
- Conference: Atlantic Coast Conference

Ranking
- Coaches: No. 9
- AP: No. 9
- Record: 27–9 (15–5 ACC)
- Head coach: Jon Scheyer (2nd season)
- Associate head coach: Chris Carrawell
- Assistant coaches: Jai Lucas; Will Avery; Emanuel Dildy
- Home arena: Cameron Indoor Stadium

2023–24 ACC men's basketball standings
| | Conf. | | | | Overall |
| Team | W | | L | PCT | W | | L | PCT |
|---|---|---|---|---|---|---|---|---|
| No. 7 North Carolina | 17 | – | 3 | .850 | 29 | – | 8 | .784 |
| No. 9 Duke | 15 | – | 5 | .750 | 27 | – | 9 | .750 |
| Virginia | 13 | – | 7 | .650 | 23 | – | 11 | .676 |
| Pittsburgh | 12 | – | 8 | .600 | 22 | – | 11 | .667 |
| Wake Forest | 11 | – | 9 | .550 | 21 | – | 14 | .600 |
| No. 14 Clemson | 11 | – | 9 | .550 | 24 | – | 12 | .667 |
| Syracuse | 11 | – | 9 | .550 | 20 | – | 12 | .625 |
| Virginia Tech | 10 | – | 10 | .500 | 19 | – | 15 | .559 |
| Florida State | 10 | – | 10 | .500 | 17 | – | 16 | .515 |
| No. 10 NC State † | 9 | – | 11 | .450 | 26 | – | 15 | .634 |
| Boston College | 8 | – | 12 | .400 | 20 | – | 16 | .556 |
| Notre Dame | 7 | – | 13 | .350 | 13 | – | 20 | .394 |
| Georgia Tech | 7 | – | 13 | .350 | 14 | – | 18 | .438 |
| Miami (FL) | 6 | – | 14 | .300 | 15 | – | 17 | .469 |
| Louisville | 3 | – | 17 | .150 | 8 | – | 24 | .250 |
† 2024 ACC tournament winner Rankings from AP Poll

The 2023–24 Duke Blue Devils men's basketball team represented Duke University during the 2023–24 NCAA Division I men's basketball season. The Blue Devils were led by second-year head coach Jon Scheyer. They played their home games at Cameron Indoor Stadium in Durham, North Carolina, as a member of the Atlantic Coast Conference.

The Blue Devils started the season ranked second in the nation, and dominated Dartmouth in their season opener. The schedule became more difficult as they lost by four points to twelfth-ranked Arizona. They followed the loss with a defeat of eighteenth-ranked Michigan State in the Champions Classic. They went on to win three straight games before losing at Arkansas in the ACC–SEC Challenge. They were defeated by Georgia Tech by four points in their ACC opener. After back-to-back defeats, the Blue Devils went on to win eight straight games. This included wins over tenth-ranked Baylor and a defeat over Georgia Tech to avenge the previous loss. The winning streak was broken with a four-point loss to Pittsburgh. They won their next three games before a rivalry matchup with North Carolina. North Carolina won by nine points, but the Blue Devils won their next five straight games. Duke lost two of their last five games, with one loss coming at in-state rival Wake Forest and the other being a final-day loss to North Carolina.

The Blue Devils finished the season 27–9 and 15–5 in ACC play to finish in second place. As the second seed in the ACC tournament, they earned a bye to the quarterfinals, where they were upset by in-state rival and tenth-seed NC State. They received an at-large bid to the 2024 NCAA Division I Men's Basketball Tournament, where they were the 4th seed in the South Region. They faced Vermont in the first round. They won this matchup to move on to the round of 32, where they routed 12th seed James Madison. Duke then faced the number one seed, Houston, whom they defeated 54–51, advancing to the Elite Eight for the first time under head coach Jon Scheyer. There, they were once again upset by 11th-seeded NC State to end their season.

== Previous season ==
The Blue Devils finished the 2022–23 season 27–9, 14–6 in ACC play to finish in a three-way tie for third place. As the No. 4 seed in the ACC tournament, they defeated Pittsburgh, Miami, and Virginia to win the tournament championship. The championship was their 22nd ACC tournament victory in program history. As a result, they received the conference's automatic bid to the NCAA tournament as the No. 5 seed in the East region. There, they defeated Oral Roberts before losing in the second round to Tennessee.

== Offseason ==
=== Departures ===
Departures
| Name | Number | Pos. | Height | Weight | Year | Hometown | Reason for departure |
|---|---|---|---|---|---|---|---|
| Dariq Whitehead | 0 | F | 6'7" | 220 | Freshman | Newark, NJ | Declared for 2023 NBA draft; selected 22nd overall by Brooklyn Nets |
| Dereck Lively II | 1 | C | 7'1" | 230 | Freshman | Philadelphia, PA | Declared for 2023 NBA draft; selected 12th overall by Oklahoma City Thunder |
| Kale Catchings | 12 | F | 6'5" | 215 | GS senior | O'Fallon, MO | Graduated |
| Jacob Grandison | 13 | G | 6'6" | 190 | GS senior | Oakland, CA | Graduated |
| Max Johns | 41 | G | 6'5" | 205 | GS senior | High Point, NC | Walk-on; graduated |

==== Incoming transfers ====
Incoming transfers
| Name | Number | Pos. | Height | Weight | Year | Hometown | Previous school |
|---|---|---|---|---|---|---|---|
| Neal Begovich | 20 | F | 6'9" | 230 | RS senior | San Francisco, CA | Stanford |

==== Recruiting classes ====
===== 2023 recruiting class =====
College recruiting
| Name | Hometown | School | Height | Weight | Commit date |
|---|---|---|---|---|---|
| Caleb Foster #4 PG | Harrisburg, NC | Notre Dame (CA) | 6 ft 5 in (1.96 m) | 197 lb (89 kg) | Sep 16, 2021 |
| Caleb Foster #4 PG | Recruit ratings: Rivals: 247Sports: ESPN: (89) | | | | |
| Sean Stewart #6 PF | Windermere, FL | Montverde Academy | 6 ft 9 in (2.06 m) | 227 lb (103 kg) | Dec 23, 2021 |
| Sean Stewart #6 PF | Recruit ratings: Rivals: 247Sports: ESPN: (89) | | | | |
| Jared McCain #3 SG | Sacramento, CA | Centennial High School | 6 ft 3 in (1.91 m) | 197 lb (89 kg) | Mar 18, 2022 |
| Jared McCain #3 SG | Recruit ratings: Rivals: 247Sports: ESPN: (92) | | | | |
| TJ Power #4 PF | Shrewsbury, MA | Worcester Academy | 6 ft 9 in (2.06 m) | 216 lb (98 kg) | Sep 7, 2022 |
| TJ Power #4 PF | Recruit ratings: Rivals: 247Sports: ESPN: (88) | | | | |
Overall recruit ranking:
Note: In many cases, Scout, Rivals, 247Sports, On3, and ESPN may conflict in their listings of height and weight.; In these cases, the average was taken. ESPN grades are on a 100-point scale.; Sources: "2023 Team Ranking". Rivals.

===== 2024 recruiting class =====
College recruiting
| Name | Hometown | School | Height | Weight | Commit date |
|---|---|---|---|---|---|
| Darren Harris #14 SF | Fairfax, VA | Paul VI Catholic | 6 ft 6 in (1.98 m) | 195 lb (88 kg) | Oct 22, 2022 |
| Darren Harris #14 SF | Recruit ratings: Rivals: 247Sports: ESPN: (87) | | | | |
| Isaiah Evans #3 SF | Huntersville, NC | North Mecklenburg | 6 ft 6 in (1.98 m) | 170 lb (77 kg) | Apr 27, 2023 |
| Isaiah Evans #3 SF | Recruit ratings: Rivals: 247Sports: ESPN: (92) | | | | |
| Kon Knueppel #5 SF | Milwaukee, WI | Wisconsin Lutheran | 6 ft 5 in (1.96 m) | 205 lb (93 kg) | Sep 21, 2023 |
| Kon Knueppel #5 SF | Recruit ratings: Rivals: 247Sports: ESPN: (89) | | | | |
| Cooper Flagg #1 PF | Newport, ME | Montverde Academy | 6 ft 9 in (2.06 m) | 195 lb (88 kg) | Oct 30, 2023 |
| Cooper Flagg #1 PF | Recruit ratings: Rivals: 247Sports: ESPN: (97) | | | | |
| Patrick Ngongba II #5 C | Fairfax, VA | Paul VI Catholic | 6 ft 11 in (2.11 m) | 235 lb (107 kg) | Nov 4, 2023 |
| Patrick Ngongba II #5 C | Recruit ratings: Rivals: 247Sports: ESPN: (90) | | | | |
| Khaman Maluach #1 C | Rumbek, South Sudan | NBA Academy Africa | 7 ft 1 in (2.16 m) | 250 lb (110 kg) | Mar 6, 2024 |
| Khaman Maluach #1 C | Recruit ratings: Rivals: 247Sports: ESPN: (97) | | | | |
Overall recruit ranking:
Note: In many cases, Scout, Rivals, 247Sports, On3, and ESPN may conflict in their listings of height and weight.; In these cases, the average was taken. ESPN grades are on a 100-point scale.; Sources: "2024 Team Ranking". Rivals.

== Roster ==
2023–24 Duke Blue Devils men's basketball team
Players
Coaches

| Pos. | # | Name | Height | Weight | Year | Previous school | Hometown |
|---|---|---|---|---|---|---|---|
| G | 0 | Jared McCain | 6 ft 3 in (1.91 m) | 197 lb (89 kg) | Fr | Centennial | Sacramento, CA |
| G | 1 | Caleb Foster | 6 ft 5 in (1.96 m) | 197 lb (89 kg) | Fr | Notre Dame (CA) | Harrisburg, NC |
| G | 2 | Jaylen Blakes | 6 ft 2 in (1.88 m) | 204 lb (93 kg) | Jr | Blair Academy | Somerset, NJ |
| G | 3 | Jeremy Roach | 6 ft 2 in (1.88 m) | 180 lb (82 kg) | Sr | Paul VI Catholic | Leesburg, VA |
| G | 5 | Tyrese Proctor | 6 ft 5 in (1.96 m) | 183 lb (83 kg) | So | NBA Global Academy | Sydney, Australia |
| F | 12 | TJ Power | 6 ft 9 in (2.06 m) | 216 lb (98 kg) | Fr | Worcester Academy | Shrewsbury, MA |
| F | 13 | Sean Stewart | 6 ft 9 in (2.06 m) | 227 lb (103 kg) | Fr | Montverde Academy | Windermere, FL |
| G | 14 | Jaden Schutt | 6 ft 5 in (1.96 m) | 190 lb (86 kg) | So | Yorkville | Yorkville, IL |
| C | 15 | Ryan Young | 6 ft 10 in (2.08 m) | 238 lb (108 kg) | GS | Northwestern | Stewartsville, NJ |
| F | 20 | Neal Begovich (W) | 6 ft 9 in (2.06 m) | 230 lb (104 kg) | RS Sr | Stanford | San Francisco, CA |
| C | 21 | Christian Reeves | 7 ft 1 in (2.16 m) | 261 lb (118 kg) | So | Oak Hill Academy | Charlotte, NC |
| F | 25 | Mark Mitchell | 6 ft 8 in (2.03 m) | 232 lb (105 kg) | So | Sunrise Christian Academy | Kansas City, KS |
| C | 30 | Kyle Filipowski | 7 ft 0 in (2.13 m) | 248 lb (112 kg) | So | Wilbraham & Monson Academy | Westtown, NY |
| C | 52 | Stanley Borden (W) | 7 ft 0 in (2.13 m) | 241 lb (109 kg) | Jr | Istanbul International Community School | Istanbul, Turkey |
| G | 55 | Spencer Hubbard (W) | 5 ft 8 in (1.73 m) | 157 lb (71 kg) | Sr | Harvard-Westlake | Los Angeles, CA |

Head coach

- Jon Scheyer (Duke)

Assistant coach(es)

- Chris Carrawell (Duke)
- Jai Lucas (Texas)
- Will Avery (Duke)
- Emanuel Dildy (Eastern Illinois)

Legend

- (C) Team captain
- (S) Suspended
- (I) Ineligible
- (W) Walk-on
- Injured
- Current redshirt

Roster

== Schedule and results ==
| Date time, TV | Rank^{#} | Opponent^{#} | Result | Record | High points | High rebounds | High assists | Site (attendance) city, state |
Exhibition
| November 1, 2023*; 7:00 p.m., ACCNX/ESPN+ | No. 2 | UNC Pembroke | W 109–64 | – | 17 – Filipowski | 6 – Tied | 3 – Tied | Cameron Indoor Stadium (9,314); Durham, NC |
Regular season
| November 6, 2023*; 6:00 p.m., ACCN | No. 2 | Dartmouth | W 92–54 | 1–0 | 25 – Filipowski | 7 – Tied | 8 – Proctor | Cameron Indoor Stadium (9,314); Durham, NC |
| November 10, 2023*; 7:00 p.m., ESPN2 | No. 2 | No. 12 Arizona | L 73–78 | 1–1 | 25 – Filipowski | 8 – Filipowski | 5 – Tied | Cameron Indoor Stadium (9,314); Durham, NC |
| November 14, 2023*; 7:00 p.m., ESPN | No. 9 | vs. No. 18 Michigan State; Champions Classic | W 74–65 | 2–1 | 18 – Foster | 8 – Filipowski | 6 – Proctor | United Center (18,780); Chicago, IL |
| November 17, 2023*; 6:00 p.m., ACCN | No. 9 | Bucknell; Blue Devil Challenge | W 90–60 | 3–1 | 20 – Mitchell | 10 – McCain | 6 – Foster | Cameron Indoor Stadium (9,314); Durham, NC |
| November 21, 2023*; 7:00 p.m., ACCN | No. 9 | La Salle; Blue Devil Challenge | W 95–66 | 4–1 | 22 – Proctor | 10 – Stewart | 4 – Tied | Cameron Indoor Stadium (9,314); Durham, NC |
| November 24, 2023*; 6:00 p.m., ACCN | No. 9 | Southern Indiana; Blue Devil Challenge | W 80–62 | 5–1 | 21 – Filipowski | 14 – Filipowski | 7 – Proctor | Cameron Indoor Stadium (9,314); Durham, NC |
| November 29, 2023*; 9:15 p.m., ESPN | No. 7 | at Arkansas; ACC–SEC Challenge | L 75–80 | 5–2 | 26 – Filipowski | 10 – Tied | 4 – Proctor | Bud Walton Arena (20,344); Fayetteville, AR |
| December 2, 2023; 2:15 p.m., The CW | No. 7 | at Georgia Tech | L 68–72 | 5–3 (0–1) | 20 – Roach | 9 – Filipowski | 5 – Filipowski | McCamish Pavilion (7,758); Atlanta, GA |
| December 9, 2023*; 2:15 p.m., The CW | No. 22 | Charlotte | W 80–56 | 6–3 | 21 – McCain | 13 – Filipowski | 4 – Filipowski | Cameron Indoor Stadium (9,314); Durham, NC |
| December 12, 2023*; 7:00 p.m., ESPN2 | No. 21 | Hofstra | W 89–68 | 7–3 | 28 – Filipowski | 12 – Filipowski | 8 – Filipowski | Cameron Indoor Stadium (9,314); Durham, NC |
| December 20, 2023*; 7:00 p.m., ESPN | No. 21 | vs. No. 10 Baylor; SentinelOne Classic | W 78–70 | 8–3 | 21 – McCain | 10 – Filipowski | 4 – Filipowski | Madison Square Garden (18,512); New York, NY |
| December 30, 2023*; 2:15 p.m., The CW | No. 16 | Queens (NC) | W 106–69 | 9–3 | 24 – McCain | 8 – Mitchell | 4 – Tied | Cameron Indoor Stadium (9,314); Durham, NC |
| January 2, 2024; 9:00 p.m., ESPN | No. 14 | Syracuse | W 86–66 | 10–3 (1–1) | 21 – Mitchell | 7 – Filipowski | 4 – Proctor | Cameron Indoor Stadium (9,314); Durham, NC |
| January 6, 2024; 6:00 p.m., ACCN | No. 14 | at Notre Dame | W 67–59 | 11–3 (2–1) | 23 – Mitchell | 14 – Mitchell | 4 – Filipowski | Joyce Center (8,066); South Bend, IN |
| January 9, 2024; 9:00 p.m., ESPN | No. 11т | at Pittsburgh | W 75–53 | 12–3 (3–1) | 26 – Filipowski | 10 – Filipowski | 7 – Foster | Petersen Events Center (11,476); Pittsburgh, PA |
| January 13, 2024; 5:00 p.m., ACCN | No. 11т | Georgia Tech | W 84–79 | 13–3 (4–1) | 30 – Filipowski | 13 – Filipowski | 4 – Tied | Cameron Indoor Stadium (9,314); Durham, NC |
| January 20, 2024; 8:00 p.m., ACCN | No. 7 | Pittsburgh | L 76–80 | 13–4 (4–2) | 20 – McCain | 6 – Foster | 5 – Foster | Cameron Indoor Stadium (9,314); Durham, NC |
| January 23, 2024; 7:00 p.m., ACCN | No. 12 | at Louisville | W 83–69 | 14–4 (5–2) | 24 – Proctor | 15 – Filipowski | 5 – Filipowski | KFC Yum! Center (12,620); Louisville, KY |
| January 27, 2024; 4:00 p.m., ESPN | No. 12 | Clemson | W 72–71 | 15–4 (6–2) | 21 – McCain | 6 – Mitchell | 4 – Tied | Cameron Indoor Stadium (9,314); Durham, NC |
| January 29, 2024; 7:00 p.m., ESPN | No. 7 | at Virginia Tech | W 77–67 | 16–4 (7–2) | 16 – Roach | 10 – McCain | 5 – Proctor | Cassell Coliseum (8,925); Blacksburg, VA |
| February 3, 2024; 6:30 p.m., ESPN | No. 7 | at No. 3 North Carolina; College GameDay/Rivalry | L 84–93 | 16–5 (7–3) | 23 – McCain | 11 – McCain | 2 – Tied | Dean Smith Center (21,750); Chapel Hill, NC |
| February 7, 2024; 9:00 p.m., ACCN | No. 9 | Notre Dame | W 71–53 | 17–5 (8–3) | 13 – Tied | 10 – Mitchell | 3 – Filipowski | Cameron Indoor Stadium (9,314); Durham, NC |
| February 10, 2024; 2:00 p.m., ESPN | No. 9 | Boston College | W 80–65 | 18–5 (9–3) | 17 – Mitchell | 10 – McCain | 5 – McCain | Cameron Indoor Stadium (9,314); Durham, NC |
| February 12, 2024; 7:00 p.m., ESPN | No. 9 | Wake Forest | W 77–69 | 19–5 (10–3) | 23 – Mitchell | 10 – Tied | 5 – Roach | Cameron Indoor Stadium (9,314); Durham, NC |
| February 17, 2024; 2:00 p.m., ESPN | No. 9 | at Florida State | W 76–67 | 20–5 (11–3) | 35 – McCain | 8 – Filipowski | 4 – Roach | Donald L. Tucker Civic Center (11,500); Tallahassee, FL |
| February 21, 2024; 7:00 p.m., ESPN | No. 8 | at Miami (FL) | W 84–55 | 21–5 (12–3) | 16 – Roach | 9 – Young | 5 – Proctor | Watsco Center (7,972); Coral Gables, FL |
| February 24, 2024; 2:00 p.m., ESPN | No. 8 | at Wake Forest | L 79–83 | 21–6 (12–4) | 17 – Filipowski | 8 – Filipowski | 5 – Filipowski | LJVM Coliseum (14,744); Winston-Salem, NC |
| February 28, 2024; 7:00 p.m., ACCN | No. 10 | Louisville | W 84–59 | 22–6 (13–4) | 19 – Roach | 10 – Filipowski | 7 – Proctor | Cameron Indoor Stadium (9,314); Durham, NC |
| March 2, 2024; 6:00 p.m., ESPN | No. 10 | Virginia | W 73–48 | 23–6 (14–4) | 21 – Filipowski | 8 – Stewart | 5 – Tied | Cameron Indoor Stadium (9,314); Durham, NC |
| March 4, 2024; 7:00 p.m., ESPN | No. 9 | at NC State | W 79–64 | 24–6 (15–4) | 21 – Roach | 6 – Mitchell | 4 – Proctor | PNC Arena (19,500); Raleigh, NC |
| March 9, 2024; 6:30 p.m., ESPN | No. 9 | No. 7 North Carolina; Rivalry | L 79–84 | 24–7 (15–5) | 23 – Filipowski | 7 – Tied | 3 – Tied | Cameron Indoor Stadium (9,314); Durham, NC |
ACC tournament
| March 14, 2024; 7:00 p.m., ESPN | (2) No. 11 | vs. (10) NC State; Quarterfinals | L 69–74 | 24–8 | 28 – Filipowski | 14 – Filipowski | 5 – Proctor | Capital One Arena (17,627); Washington, D.C. |
NCAA tournament
| March 22, 2024; 7:10 p.m., CBS | (4 S) No. 13 | vs. (13 S) Vermont; First Round | W 64–47 | 25–8 | 15 – Tied | 12 – Filipowski | 4 – Tied | Barclays Center (17,487); Brooklyn, NY |
| March 24, 2024; 5:15 p.m., CBS | (4 S) No. 13 | vs. (12 S) James Madison; Second Round | W 93–55 | 26–8 | 30 – McCain | 6 – Tied | 6 – Roach | Barclays Center (17,505); Brooklyn, NY |
| March 29, 2024; 9:39 p.m., CBS | (4 S) No. 13 | vs. (1 S) No. 2 Houston; Sweet Sixteen | W 54–51 | 27–8 | 16 – Filipowski | 9 – Filipowski | 4 – Tied | American Airlines Center (18,751); Dallas, TX |
| March 31, 2024; 5:05 p.m., CBS | (4 S) No. 13 | vs. (11 S) NC State; Elite Eight | L 64–76 | 27–9 | 32 – McCain | 9 – Filipowski | 4 – Proctor | American Airlines Center (16,969); Dallas, TX |
*Non-conference game. ^{#}Rankings from AP Poll. (#) Tournament seedings in parentheses. S=South. All times are in Eastern Time.

== Rankings ==
Ranking movements Legend: ██ Increase in ranking ██ Decrease in ranking т = Tied with team above or below ( ) = First-place votes
| | Week | | | | | | | | | | | | | | | | | | | | |
| Poll | Pre | 1 | 2 | 3 | 4 | 5 | 6 | 7 | 8 | 9 | 10 | 11 | 12 | 13 | 14 | 15 | 16 | 17 | 18 | 19 | Final |
|---|---|---|---|---|---|---|---|---|---|---|---|---|---|---|---|---|---|---|---|---|---|
| AP | 2 (11) | 9 | 9 | 7 | 22 | 21 | 21 | 16 | 14 | 11т | 7 | 12 | 7 | 9 | 9 | 8 | 10 | 9 | 11 | 13 | 9 |
| Coaches | 3 (3) | 9 | 9 | 7 | 21 | 19 | 19 | 15 | 13 | 11 | 6 | 12 | 7 | 10 | 8 | 7 | 10 | 8 | 11 | 14 | 9 |
