= Tyrese Proctor =

Australian basketball player (born 2004)

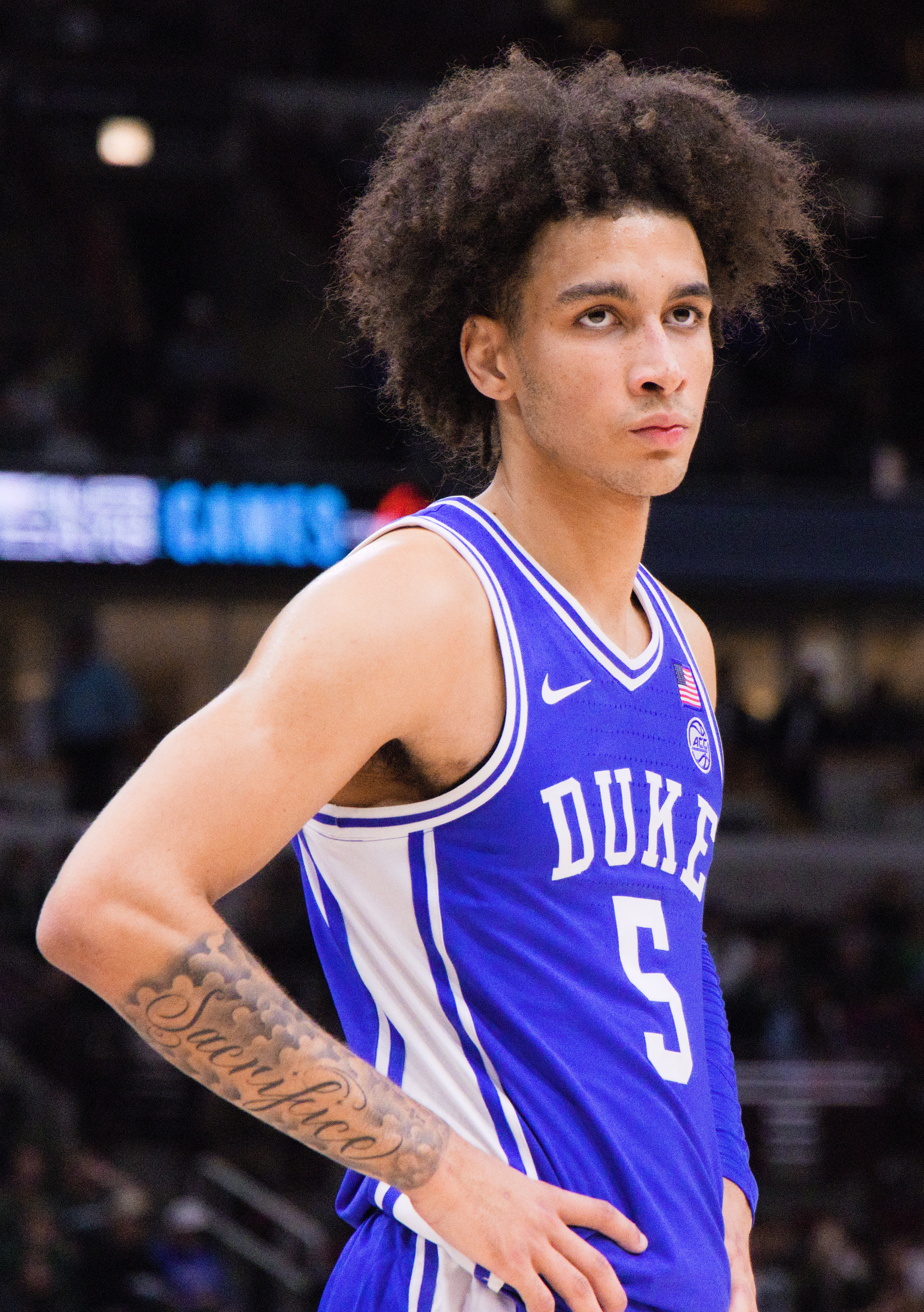
- Proctor with Duke in 2023

No. 24 – Cleveland Cavaliers
- Position: Point guard / shooting guard
- League: NBA

Personal information
- Born: 1 April 2004 (age 22) Sydney, New South Wales, Australia
- Listed height: 6 ft 4 in (1.93 m)
- Listed weight: 185 lb (84 kg)

Career information
- High school: Trinity Grammar School (Sydney, NSW); Lake Ginninderra (Canberra, ACT)
- College: Duke (2022–2025)
- NBA draft: 2025: 2nd round, 49th overall pick
- Drafted by: Cleveland Cavaliers
- Playing career: 2021–present

Career history
- 2021–2022: BA Centre of Excellence
- 2025–present: Cleveland Cavaliers
- 2026: →Cleveland Charge

Career highlights
- Third-team All-ACC (2025); ACC All-Freshman team (2023)
- Stats at NBA.com
- Stats at Basketball Reference
Medals
Men's basketball
Representing Australia
FIBA Asia Cup
Gold medal – first place	2022 Jakarta

Tyrese Darnell Proctor (born 1 April 2004) is an Australian professional basketball player for the Cleveland Cavaliers of the National Basketball Association (NBA). He played college basketball for the Duke Blue Devils and was drafted with the 49th overall pick in the 2025 NBA draft by the Cleveland Cavaliers.

== Early life and career ==
Proctor was born in Sydney, New South Wales, to an Australian mother and an American-born father. His father, Rod, is a former professional basketball player for the Sydney Kings in Australia's National Basketball League. Proctor attended Bangor Public School throughout his upbringing and grew up playing an array of sports such as cricket, soccer and baseball but basketball was his highest priority. He began playing junior basketball for the Sutherland Sharks and represented his home state of New South Wales at numerous national championships.

In 2021, Proctor received a scholarship to attend the NBA Global Academy in Canberra. He played for the BA Centre of Excellence in the Waratah League in 2021, averaging 10.3 points, 3.1 rebounds and 1.4 assists in seven games. The following year, he played for the Centre of Excellence in the NBL1 during the 2022 season, averaging 15.7 points, 3.3 rebounds, 3.3 assists and 1.7 steals per game.

While in Canberra, Proctor attended Lake Ginninderra College.

== College career ==
In April 2022, Proctor committed to join the Duke Blue Devils. He averaged 9.4 points and 3.3 assists per game as a freshman in the 2022–23 season, shooting 38.1% from the field. Proctor was named to the ACC All-Freshman Team.

As a sophomore in 2023–24, Proctor played 32 games and averaged 10.5 points, three rebounds, and 3.7 assists per game.

As a junior in 2024–25, Proctor played 38 games and averaged 12.4 points, three rebounds, and 2.2 assists per game.

In April 2025, Proctor declared for the NBA draft.

== Professional career ==
On 26 June 2025, Proctor was selected by the Cleveland Cavaliers with the 49th overall pick in the 2025 NBA draft. On 1 July 2025, he signed a four-year, $8.69 million deal with the Cavaliers. The first two years were fully guaranteed, with a partially guaranteed third year, and a team option on the fourth year. On 3 March 2026, he was assigned to the Cleveland Charge of the NBA G League. He appeared in a game for the Charge that day before recalled to the Cavaliers immediately after. On 12 April, in the Cavaliers' regular season-finale, Proctor recorded 22 points, 11 rebounds and eight assists in a 130–117 win over the Washington Wizards.

On 14 November 2026, Proctor put up his first career triple-double, posting up 24 points, 11 rebounds and a career-high ten assists in a 127–117 win against the Dallas Mavericks.

== National team career ==
In February 2021, Proctor made his debut with the senior Australia national team at the age of 16, in a 2022 FIBA Asia Cup qualifier against New Zealand. In July 2022, he returned to play for Australia in their 2023 FIBA World Cup qualifying win against China. Later that month, he was selected to represent Australia at the 2022 FIBA Asia Cup in Indonesia, where he played a starring role in Australia's run to win the gold medal.

In June 2026, Proctor was named in the Boomers squad for the next window of the FIBA Basketball World Cup 2027 Asian Qualifiers in Perth in July.

== Career statistics ==
Legend
GP	Games played	GS	Games started	MPG	Minutes per game
FG%	Field goal percentage	3P%	3-point field goal percentage	FT%	Free throw percentage
RPG	Rebounds per game	APG	Assists per game	SPG	Steals per game
BPG	Blocks per game	PPG	Points per game	**Bold**	Career high

=== NBA ===
==== Regular season ====
Year	Team	GP	GS	MPG	FG%	3P%	FT%	RPG	APG	SPG	BPG	PPG
2025–26	Cleveland	50	1	10.9	.413	.351	.889	1.3	1.5	.5	.0	5.4
Career		50	1	10.9	.413	.351	.889	1.3	1.5	.5	.0	5.4

==== Playoffs ====
Year	Team	GP	GS	MPG	FG%	3P%	FT%	RPG	APG	SPG	BPG	PPG
2026	Cleveland	4	0	3.3	.000	.000	1.000	.3	.5	.0	.0	.5
Career		4	0	3.3	.000	.000	1.000	.3	.5	.0	.0	.5

=== College ===
Year	Team	GP	GS	MPG	FG%	3P%	FT%	RPG	APG	SPG	BPG	PPG
2022–23	Duke	36	34	29.4	.381	.320	**.871**	**3.1**	3.3	.6	**.1**	9.4
2023–24	Duke	32	25	**30.4**	.423	.352	.755	3.0	**3.7**	.7	**.1**	10.5
2024–25	Duke	**38**	**38**	29.9	**.452**	**.405**	.680	3.0	2.2	**.8**	**.1**	**12.4**
Career		106	97	29.9	.421	.365	.768	3.0	3.0	.7	.1	10.8
