= 2023–24 Pittsburgh Panthers men's basketball team =

American college basketball season

2023–24 Pittsburgh Panthers men's basketball
- Conference: Atlantic Coast Conference
- Record: 22–11 (12–8 ACC)
- Head coach: Jeff Capel (6th season)
- Associate head coach: Tim O'Toole (6th season)
- Assistant coaches: Milan Brown (6th season); Jason Capel (6th season)
- Home arena: Petersen Events Center (Capacity: 12,508)

2023–24 ACC men's basketball standings
	Conf.				Overall
Team	W		L	PCT	W		L	PCT
No. 7 North Carolina	17	–	3	.850	29	–	8	.784
No. 9 Duke	15	–	5	.750	27	–	9	.750
Virginia	13	–	7	.650	23	–	11	.676
Pittsburgh	12	–	8	.600	22	–	11	.667
Wake Forest	11	–	9	.550	21	–	14	.600
No. 14 Clemson	11	–	9	.550	24	–	12	.667
Syracuse	11	–	9	.550	20	–	12	.625
Virginia Tech	10	–	10	.500	19	–	15	.559
Florida State	10	–	10	.500	17	–	16	.515
No. 10 NC State †	9	–	11	.450	26	–	15	.634
Boston College	8	–	12	.400	20	–	16	.556
Notre Dame	7	–	13	.350	13	–	20	.394
Georgia Tech	7	–	13	.350	14	–	18	.438
Miami (FL)	6	–	14	.300	15	–	17	.469
Louisville	3	–	17	.150	8	–	24	.250
† 2024 ACC tournament winner Rankings from AP Poll

The 2023–24 Pittsburgh Panthers men's basketball team represented the University of Pittsburgh during the 2023–24 NCAA Division I men's basketball season. The Panthers were led by sixth-year head coach Jeff Capel and played their home games at the Petersen Events Center in Pittsburgh, Pennsylvania as members of the Atlantic Coast Conference.

The Panthers won their first four games of the season before losing the opening game of their preseason tournament, the NIT Season Tip-Off, to Florida. They won the third place game against Oregon State. They would then go on to lose their next two games, the first to Missouri in the ACC–SEC Challenge and their ACC season opener against Clemson. They then rebounded to win their next four games, including a rivalry game against West Virginia. The Panthers had a record of 9–2 against non-conference opponents. The Panthers lost four of their next five ACC games including to eighth-ranked North Carolina and eleventh-ranked Duke. Pittsburgh began a streak of winning seven of their next eight with a win over seventh-ranked Duke. The only loss during the stretch came at Miami (FL) while they won against NC State and twenty first-ranked Virginia. They finished the season by winning four of their last six games, with losses coming again to Clemson and to Wake Forest. They defeated NC State on the final day of the season.

The Panthers finished the 2023–24 season 22–11 and 12–8 in ACC play to finish in a fourth place. As the fourth seed in the ACC tournament they received a bye into the Quarterfinals where they defeated Wake Forest. They faced North Carolina in the Semifinals where they were defeated 65–72. They were not invited to the NCAA tournament and they were eligible to participate in the NIT Tournament, but they opted not to participate.

== Previous season ==
The Panthers finished the 2022–23 season 24–12, 14–6 in ACC play to finish in a three-way tie for third place. This season marked a surprise turnaround from previous seasons; at one point, the Panthers were ranked No. 25 in the nation, their first appearance in the top-25 rankings in seven years. As the No. 5 seed in the ACC tournament, they defeated Georgia Tech before losing to Duke in the quarterfinals. They received an at-large bid to the NCAA tournament, the Panthers' first invitation since 2016. As a No. 11 seed in the Midwest region, they defeated Mississippi State in the First Four. They upset Iowa State in the first round before losing to Xavier in the second round. This marked Pitt's best season since 2014.

== Offseason ==
=== Departures ===
Departures
Name	Number	Pos.	Height	Weight	Year	Hometown	Reason for Departure
Nelly Cummings	0	G	6'0"	190	GS Senior	Midland, PA	Graduated/signed to play professionally in Cyprus with AEL Limassol B.C.
Dior Johnson	1	G	6'3"	185	Freshman	Kingston, NY	Left the team for personal reasons
Greg Elliott	3	G	6'3"	180	GS Senior	Detroit, MI	Graduated
John Hugley	4	F	6'9"	265	Junior	Cleveland, OH	Transferred to Oklahoma
Nate Santos	5	F	6'7"	215	Sophomore	Geneva, IL	Transferred to Dayton
Jamarius Burton	11	G	6'4"	200	(redshirt) Senior	Charlotte, NC	Graduated/signed to play professionally in Belgium with Kortrijk Spurs
Aidan Fisch	13	F	6'5"	185	Senior	Murrysville, PA	Walk-on; graduated
Nike Sibande	22	G	6'4"	185	(redshirt) Senior	Indianapolis, IN	Graduated

=== Incoming transfers ===
Incoming transfers
Name	Number	Pos.	Height	Weight	Year	Hometown	Previous School
Ishmael Leggett	5	G	6'2"	180	(redshirt) Junior	Washington, D.C.	Rhode Island
KJ Marshall	12	G	5'10"	180	Senior	Reading, PA	Walk-on; Mars Hill
Zack Austin	55	F	6'7"	201	(redshirt) Junior	Winston-Salem, NC	High Point

=== Recruiting classes ===
==== 2023 recruiting class ====
College recruiting information
Name	Hometown	School	Height	Weight	Commit date
Jaland Lowe #15 PG	Houston, TX	Marshall High School	6 ft 1 in (1.85 m)	160 lb (73 kg)	Oct 2, 2022
Jaland Lowe #15 PG	Recruit ratings: Rivals: 247Sports: ESPN: (81)				
Papa Kante #24 C	South Kent, CT	South Kent School	6 ft 9 in (2.06 m)	215 lb (98 kg)	May 22, 2023
Papa Kante #24 C	Recruit ratings: Rivals: 247Sports: ESPN: (81)				
Bub Carrington #33 SG	Baltimore, MD	St. Frances Academy	6 ft 3 in (1.91 m)	180 lb (82 kg)	Jun 15, 2022
Bub Carrington #33 SG	Recruit ratings: Rivals: 247Sports: ESPN: (81)				
Marlon Barnes Jr. #33 SG	Lyndhurst, OH	Brush High School	6 ft 4 in (1.93 m)	175 lb (79 kg)	Jan 19, 2022
Marlon Barnes Jr. #33 SG	Recruit ratings: Rivals: 247Sports: ESPN: (79)				
Overall recruit ranking: Scout: 27 Rivals: 22
Note: In many cases, Scout, Rivals, 247Sports, On3, and ESPN may conflict in their listings of height and weight.; In these cases, the average was taken. ESPN grades are on a 100-point scale.; Sources: "Pittsburgh Panthers". ESPN.; "2023 Team Ranking". Rivals.

==== 2024 recruiting class ====
College recruiting information (2024)
Name	Hometown	School	Height	Weight	Commit date
Brandin Cummings #30 SG	Midland, PA	Lincoln Park High School	6 ft 2 in (1.88 m)	170 lb (77 kg)	Jan 4, 2023
Brandin Cummings #30 SG	Recruit ratings: Rivals: 247Sports: ESPN: (81)				
Overall recruit ranking: Scout: 27 Rivals: 22
Note: In many cases, Scout, Rivals, 247Sports, On3, and ESPN may conflict in their listings of height and weight.; In these cases, the average was taken. ESPN grades are on a 100-point scale.; Sources: "Pittsburgh Panthers". ESPN.; "2024 Team Ranking". Rivals.

== Roster ==
2023–24 Pittsburgh Panthers men's basketball team
Players
Coaches

Pos.	#	Name	Height	Weight	Year	Previous school	Hometown
G/F	2	Blake Hinson	6 ft 7 in (2.01 m)	235 lb (107 kg)	RS Sr	Sunrise Christian Academy; Iowa State	Deltona, FL
F	4	Papa Amadou Kante	6 ft 10 in (2.08 m)	215 lb (98 kg)	Fr	South Kent Prep	Dakar, Senegal
G	5	Ishmael Leggett	6 ft 3 in (1.91 m)	195 lb (88 kg)	RS Jr	St. John's College; Rhode Island	Washington, D.C.
G	7	Bub Carrington	6 ft 4 in (1.93 m)	180 lb (82 kg)	Fr	St. Frances Academy	Baltimore, MD
F	11	Marlon Barnes Jr.	6 ft 6 in (1.98 m)	180 lb (82 kg)	Fr	Brush	Cleveland, OH
G	12	KJ Marshall (W)	5 ft 10 in (1.78 m)	175 lb (79 kg)	Sr	Trinity Christian Academy; Mars Hill	Reading, PA
G	13	Benjamin Mayhew (W)	6 ft 4 in (1.93 m)	180 lb (82 kg)	Fr	Propel Braddock Hills	Wilkinsburg, PA
G	15	Jaland Lowe	6 ft 2 in (1.88 m)	170 lb (77 kg)	Fr	Fort Bend Marshall	Missouri City, TX
G	21	Vason Stevenson (W)	6 ft 3 in (1.91 m)	190 lb (86 kg)	So	Montour	McKees Rocks, PA
F	24	William Jeffress	6 ft 7 in (2.01 m)	205 lb (93 kg)	RS Jr	McDowell HS	Erie, PA
F	25	Guillermo Díaz Graham	7 ft 0 in (2.13 m)	205 lb (93 kg)	So	IMG Academy	Canary Islands, Spain
F	31	Jorge Díaz Graham	6 ft 11 in (2.11 m)	190 lb (86 kg)	So	IMG Academy	Canary Islands, Spain
C	33	Federiko Federiko	6 ft 11 in (2.11 m)	220 lb (100 kg)	Jr	First Love Christian Academy (PA); Northern Oklahoma	Helsinki, Finland
F	44	Jajuan Nelson (W)	6 ft 7 in (2.01 m)	215 lb (98 kg)	Fr	String Theory Charter (PA)	Philadelphia, PA
F	55	Zack Austin	6 ft 6 in (1.98 m)	205 lb (93 kg)	RS Jr	Moravian Prep; High Point	Winston-Salem, NC

Head coach

- Jeff Capel (Duke)

Assistant coach(es)

- Tim O'Toole (Fairfield)
- Milan Brown (Howard)
- Jason Capel (North Carolina)

Legend

- (C) Team captain
- (S) Suspended
- (I) Ineligible
- (W) Walk-on
- Injured
- Current redshirt

Roster

== Schedule and results ==
Date time, TV	Rank^{#}	Opponent^{#}	Result	Record	High points	High rebounds	High assists	Site (attendance) city, state
Exhibition
November 1, 2023*; 7:00 p.m.		Pitt-Johnstown	W 96–60	–	13 – Tied	8 – Tied	6 – Carrington	Petersen Events Center (–); Pittsburgh, PA
Regular season
November 6, 2023*; 7:00 p.m., ACCNX/ESPN+		North Carolina A&T	W 100–52	1–0	18 – Carrington	12 – Carrington	10 – Carrington	Petersen Events Center (6,797); Pittsburgh, PA
November 10, 2023*; 7:00 p.m., ACCNX/ESPN+		Binghamton	W 89–60	2–0	26 – Hinson	11 – Leggett	5 – Leggett	Petersen Events Center (7,747); Pittsburgh, PA
November 13, 2023*; 7:00 p.m., ACCN		Florida Gulf Coast	W 86–74	3–0	19 – Carrington	7 – Tied	7 – Carrington	Petersen Events Center (6,567); Pittsburgh, PA
November 17, 2023*; 7:00 p.m., ACCNX/ESPN+		Jacksonville	W 107–56	4–0	25 – Hinson	10 – G. Diaz Graham	6 – Lowe	Petersen Events Center (7,842); Pittsburgh, PA
November 22, 2023*; 9:30 p.m., ESPN2		vs. Florida; NIT Season Tip-Off semifinals	L 71–86	4–1	19 – Leggett	9 – Tied	7 – Carrington	Barclays Center (1,873); Brooklyn, NY
November 24, 2023*; 3:00 p.m., ESPN2		vs. Oregon State; NIT Season Tip-Off 3rd place game	W 76–51	5–1	19 – Austin	8 – Austin	5 – Carrington	Barclays Center (1,620); Brooklyn, NY
November 28, 2023*; 7:30 p.m., ESPNU		Missouri; ACC–SEC Challenge	L 64–71	5–2	22 – Hinson	7 – Tied	4 – Carrington	Petersen Events Center (7,390); Pittsburgh, PA
December 3, 2023; 2:00 p.m., ACCN		Clemson	L 70–79	5–3 (0–1)	27 – Hinson	7 – Austin	6 – Carrington	Petersen Events Center (7,713); Pittsburgh, PA
December 6, 2023*; 9:00 p.m., ESPN2		at West Virginia; Backyard Brawl	W 80–63	6–3	29 – Hinson	9 – Jeffress	9 – Carrington	WVU Coliseum (12,301); Morgantown, WV
December 9, 2023*; 6:00 p.m., ACCN		Canisius	W 82–71	7–3	26 – Hinson	5 – Tied	5 – Tied	Petersen Events Center (7,808); Pittsburgh, PA
December 16, 2023*; 2:00 p.m., ACCN		South Carolina State	W 86–50	8–3	19 – Hinson	8 – G. Diaz Graham	6 – Lowe	Petersen Events Center (8,370); Pittsburgh, PA
December 20, 2023*; 7:00 p.m., ACCNX/ESPN+		Purdue Fort Wayne	W 62–48	9–3	13 – G. Diaz Graham	10 – Hinson	3 – Tied	Petersen Events Center (7,641); Pittsburgh, PA
December 30, 2023; 12:00 p.m., The CW		at Syracuse	L 73–81	9–4 (0–2)	17 – Carrington	10 – Jeffress	5 – Carrington	JMA Wireless Dome (20,642); Syracuse, NY
January 2, 2024; 7:00 p.m., ESPN		No. 8 North Carolina	L 57–70	9–5 (0–3)	20 – Carrington	8 – Leggett	2 – Tied	Petersen Events Center (9,770); Pittsburgh, PA
January 6, 2024; 12:00 p.m., The CW		at Louisville	W 83–70	10–5 (1–3)	21 – Hinson	6 – Tied	5 – Carrington	KFC Yum! Center (10,883); Louisville, KY
January 9, 2024; 9:00 p.m., ESPN		No. 11т Duke	L 53–75	10–6 (1–4)	11 – Austin	8 – G. Diaz Graham	3 – Federiko	Petersen Events Center (11,476); Pittsburgh, PA
January 16, 2024; 7:00 p.m., ESPN		Syracuse	L 58–69	10–7 (1–5)	20 – Lowe	8 – Hinson	3 – Lowe	Petersen Events Center (7,708); Pittsburgh, PA
January 20, 2024; 8:00 p.m., ACCN		at No. 7 Duke	W 80–76	11–7 (2–5)	24 – Hinson	8 – Hinson	6 – Lowe	Cameron Indoor Stadium (9,314); Durham, NC
January 23, 2024; 7:00 p.m., ESPNU		at Georgia Tech	W 72–64	12–7 (3–5)	19 – Carrington	7 – Federiko	4 – Austin	McCamish Pavilion (3,612); Atlanta, GA
January 27, 2024; 2:15 p.m., The CW		at Miami (FL)	L 68–72	12–8 (3–6)	21 – Hinson	9 – Hinson	4 – Tied	Watsco Center (7,779); Coral Gables, FL
January 31, 2024; 7:00 p.m., ACCN		Wake Forest	W 77–72	13–8 (4–6)	24 – Carrington	7 – Federiko	4 – Carrington	Petersen Events Center (7,769); Pittsburgh, PA
February 3, 2024; 6:00 p.m., ACCN		Notre Dame	W 70–60	14–8 (5–6)	17 – Hinson	9 – Federiko	5 – Lowe	Petersen Events Center (10,864); Pittsburgh, PA
February 7, 2024; 7:00 p.m., ESPNU		at NC State	W 67–64	15–8 (6–6)	20 – Lowe	10 – Federiko	3 – Carrington	PNC Arena (11,366); Raleigh, NC
February 13, 2024; 7:00 p.m., ACCN		at No. 21 Virginia	W 74–63	16–8 (7–6)	27 – Hinson	9 – Leggett	6 – Carrington	John Paul Jones Arena (13,858); Charlottesville, VA
February 17, 2024; 6:30 p.m., ACCN		Louisville	W 86–59	17–8 (8–6)	41 – Hinson	8 – Federiko	8 – Carrington	Petersen Events Center (11,419); Pittsburgh, PA
February 20, 2024; 9:00 p.m., ACCN		at Wake Forest	L 58–91	17–9 (8–7)	15 – Leggett	8 – G. Diaz Graham	4 – Lowe	LJVM Coliseum (7,448); Winston-Salem, NC
February 24, 2024; 5:30 p.m., The CW		Virginia Tech	W 79–64	18–9 (9–7)	22 – Hinson	14 – Austin	6 – Lowe	Petersen Events Center (12,094); Pittsburgh, PA
February 27, 2024; 7:00 p.m., ACCN		at Clemson	L 62–69	18–10 (9–8)	18 – Carrington	7 – Carrington	3 – Carrington	Littlejohn Coliseum (7,346); Clemson, SC
March 2, 2024; 6:00 p.m., ACCN		at Boston College	W 90–65	19–10 (10–8)	27 – Carrington	7 – Leggett	9 – Lowe	Conte Forum (7,536); Chestnut Hill, MA
March 5, 2024; 9:00 p.m., ESPN2		Florida State	W 88–73	20–10 (11–8)	27 – Hinson	6 – Carrington	10 – Lowe	Petersen Events Center (7,860); Pittsburgh, PA
March 9, 2024; 7:45 p.m., The CW		NC State	W 81–73	21–10 (12–8)	23 – Carrington	9 – Federiko	6 – Carrington	Petersen Events Center (10,700); Pittsburgh, PA
ACC Tournament
March 14, 2024; 2:30 p.m., ESPN2	(4)	vs. (5) Wake Forest; Quarterfinals	W 81–69	22–10	30 – Leggett	8 – Leggett	5 – Lowe	Capital One Arena (14,920); Washington, D.C.
March 15, 2024; 7:00 p.m., ESPN	(4)	vs. (1) No. 4 North Carolina; Semifinals	L 65–72	22–11	24 – Carrington	8 – G. Diaz Graham	4 – Lowe	Capital One Arena (18,722); Washington, D.C.
*Non-conference game. ^{#}Rankings from AP Poll. (#) Tournament seedings in parentheses. All times are in Eastern Time.

== Rankings ==
Ranking movements Legend: ██ Increase in ranking ██ Decrease in ranking — = Not ranked RV = Received votes
	Week																				
Poll	Pre	1	2	3	4	5	6	7	8	9	10	11	12	13	14	15	16	17	18	19	Final
AP	—	—	—	—	—	—	—	—	—	—	—	—	—	—	—	RV	—	—	—	—	—
Coaches	—	—	—	—	—	—	—	—	—	—	—	—	—	—	—	—	—	—	—	RV	—

*AP does not release post-NCAA tournament rankings
^Coaches did not release a Week 2 poll.
