= 2026–27 Virtus Bologna season =

Basketball team season

Virtus Bologna
2026–27 season
- Owner: Massimo Zanetti
- President: Massimo Zanetti
- Head coach: Álex Mumbrú
- Arena: Unipol Hall

The 2026–27 season is Virtus Bologna's 98th in existence and the club's 10th consecutive season in the top flight of Italian basketball.

== Kit ==
Supplier: Adidas / Sponsor: Costa Cruises

Home	Away

== Players ==
=== Current roster ===
Virtus Bologna roster
Players
Coaches

Pos.	No.	Nat.	Name	Ht.	Wt.	Age
PG	0	(United States)	Bello, Rasheed	1.83 m (6 ft 0 in)	83 kg (183 lb)	23 – 21 July 2003
G	1	(Puerto Rico)	Frazier, Trent	1.87 m (6 ft 2 in)	70 kg (154 lb)	28 – 8 September 1998
PG	2	(Canada)	Carr, Marcus	1.88 m (6 ft 2 in)	86 kg (190 lb)	27 – 6 June 1999
F/C	3	(Angola)	Kokila, Kevin (L)	2.03 m (6 ft 8 in)	110 kg (243 lb)	25 – 3 September 2001
G/F	7	(Italy)	Casarin, Davide (injured)	1.96 m (6 ft 5 in)	86 kg (190 lb)	23 – 22 May 2003
G/F	8	(United States)	Moore Jr., Wendell	1.96 m (6 ft 5 in)	98 kg (216 lb)	25 – 18 September 2001
F	9	(United States)	Edwards, Kessler	2.01 m (6 ft 7 in)	92 kg (203 lb)	26 – 9 August 2000
G	11	(Italy)	Baldasso, Tommaso	1.92 m (6 ft 4 in)	80 kg (176 lb)	28 – 29 January 1998
G/F	13	(Italy)	Baiocchi, Matteo (Y)	1.96 m (6 ft 5 in)	91 kg (201 lb)	19 – 2 August 2007
PF	21	(United States)	Alston Jr., Derrick	2.06 m (6 ft 9 in)	86 kg (190 lb)	29 – 17 September 1997
PG	22	(Italy)	Lonati, Achille (Y)	1.95 m (6 ft 5 in)	90 kg (198 lb)	19 – 22 January 2007
G	23	(Italy)	Hackett, Daniel (C)	1.96 m (6 ft 5 in)	97 kg (214 lb)	38 – 19 December 1987
F	24	(Italy)	Ferrari, Francesco	2.04 m (6 ft 8 in)	90 kg (198 lb)	21 – 18 August 2005
C	31	(Mali)	Diarra, Aliou	2.08 m (6 ft 10 in)	95 kg (209 lb)	24 – 31 December 2001
PF	34	(Sweden)	Klintman, Bobi	2.06 m (6 ft 9 in)	102 kg (225 lb)	23 – 6 March 2003
C	35	(Italy)	Diouf, Mouhamet	2.08 m (6 ft 10 in)	108 kg (238 lb)	25 – 10 September 2001
SF	50	(Italy)	Abass, Awudu	1.98 m (6 ft 6 in)	100 kg (220 lb)	33 – 27 January 1993

Head coach

- (Spain) Álex Mumbrú

Assistant coach(es)

- (Italy) Daniele Parente
- (Spain) Jorge Àlvarez Sierra
- (Italy) Cristian Fedrigo
- (Italy) Roberto Bellini
- (Italy) Samuele Mongardi

Athletic trainer(s)

- (Italy) Emanuele Tibiletti

Legend

- (C) Team captain
- (IN) Inactive
- (L) On loan
- (Y) Youth player
- Injured

- Roster
Updated: November 20, 2026

Note: Flags indicate national team eligibility at FIBA-sanctioned events. Players may hold other non-FIBA nationalities not displayed.

=== Players out on loan ===
Players out on loan
Nat.	Player	Position	Team	On loan since	Source
(Italy)	Matteo Accorsi	PG	(Italy) Victoria Libertas	24 July 2026	

=== Depth chart ===
Pos.	Starting 5	Bench 1	Bench 2	Bench 3	Inactive
C	Mouhamet Diouf †	Aliou Diarra ^		Kevin Kokila °
PF	Francesco Ferrari †	Bobi Klintman °		Derrick Alston Jr. *
SF	Wendell Moore Jr. *	Awudu Abass †	Matteo Baiocchi ‡	Kessler Edwards *	Davide Casarin † (injured)
SG	Trent Frazier *	Tommaso Baldasso †
PG	Marcus Carr *	Rasheed Bello *	Daniel Hackett †	Achille Lonati ‡

Notes: LBA clubs can choose between two main roster composition and foreign player formulas:

- 5+5 Formula: 5 Italian players and 5 foreign players.
- 3+4+5 Formula: 5 Italian players, 3 non-EU (European Union) foreigners, and 4 EU foreigners (including countries from the Cotonou Agreement).

Blue † – Homegrown player; (Note: A homegrown player (known in Italy as an atleta di formazione italiana) is defined by where they received their basketball training, rather than their actual passport or nationality. To be officially classified as a homegrown player by the Italian Basketball Federation (FIP), an athlete must complete at least four seasons in an Italian club’s youth academy (between the ages of 14 and 21), appearing in a minimum of 14 games per season. In EuroLeague, the team did not have any limitations regarding the number of Homegrown players.) Red * – Non-EU foreign player; (Note: A non-EU foreigner is a player from a country with no special trade or labor agreement with the European Union. In professional basketball, this primarily applies to players from the United States, Canada, Australia, and parts of Asia or non-EU Europe who do not possess a secondary European passport.) Purple °; – EU Foreign player (Note: "EU Foreign" players: An EU foreign player is a player who holds citizenship in a European Union (EU) member state (or an associated territory) but is not a citizen of the country where the league is based. Minimum of 4 EU Foreign players must be included on the active roster using the 3+4+5 formula) Gold ^; – Cotonou Agreement player (Note: "Cotonou Agreement" players: A Cotonou Agreement player (often called a "Cotonou player") is a basketball player who holds a passport from one of the 79 African, Caribbean, or Pacific (ACP) nations that signed the Cotonou Agreement with the European Union. In the LBA, these athletes are treated exactly like EU citizens and do not count against strict non-EU import quotas. The Cotonou Agreement is a political and trade treaty originally signed in 2000. Following a legal precedent known as the Kolpak ruling, European courts determined that citizens of countries with trade agreements guaranteeing non-discrimination against workers must have the same right to free movement of labor as EU citizens. Because of this ruling, if an LBA club chooses the 3+4+5 team-building formula, Cotonou players can be signed to fill the 4 EU foreigner roster spots, leaving the team’s 3 non-EU spots completely open for American or other traditional import players.) Green ‡ – youth player (Note: "Youth" players: players who are under the age of 20. In the context of European basketball and the LBA, youth players act as a bridge for clubs to fill out their active game-day rosters while meeting domestic requirements. To satisfy the "Italian player" requirement in the 5+5 or 3+4+5 formulas, a player does not technically have to be born in Italy. They can qualify as "homegrown" (Italian-trained) if they spent at least three consecutive seasons in an Italian club's youth academy between the ages of 15 and 21.)

=== Squad changes for/during the 2026–27 season ===
==== In ====
No.	Pos.	Nat.	Name	Age	Moving from		Type	Contract	Ends	Transfer fee	Date	Source
0	PG	(United States)	Rasheed Bello	23	Antwerp Giants	(Belgium)	Transfer	multi-year	Undisclosed	Undisclosed	3 July 2026	
1	G	(Puerto Rico)	Trent Frazier	28	Zenit Saint Petersburg	(Russia)	Transfer	1 year	July 2027	Undisclosed	22 July 2026	
2	PG	(Canada)	Marcus Carr	27	Würzburg Baskets	(Germany)	Transfer	multi-year	Undisclosed	Undisclosed	6 July 2026	
3	F/C	(France) (Angola)	Kevin Kokila	25	Dubai Basketball	(United Arab Emirates)	Loan	1 year	July 2027	Undisclosed	5 August 2026	
7	G/F	(Italy)	Davide Casarin	23	Vanoli Cremona	(Italy)	Transfer	2 years	July 2028	Free	30 June 2026	
8	G/F	(United States)	Wendell Moore Jr.	25	Detroit Pistons	(United States)	Transfer	1 year	July 2027	Free	28 July 2026	
9	F	(United States)	Kessler Edwards	26	Hapoel Tel Aviv	(Israel)	Transfer	multi-year	Undisclosed	Undisclosed	10 July 2026	
11	G	(Italy)	Tommaso Baldasso	28	Derthona	(Italy)	Transfer	2 years	July 2028	Free	29 June 2026	
22	PG	(Italy)	Achille Lonati	19	St. Bonaventure Bonnies	(United States)	Transfer	3 years	July 2029	Free	18 November 2026	
34	PF	(Sweden)	Bobi Klintman	23	Detroit Pistons	(United States)	Transfer	1 year	July 2027	Free	2 July 2026	
50	SF	(Italy)	Awudu Abass	33	Dubai Basketball	(United Arab Emirates)	Transfer	1 year	July 2027	Free	20 November 2026	

==== Out ====
No.	Pos.	Nat.	Name	Age	Moving to		Type	Transfer fee	Date	Source
1	G	(Argentina)	Luca Vildoza	31	Paritzan Belgrade	(Serbia)	Parted ways	Free	26 July 2026	
3	SG	(United States)	Carsen Edwards	28	Žalgiris Kaunas	(Lithuania)	End of contract	Free	29 June 2026	
6	G	(Italy)	Alessandro Pajola	27	Partizan Belgrade	(Serbia)	End of contract	Free	1 July 2026	
7	F	(Senegal) (Italy)	Saliou Niang	22	LSU Tigers	(United States)	Transfer	$500,000	20 October 2026	
8	G	(Italy)	Matteo Accorsi	19	Victoria Libertas	(Italy)	Loan	Free	24 July 2026	
9	F/C	(Serbia)	Alen Smailagić	26	Galatasaray	(Turkey)	Parted ways	€300,000	6 August 2026	
30	G	(United States)	Matt Morgan	29	Aris Thessaloniki	(Greece)	End of contract	Undisclosed	8 July 2026	
34	F	(Germany) (The Gambia)	Karim Jallow	29	Derthona	(Italy)	End of contract	Free	8 July 2026	
45	PF	(Italy) (Democratic Republic of the Congo)	Nicola Akele	31	Olimpia Milano	(Italy)	End of contract	Free	1 July 2026	
99	PG	(Brazil)	Yago dos Santos	27	Flamengo	(Brazil)	End of contract	Free	19 June 2026	
