= 2019–20 Euroleague Basketball Next Generation Tournament =

ANGT
- Season: 2019–20
- Duration: 27 December 2019–24 May 2020
- Teams: 32

The 2019–20 Euroleague Basketball Next Generation Tournament, also called Adidas Next Generation Tournament by sponsorship reasons, was the 18th edition of the international junior basketball tournament organized by the Euroleague Basketball.

== Teams ==
As in past years, 32 under-18 teams from 14 countries joined the first stage, which played in four qualifying tournaments between December 2019 and February 2020.

(Spain) Casademont Zaragoza	(Germany) Bayern Munich	(Greece) Promitheas	(Turkey) Fenerbahçe Beko
(Spain) Barcelona	(Germany) Porsche Ludwigsburg	(Serbia) Crvena zvezda mts	(Turkey) Tofaş
(Spain) Herbalife Gran Canaria	(Germany) ratiopharm Ulm	(Serbia) Mega Bemax	(Croatia) Cibona
(Spain) Joventut	(France) CFBB Paris	(Serbia) Partizan NIS	(United Kingdom) Barking Abbey
(Spain) Real Madrid	(France) LDLC ASVEL	(Italy) Stella Azzurra	(Israel) Maccabi Tel Aviv
(Spain) Unicaja	(France) Nanterre 92	(Italy) Umana Reyer Venezia	(Poland) Asecco Arka Gdynia
(Spain) Valencia Basket	(Greece) Olympiacos	(Lithuania) Rytas	(Russia) CSKA Moscow
(Germany) Alba Berlin	(Greece) Panathinaikos OPAP	(Lithuania) Žalgiris	(Slovenia) Cedevita Olimpija

== Qualifying tournaments ==
=== Valencia, Spain ===
Spain
- 27–29 December 2019

The first qualifying tournament featured Valencia Basket, 2016 ANGT champion Barcelona, Herbalife Gran Canaria and Unicaja, all from Spain, LDLC ASVEL from France, Cibona from Croatia, Olympiacos from Greece and Tofaş from Turkey. Herbalife Gran Canaria defeated Unicaja 88–72 in the final and advanced to the Final tournament.

==== Group A ====
Pos	Team	Pld	W	L	PF	PA	PD	Qualification
1	(Spain) Unicaja	3	2 (Note: Unicaja 60–58 Valencia Basket)	1	225	217	+8	Final
2	(Spain) Valencia Basket	3	2	1	226	202	+24	3rd place game
3	(Greece) Olympiacos	3	1 (Note: Olympiacos 107–73 Cibona)	2	252	242	+10	5th place game
4	(Croatia) Cibona	3	1	2	229	271	−42	7th place game

Source: adidasngt.com
Notes:

27 December 2019
10:00 (CET)

Boxscore

Valencia Basket (Spain)	81–70	(Greece) Olympiacos
Scoring by quarter: 24–15, 27–18, 15–25, 15–12
Pts: Faure 25; Rebs: Faure 11; Asts: Ferrando 9		Pts: Koloveros 21; Rebs: Nikolaidis, Tsolakis 8 Asts: Nikolaidis, Koloveros 3

L'Alqueria del Basket, Valencia
Attendance: 223 (tentative)
Referees: Neutral

27 December 2019
12:00 (CET)

Boxscore

Unicaja (Spain)	77–84	(Croatia) Cibona
Scoring by quarter: 20–22, 12–28, 24–15, 21–19
Pts: Godspower 15; Rebs: Godspower 12; Asts: Godspower 4		Pts: Prkačin 31; Rebs: Prkačin 10; Asts: Majcunić 7

L'Alqueria del Basket, Valencia
Attendance: 187 (tentative)
Referees: Neutral

27 December 2019
18:00 (CET)

Boxscore

Cibona (Croatia)	72–87	(Spain) Valencia Basket
Scoring by quarter: 26–10, 9–38, 21–22, 16–17
Pts: Buljević 29; Rebs: Buljević 19; Asts: Majcunić 6		Pts: Faure, Jiménez 19; Rebs: Faure 11; Asts: Ferrando 7

L'Alqueria del Basket, Valencia
Attendance: 265 (tentative)
Referees: Neutral

27 December 2019
20:00 (CET)

Boxscore

Olympiacos (Greece)	75–88	(Spain) Unicaja
Scoring by quarter: 9–25, 15–24, 25–14, 26–25
Pts: Nikolaidis 26; Rebs: P. Tsamis 15; Asts: Koloveros 3		Pts: Nzosa 24; Rebs: Nzosa, Godspower 14; Asts: Sánchez 6

L'Alqueria del Basket, Valencia
Attendance: 86 (tentative)
Referees: Neutral

28 December 2019
14:00 (CET)

Boxscore

Cibona (Croatia)	73–107	(Greece) Olympiacos
Scoring by quarter: 20–32, 20–27, 17–27, 16–21
Pts: Buljević 20; Rebs: Prkačin 11; Asts: Paponja 5		Pts: Koloveros 27; Rebs: Nikolaidis 12; Asts: Nikolaidis 9

L'Alqueria del Basket, Valencia
Attendance: 78 (tentative)
Referees: Neutral

28 December 2019
16:00 (CET)

Boxscore

Valencia Basket (Spain)	58–60	(Spain) Unicaja
Scoring by quarter: 9–23, 10–15, 21–12, 18–10
Pts: Bagatskis, Jiménez 13; Rebs: Faure 11; Asts: Ferrando 6		Pts: Sánchez, Godspower 13; Rebs: Godspower 13; Asts: Sánchez 3

L'Alqueria del Basket, Valencia
Attendance: 500 (tentative)
Referees: Neutral

==== Group B ====
Pos	Team	Pld	W	L	PF	PA	PD	Qualification
1	(Spain) Herbalife Gran Canaria	3	2 (Note: Herbalife Gran Canaria 1–1, +15 PD; Barcelona 1–1, +2 PD; LDLC ASVEL 1–1, −17 PD)	1	240	184	+56	Final
2	(Spain) Barcelona	3	2	1	213	199	+14	3rd place game
3	(France) LDLC ASVEL	3	2	1	226	235	−9	5th place game
4	(Turkey) Tofaş	3	0	3	162	223	−61	7th place game

Source: adidasngt.com
Notes:

27 December 2019
14:00 (CET)

Boxscore

Barcelona (Spain)	76–64	(Turkey) Tofaş
Scoring by quarter: 12–16, 21–16, 23–16, 20–16
Pts: Tendero 16; Rebs: Badji 11; Asts: Bonilla, Mulió 6		Pts: Peksari 16; Rebs: Tuna 15; Asts: Peksari 6

L'Alqueria del Basket, Valencia
Attendance: 203 (tentative)
Referees: Neutral

27 December 2019
16:00 (CET)

Boxscore

Herbalife Gran Canaria (Spain)	91–93	(France) LDLC ASVEL
Scoring by quarter: 14–23, 34–21, 22–20, 21–29
Pts: R. López 35; Rebs: R. López 13; Asts: six players 2		Pts: Doualla 27; Rebs: Houinsou, Sam Mbaka 9 Asts: Strazel 8

L'Alqueria del Basket, Valencia
Attendance: 146 (tentative)
Referees: Neutral

28 December 2019
10:00 (CET)

Boxscore

LDLC ASVEL (France)	63–82	(Spain) Barcelona
Scoring by quarter: 17–19, 15–19, 15–25, 16–19
Pts: Doualla 18; Rebs: Kamanda 7 Asts: Strazel 5		Pts: Tendero 19; Rebs: Badji 9 Asts: Bonilla 7

L'Alqueria del Basket, Valencia
Attendance: 146 (tentative)
Referees: Neutral

28 December 2019
12:00 (CET)

Boxscore

Tofaş (Turkey)	36–77	(Spain) Herbalife Gran Canaria
Scoring by quarter: 9–17, 14–26, 6–23, 7–11
Pts: Çelik 13; Rebs: Büyüktuncel 5 Asts: Peksari 4		Pts: Montero 22; Rebs: Montero, P. López 8 Asts: four players 3

L'Alqueria del Basket, Valencia
Attendance: 206 (tentative)
Referees: Neutral

28 December 2019
18:00 (CET)

Boxscore

Herbalife Gran Canaria (Spain)	72–55	(Spain) Barcelona
Scoring by quarter: 21–18, 17–7, 16–18, 18–12
Pts: R. López 23; Rebs: Diop 15; Asts: P. López 5		Pts: Badji 15; Rebs: Badji 13; Asts: Caicedo 4

L'Alqueria del Basket, Valencia
Attendance: 270 (tentative)
Referees: Neutral

28 December 2019
20:00 (CET)

Boxscore

Tofaş (Turkey)	62–70	(France) LDLC ASVEL
Scoring by quarter: 17–13, 18–22, 11–21, 16–14
Pts: Atsüren 13; Rebs: Taşkin 11; Asts: Tuna 4		Pts: Strazel 27; Rebs: Kamanda 7 Asts: Houinsou 6

L'Alqueria del Basket, Valencia
Attendance: 67 (tentative)
Referees: Neutral

==== 7th place game ====
29 December 2019
09:00 (CET)

Boxscore

Cibona (Croatia)	78–63	(Turkey) Tofaş
Scoring by quarter: 17–21, 20–8, 21–15, 20–19
Pts: Prkačin 22; Rebs: Prkačin 18; Asts: Paponja 8		Pts: Büyüktuncel, Usta 11; Rebs: Tuna 7 Asts: Peksari 5

La Fonteta, Valencia
Attendance: 82 (tentative)
Referees: Neutral

==== 5th place game ====
29 December 2019
11:00 (CET)

Boxscore

Olympiacos (Greece)	76–87	(France) LDLC ASVEL
Scoring by quarter: 9–22, 23–24, 22–15, 22–26
Pts: Koloveros 34; Rebs: P. Tsamis 11; Asts: Koloveros 4		Pts: Doualla 21; Rebs: Kamanda 11; Asts: Houinsou 8

La Fonteta, Valencia
Attendance: 126 (tentative)
Referees: Neutral

==== 3rd place game ====
29 December 2019
13:00 (CET)

Boxscore

Valencia Basket (Spain)	98–72	(Spain) Barcelona
Scoring by quarter: 30–15, 22–21, 26–17, 20–19
Pts: Faure 27; Rebs: Faure 14; Asts: Ferrando, Jiménez 7		Pts: Tendero 20; Rebs: Caicedo 9 Asts: Caicedo 6

La Fonteta, Valencia
Attendance: 833 (tentative)
Referees: Neutral

==== Final ====
29 December 2019
15:00 (CET)

Boxscore

Unicaja (Spain)	72–88	(Spain) Herbalife Gran Canaria
Scoring by quarter: 19–15, 10–19, 23–25, 20–29
Pts: Rodríguez 17; Rebs: Godspower 11; Asts: Godspower, Sánchez 3		Pts: Montero 30; Rebs: R. López 13; Asts: Montero 7

La Fonteta, Valencia
Attendance: 458 (tentative)
Referees: Neutral

==== Final ranking ====
Qualified to the Final tournament

Rank	Team
1	(Spain) Herbalife Gran Canaria
2	(Spain) Unicaja
3	(Spain) Valencia Basket
4	(Spain) Barcelona
5	(France) LDLC ASVEL
6	(Greece) Olympiacos
7	(Croatia) Cibona
8	(Turkey) Tofaş

=== Munich, Germany ===
Germany
- 17–19 January 2020

The second qualifying tournament featured reigning ANGT champion Real Madrid from Spain, ALBA Berlin, Bayern Munich, Porsche Ludwigsburg and ratiopharm Ulm, all from Germany, three-time ANGT champion CSKA Moscow from Russia, Stellazzurra Rome from Italy and Promitheas Patras from Greece. Real Madrid defeated Stellazzurra 104–88 in the final and advanced to the Final tournament for a seventh straight year.

==== Group A ====
Pos	Team	Pld	W	L	PF	PA	PD	Qualification
1	(Italy) Stella Azzurra	3	3	0	288	199	+89	Final
2	(Germany) Bayern Munich	3	2	1	230	229	+1	3rd place game
3	(Russia) CSKA Moscow	3	1	2	205	253	−48	5th place game
4	(Germany) ratiopharm Ulm	3	0	3	226	268	−42	7th place game

Source: adidasngt.com

17 January 2020
09:00 (CET)

Boxscore

Stella Azzurra (Italy)	91–65	(Germany) ratiopharm Ulm
Scoring by quarter: 19–21, 28–14, 25–16, 19–14
Pts: Canka 23; Rebs: Onojaife 9 Asts: Adeola 5		Pts: Bulajić, Miličić 16; Rebs: Grbović 6 Asts: Bulajić, Hanzalek 3

Audi Dome, Munich
Attendance: 500 (tentative)
Referees: Neutral

17 January 2020
11:00 (CET)

Boxscore

Bayern Munich (Germany)	69–55	(Russia) CSKA Moscow
Scoring by quarter: 14–14, 20–13, 21–19, 14–9
Pts: Lukosius 18; Rebs: Hoffmann 10; Asts: Grant, Lukosius 4		Pts: Kardanakhishvili 19; Rebs: Kuzemkin 9 Asts: Maltsev, Kardanakhishvili 4

Audi Dome, Munich
Attendance: 500 (tentative)
Referees: Neutral

17 January 2020
17:00 (CET)

Boxscore

CSKA Moscow (Russia)	61–100	(Italy) Stella Azzurra
Scoring by quarter: 20–27, 12–27, 20–20, 9–26
Pts: Kardanakhishvili 18; Rebs: Maltsev, Kuzemkin 7 Asts: Kardanakhishvili 5		Pts: Canka 18; Rebs: Ndzie 13; Asts: Giordano 5

Audi Dome, Munich
Attendance: 350 (tentative)
Referees: Neutral

17 January 2020
19:00 (CET)

Boxscore

ratiopharm Ulm (Germany)	77–88	(Germany) Bayern Munich
Scoring by quarter: 18–27, 17–19, 23–21, 19–21
Pts: Miličić 19; Rebs: Miličić, Grbović 8 Asts: Bulajić, Grbović 4		Pts: Grant 33; Rebs: Sillah 12; Asts: Lukosius 4

Audi Dome, Munich
Attendance: 0 (tentative)
Referees: Neutral

18 January 2020
13:00 (CET)

Boxscore

ratiopharm Ulm (Germany)	84–89	(Russia) CSKA Moscow
Scoring by quarter: 23–24, 21–18, 20–22, 20–25
Pts: Leuchten 20; Rebs: Grbović 10; Asts: Bulajić 10		Pts: Maltsev 24; Rebs: Maltsev 6 Asts: Kardanakhishvili 7

Audi Dome, Munich
Attendance: 0 (Tentative)
Referees: Neutral

18 January 2020
15:00 (CET)

Boxscore

Stella Azzurra (Italy)	97–73	(Germany) Bayern Munich
Scoring by quarter: 19–17, 28–20, 33–17, 17–19
Pts: Visintin 21; Rebs: Onojaife 7 Asts: Adeola 5		Pts: Wulff 16; Rebs: Sillah 11; Asts: Grant 4

Audi Dome, Munich
Attendance: 0 (tentative)
Referees: Neutral

==== Group B ====
Pos	Team	Pld	W	L	PF	PA	PD	Qualification
1	(Spain) Real Madrid	3	3	0	290	206	+84	Final
2	(Germany) Porsche Ludwigsburg	3	2	1	244	226	+18	3rd place game
3	(Greece) Promitheas	3	1	2	248	280	−32	5th place game
4	(Germany) Alba Berlin	3	0	3	208	278	−70	7th place game

Source: adidasngt.com

17 January 2020
13:00 (CET)

Boxscore

Alba Berlin (Germany)	43–88	(Germany) Porsche Ludwigsburg
Scoring by quarter: 10–32, 17–23, 8–12, 8–21
Pts: Adekunle 9 Rebs: Sedlak 9 Asts: Lademacher, Rapieque 3		Pts: Hukporti 24; Rebs: Hukporti 8 Asts: Kovačević 9

Audi Dome, Munich
Attendance: 350 (tentative)
Referees: Neutral

17 January 2020
15:00 (CET)

Boxscore

Real Madrid (Spain)	98–67	(Greece) Promitheas
Scoring by quarter: 26–25, 26–17, 22–12, 24–13
Pts: Ndiaye 22; Rebs: Ndiaye 15; Asts: Duščak 5		Pts: Mantzoukas 22; Rebs: Mantzoukas 12; Asts: Kafezas, Mantzoukas 4

Audi Dome, Munich
Attendance: 400 (tentative)
Referees: Neutral

18 January 2020
09:00 (CET)

Boxscore

Promitheas (Greece)	93–87	(Germany) Alba Berlin
Scoring by quarter: 24–21, 20–25, 29–12, 20–29
Pts: Mantzoukas 49; Rebs: Mantzoukas 19; Asts: Bazinas 8		Pts: Tilly 22; Rebs: Sedlak 9 Asts: Dai Hao 6

Audi Dome, Munich
Attendance: 0 (tentative)
Referees: Neutral

18 January 2020
11:00 (CET)

Boxscore

Porsche Ludwigsburg (Germany)	61–95	(Spain) Real Madrid
Scoring by quarter: 8–28, 20–15, 12–25, 21–27
Pts: Hounnou 15; Rebs: Cotoara, Bruce 5 Asts: Hounnou 4		Pts: Vukčević 18; Rebs: Kostadinov 8 Asts: Ramos-Yzquierdo, Spagnolo 4

Audi Dome, Munich
Attendance: 400 (tentative)
Referees: Neutral

18 January 2020
17:00 (CET)

Boxscore

Porsche Ludwigsburg (Germany)	95–88	(Greece) Promitheas
Scoring by quarter: 31–20, 27–26, 19–25, 18–17
Pts: Blunt 23; Rebs: three players 8 Asts: Kovačević 6		Pts: Mantzoukas 35; Rebs: Mantzoukas 13; Asts: Mantzoukas 6

Audi Dome, Munich
Attendance: 0 (tentative)
Referees: Neutral

18 January 2020
19:15 (CET)

Boxscore

Alba Berlin (Germany)	78–97	(Spain) Real Madrid
Scoring by quarter: 14–27, 24–33, 19–18, 21–19
Pts: Adekunle 21; Rebs: Adekunle 8 Asts: Rapieque 7		Pts: Vukčević 20; Rebs: Aquino 7 Asts: Duščak, Núñez 7

Audi Dome, Munich
Attendance: 250 (tentative)
Referees: Neutral

==== 7th place game ====
19 January 2020
10:00 (CET)

Boxscore

ratiopharm Ulm (Germany)	59–81	(Germany) Alba Berlin
Scoring by quarter: 16–16, 18–18, 15–29, 10–18
Pts: Bulajić 13; Rebs: Fuchs 8 Asts: Bulajić 5		Pts: Dai Hao 17; Rebs: Warner 8 Asts: Quinkler 5

Audi Dome, Munich
Attendance: 0 (tentative)
Referees: Neutral

==== 5th place game ====
19 January 2020
12:00 (CET)

Boxscore

CSKA Moscow (Russia)	83–82	(Greece) Promitheas
Scoring by quarter: 22–15, 17–22, 17–27, 27–18
Pts: Maltsev 22; Rebs: Khalturin 6 Asts: Maltsev 6		Pts: Kafezas 24; Rebs: Mantzoukas 7 Asts: Bazinas 4

Audi Dome, Munich
Attendance: 350 (tentative)
Referees: Neutral

==== 3rd place game ====
19 January 2020
14:00 (CET)

Boxscore

Bayern Munich (Germany)	82–78	(Germany) Porsche Ludwigsburg
Scoring by quarter: 25–23, 22–16, 18–21, 17–18
Pts: Skobalj 26; Rebs: Grant 10; Asts: Grant 7		Pts: Kovačević 14; Rebs: Cotoara 10; Asts: Kovačević 4

Audi Dome, Munich
Attendance: 650 (tentative)
Referees: Neutral

==== Final ====
19 January 2020
16:00 (CET)

Boxscore

Stella Azzurra (Italy)	88–104	(Spain) Real Madrid
Scoring by quarter: 22–27, 17–25, 27–29, 22–23
Pts: Žugić 26; Rebs: Onojaife 7 Asts: Giordano, Canka 5		Pts: Kostadinov 23; Rebs: Ndiaye, Kostadinov 9 Asts: Núñez 5

Audi Dome, Munich
Attendance: 700 (tentative)
Referees: Neutral

==== Final ranking ====
Qualified to the Final tournament

Rank	Team
1	(Spain) Real Madrid
2	(Italy) Stella Azzurra
3	(Germany) Bayern Munich
4	(Germany) Porsche Ludwigsburg
5	(Russia) CSKA Moscow
6	(Greece) Promitheas
7	(Germany) Alba Berlin
8	(Germany) ratiopharm Ulm

=== Kaunas, Lithuania ===
Lithuania
- 7–9 February 2020

The third qualifying tournament featured twice ANGT champions Žalgiris and Rytas, both from Lithuania, 2013 ANGT champion Joventut Badalona and Casademont Zaragoza, both from Spain, Fenerbahce Beko from Turkey, Nanterre 92 from France, Umana Reyer Venice from Italy and for the first time Barking Abbey London from England. Rytas defeated Žalgiris 84–63 in the final and advanced to the Final tournament.

==== Group A ====
Pos	Team	Pld	W	L	PF	PA	PD	Qualification
1	(Lithuania) Žalgiris	3	3	0	255	203	+52	Final
2	(France) Nanterre 92	3	2	1	224	226	−2	3rd place game
3	(Italy) Umana Reyer Venezia	3	1	2	206	220	−14	5th place game
4	(Spain) Casademont Zaragoza	3	0	3	234	270	−36	7th place game

Source: adidasngt.com

7 February 2020
09:00 (EET)

Boxscore

Nanterre 92 (France)	77–50	(Italy) Umana Reyer Venezia
Scoring by quarter: 25–15, 18–10, 15–11, 19–14
Pts: Wembanyama 18; Rebs: Wembanyama 16; Asts: N'Joumeck 5		Pts: Berdini 22; Rebs: Kiss 8 Asts: Casarin 5

Žalgirio Arena, Kaunas
Attendance: 150 (tentative)
Referees: Neutral

7 February 2020
11:00 (EET)

Boxscore

Žalgiris (Lithuania)	91–79	(Spain) Casademont Zaragoza
Scoring by quarter: 27–29, 23–10, 20–18, 21–22
Pts: Rubštavičius 19; Rebs: Tamulevičius 11; Asts: Stenionis, Murauskas 4		Pts: Martínez 24; Rebs: Andersson 6 Asts: Knudsen 5

Žalgirio Arena, Kaunas
Attendance: 250 (tentative)
Referees: Neutral

7 February 2020
17:15 (EET)

Boxscore

Umana Reyer Venezia (Italy)	85–69	(Spain) Casademont Zaragoza
Scoring by quarter: 23–13, 24–18, 21–25, 17–13
Pts: Casarin 29; Rebs: Casarin 8 Asts: Berdini, Biancotto 4		Pts: Knudsen 14; Rebs: Andersson 10; Asts: Knudsen 3

Žalgirio Arena, Kaunas
Attendance: 149 (tentative)
Referees: Neutral

7 February 2020
19:15 (EET)

Boxscore

Nanterre 92 (France)	53–90	(Lithuania) Žalgiris
Scoring by quarter: 14–32, 11–11, 14–23, 14–24
Pts: Loemba 11; Rebs: Bulajić, Wembanyama 6 Asts: Ekono 6		Pts: Murauskas 19; Rebs: Jaruševičius, Kojenets 7 Asts: Kneižys 6

Žalgirio Arena, Kaunas
Attendance: 379 (tentative)
Referees: Neutral

8 February 2020
13:00 (EET)

Boxscore

Casademont Zaragoza (Spain)	86–94 (OT)	(France) Nanterre 92
Scoring by quarter: 23–24, 15–17, 24–7, 17–31, Overtime: 7–15
Pts: Martínez 23; Rebs: Andersson 9 Asts: Martínez 7		Pts: Wembanyama 22; Rebs: Wembanyama 15; Asts: Perrault 7

Žalgirio Arena, Kaunas
Attendance: 184 (tentative)
Referees: Neutral

8 February 2020
15:15 (EET)

Boxscore

Žalgiris (Lithuania)	74–71	(Italy) Umana Reyer Venezia
Scoring by quarter: 29–16, 14–19, 19–15, 12–21
Pts: Murauskas 16; Rebs: Murauskas 8 Asts: Stenionis 6		Pts: Berdini 27; Rebs: Kiss 11; Asts: three players 4

Žalgirio Arena, Kaunas
Attendance: 650 (tentative)
Referees: Neutral

==== Group B ====
Pos	Team	Pld	W	L	PF	PA	PD	Qualification
1	(Lithuania) Rytas	3	3	0	275	197	+78	Final
2	(Spain) Joventut	3	1 (Note: Joventut 1–1, +29 PD; Barking Abbey 1–1, –12 PD; Fenerbahçe Beko 1–1, −17 PD)	2	235	215	+20	3rd place game
3	(United Kingdom) Barking Abbey	3	1	2	191	255	−64	5th place game
4	(Turkey) Fenerbahçe Beko	3	1	2	245	279	−34	7th place game

Source: adidasngt.com
Notes:

7 February 2020
13:00 (EET)

Boxscore

Fenerbahçe Beko (Turkey)	85–102	(Lithuania) Rytas
Scoring by quarter: 27–26, 15–25, 22–32, 21–19
Pts: Mutaf 19; Rebs: Bayrak 6 Asts: Yılmaz, Ekşioğlu 4		Pts: Ą Tubelis 31; Rebs: Kalogiros 9 Asts: Marčiulionis 6

Žalgirio Arena, Kaunas
Attendance: 180 (tentative)
Referees: Neutral

7 February 2020
15:15 (EET)

Boxscore

Barking Abbey (United Kingdom)	70–67	(Spain) Joventut
Scoring by quarter: 8–17, 22–16, 17–20, 23–14
Pts: Hildreth 35; Rebs: Eze 11; Asts: Okunola 5		Pts: Helmanis 14; Rebs: Helmanis 12; Asts: Martí 7

Žalgirio Arena, Kaunas
Attendance: 175 (tentative)
Referees: Neutral

8 February 2020
09:00 (EET)

Boxscore

Rytas (Lithuania)	89–37	(United Kingdom) Barking Abbey
Scoring by quarter: 26–18, 20–6, 20–5, 23–8
Pts: Plintauskas 19; Rebs: Kalogiros 12; Asts: Marčiulionis 11		Pts: Hildreth 12; Rebs: Hildreth 7 Asts: Emejuru 3

Žalgirio Arena, Kaunas
Attendance: 0 (tentative)
Referees: Neutral

8 February 2020
11:00 (EET)

Boxscore

Joventut (Spain)	93–61	(Turkey) Fenerbahçe Beko
Scoring by quarter: 23–17, 30–12, 25–13, 15–19
Pts: Domenech 21; Rebs: Juárez 7 Asts: Martí 7		Pts: Mutaf 12; Rebs: Mutaf 10; Asts: Ülker 3

Žalgirio Arena, Kaunas
Attendance: 137 (tentative)
Referees: Neutral

8 February 2020
17:15 (EET)

Boxscore

Fenerbahçe Beko (Turkey)	99–84	(United Kingdom) Barking Abbey
Scoring by quarter: 20–23, 24–31, 26–9, 29–21
Pts: Mutaf 27; Rebs: Mutaf 9 Asts: Yılmaz 7		Pts: Hildreth 35; Rebs: Hildreth 10; Asts: Hildreth 6

Žalgirio Arena, Kaunas
Attendance: 156 (tentative)
Referees: Neutral

8 February 2020
19:15 (EET)

Boxscore

Rytas (Lithuania)	84–75	(Spain) Joventut
Scoring by quarter: 19–18, 13–18, 20–15, 32–24
Pts: Marčiulionis 25; Rebs: Ą Tubelis 18; Asts: Marčiulionis 7		Pts: Domenech 18; Rebs: three players 7 Asts: Martí 11

Žalgirio Arena, Kaunas
Attendance: 207 (tentative)
Referees: Neutral

==== 7th place game ====
9 February 2020
09:00 (EET)

Boxscore

Casademont Zaragoza (Spain)	87–93	(Turkey) Fenerbahçe Beko
Scoring by quarter: 22–25, 19–19, 19–21, 27–28
Pts: Knudsen 25; Rebs: Martínez 11; Asts: Martínez, Hernandez 5		Pts: Mutaf 30; Rebs: Ülker 9 Asts: Ülker 7

Žalgirio Arena, Kaunas
Attendance: 115 (tentative)
Referees: Neutral

==== 5th place game ====
9 February 2020
11:00 (EET)

Boxscore

Umana Reyer Venezia (Italy)	54–74	(United Kingdom) Barking Abbey
Scoring by quarter: 14–18, 16–20, 14–12, 10–24
Pts: Berdini, Casarin 16; Rebs: Kiss 8 Asts: Casarin 3		Pts: Hildreth 21; Rebs: Boardman-Raffet 10; Asts: Hildreth 9

Žalgirio Arena, Kaunas
Attendance: 137 (tentative)
Referees: Neutral

==== 3rd place game ====
9 February 2020
13:00 (EET)

Boxscore

Nanterre 92 (France)	52–107	(Spain) Joventut
Scoring by quarter: 13–26, 13–27, 16–28, 10–26
Pts: Wembanyama 16; Rebs: Wembanyama 11; Asts: N'Joumeck 3		Pts: Domenech 27; Rebs: Domenech 11; Asts: Martí 10

Žalgirio Arena, Kaunas
Attendance: 315 (tentative)
Referees: Neutral

==== Final ====
9 February 2020
15:15 (EET)

Boxscore

Žalgiris (Lithuania)	63–84	(Lithuania) Rytas
Scoring by quarter: 19–19, 17–21, 16–23, 11–21
Pts: Rubštavičius 20; Rebs: three players 6 Asts: Stenionis 5		Pts: Marčiulionis, Ą Tubelis 25; Rebs: Ą Tubelis 15; Asts: Rubinas 4

Žalgirio Arena, Kaunas
Attendance: 1543 (tentative)
Referees: Neutral

==== Final ranking ====
Qualified to the Final tournament

Rank	Team
1	(Lithuania) Rytas
2	(Lithuania) Žalgiris
3	(Spain) Joventut
4	(France) Nanterre 92
5	(United Kingdom) Barking Abbey
6	(Italy) Umana Reyer Venezia
7	(Turkey) Fenerbahçe Beko
8	(Spain) Casademont Zaragoza

=== Belgrade, Serbia ===
Serbia
- 21–23 February 2020

The fourth qualifying tournament was featured 2014 ANGT champion Crvena zvezda mts plus fellow Serbian sides Mega Bemax and Partizan NIS, two-time ANGT champion CFBB Paris from France, Cedevita Olimpija from Slovenia, Asseco Arka Gdynia from Poland, Maccabi Tel Aviv from Israel and Panathinaikos OPAP from Greece. Traditionally, the tournament in Belgrade organizes a slam dunk and 3 points shootout contest before the final. Partizan NIS defeated CFBB Paris 79–67 in the final and advanced to the Final tournament.

==== Group A ====
Pos	Team	Pld	W	L	PF	PA	PD	Qualification
1	(Serbia) Partizan NIS	3	3	0	261	200	+61	Final
2	(Israel) Maccabi Tel Aviv	3	1 (Note: Maccabi Tel Aviv 1–1, +20 PD; Crvena zvezda mts 1–1, +10 PD; Panathinaikos OPAP 1–1, −30 PD)	2	220	221	−1	3rd place game
3	(Serbia) Crvena zvezda mts	3	1	2	224	215	+9	5th place game
4	(Greece) Panathinaikos OPAP	3	1	2	193	262	−69	7th place game

Source: adidasngt.com
Notes:

21 February 2020
10:00 (CET)

Boxscore

Panathinaikos OPAP (Greece)	69–68	(Serbia) Crvena zvezda mts
Scoring by quarter: 19–14, 15–13, 18–21, 17–20
Pts: Giotis 21; Rebs: Giotis 5 Asts: Kontoudis 8		Pts: Manojlović 19; Rebs: Joksimović 8 Asts: Manojlović, Ostojić 6

Železnik Hall, Belgrade
Attendance: 300 (tentative)
Referees: Neutral

21 February 2020
12:00 (CET)

Boxscore

Partizan NIS (Serbia)	81–60	(Israel) Maccabi Tel Aviv
Scoring by quarter: 13–15, 12–20, 34–13, 22–12
Pts: Petrović 22; Rebs: Živojinović 12; Asts: Todorović 9		Pts: Rinski 16; Rebs: Ozeri 7 Asts: Aharoni 7

Železnik Hall, Belgrade
Attendance: 200 (tentative)
Referees: Neutral

21 February 2020
18:00 (CET)

Boxscore

Crvena zvezda mts (Serbia)	79–68	(Israel) Maccabi Tel Aviv
Scoring by quarter: 29−22, 18−20, 26−11, 6−15
Pts: Manojlović 18; Rebs: Anđušić 14; Asts: Ostojić 8		Pts: Levin 26; Rebs: Ozeri 6 Asts: Aharoni 7

Železnik Hall, Belgrade
Attendance: 150 (tentative)
Referees: Neutral

21 February 2020
20:00 (CET)

Boxscore

Panathinaikos OPAP (Greece)	63–102	(Serbia) Partizan NIS
Scoring by quarter: 16−26, 15−27, 10−24, 22−25
Pts: Giotis 25; Rebs: Kontoudis 5 Asts: Sigalas 5		Pts: Radovanović 20; Rebs: Živojinović 10; Asts: Todorović 5

Železnik Hall, Belgrade
Attendance: 200 (tentative)
Referees: Neutral

22 February 2020
14:00 (CET)

Boxscore

Maccabi Tel Aviv (Israel)	92–61	(Greece) Panathinaikos OPAP
Scoring by quarter: 29−23, 19−11, 21−8, 23−19
Pts: Rinski 22; Rebs: Levin 10; Asts: Aharoni 8		Pts: Giotis 25; Rebs: Kostopoulos, Giotis 4 Asts: Kostopoulos 3

Železnik Hall, Belgrade
Attendance: 100 (tentative)
Referees: Neutral

22 February 2020
16:00 (CET)

Boxscore

Partizan NIS (Serbia)	78–77	(Serbia) Crvena zvezda mts
Scoring by quarter: 16−18, 15−27, 19−16, 28−16
Pts: Stefanović 22; Rebs: Jovanović 11; Asts: Todorović 7		Pts: Branković 17; Rebs: Anđušić 10; Asts: Manojlović 6

Železnik Hall, Belgrade
Attendance: 400 (tentative)
Referees: Neutral

==== Group B ====
Pos	Team	Pld	W	L	PF	PA	PD	Qualification
1	(France) CFBB Paris	3	2 (Note: CFBB Paris 1–1, +14 PD; Mega Bemax 1–1, –2 PD; Cedevita Olimpija 1–1, −12 PD)	1	223	183	+40	Final
2	(Serbia) Mega Bemax	3	2	1	259	244	+15	3rd place game
3	(Slovenia) Cedevita Olimpija	3	2	1	234	241	−7	5th place game
4	(Poland) Asecco Arka Gdynia	3	0	3	227	275	−48	7th place game

Source: adidasngt.com
Notes:

21 February 2020
14:00 (CET)

Boxscore

CFBB Paris (France)	75–60	(Slovenia) Cedevita Olimpija
Scoring by quarter: 22−19, 15−24, 22−13, 16−4
Pts: Demahis 16; Rebs: Dessert 15; Asts: Demahis 7		Pts: Malovčić 17; Rebs: Bošnjak 12; Asts: Klavzar 6

Železnik Hall, Belgrade
Attendance: 150 (tentative)
Referees: Neutral

21 February 2020
16:00 (CET)

Boxscore

Mega Bemax (Serbia)	107–90	(Poland) Asecco Arka Gdynia
Scoring by quarter: 35−19, 33−25, 26−19, 13−27
Pts: Mušikić 20; Rebs: Krtinić 11; Asts: Mušikić 8		Pts: Lis 18; Rebs: Tomaszewski 8 Asts: Gordon 11

Železnik Hall, Belgrade
Attendance: 150 (tentative)
Referees: Neutral

22 February 2020
10:00 (CET)

Boxscore

Asecco Arka Gdynia (Poland)	54–80	(France) CFBB Paris
Scoring by quarter: 16−21, 13−19, 13−26, 12−14
Pts: Gordon 13; Rebs: three players 4 Asts: Walkowiak 4		Pts: Batcho 21; Rebs: Ajinca 8 Asts: Demahis 6

Železnik Hall, Belgrade
Attendance: 50 (tentative)
Referees: Neutral

22 February 2020
12:00 (CET)

Boxscore

Mega Bemax (Serbia)	83–86	(Slovenia) Cedevita Olimpija
Scoring by quarter: 19−26, 21−22, 23−22, 20−16
Pts: Paunonvić 21; Rebs: Paunonvić, Kovačević 8 Asts: Andrić 9		Pts: Malovčić 24; Rebs: Bošnjak 9 Asts: Klavzar 9

Železnik Hall, Belgrade
Attendance: 150 (tentative)
Referees: Neutral

22 February 2020
18:00 (CET)

Boxscore

Cedevita Olimpija (Slovenia)	88–83	(Poland) Asecco Arka Gdynia
Scoring by quarter: 26−26, 28−20, 19−14, 15−23
Pts: Sytnikov 25; Rebs: Gontar 10; Asts: Klavzar 14		Pts: Tomaszewski 22; Rebs: four players 5 Asts: Gordon 7

Železnik Hall, Belgrade
Attendance: 150 (tentative)
Referees: Neutral

22 February 2020
20:00 (CET)

Boxscore

CFBB Paris (France)	68–69	(Serbia) Mega Bemax
Scoring by quarter: 11−31, 20−18, 18−11, 19−9
Pts: Ajinca 19; Rebs: Batcho 11; Asts: Traore 3		Pts: Kovačević 18; Rebs: Kovačević 9 Asts: Paunović 5

Železnik Hall, Belgrade
Attendance: 150 (tentative)
Referees: Neutral

==== 7th place game ====
23 February 2020
12:00 (CET)

Boxscore

Panathinaikos OPAP (Greece)	75–94	(Poland) Asecco Arka Gdynia
Scoring by quarter: 11−20, 16−28, 24−17, 24−29
Pts: Giotis 30; Rebs: Giotis 8 Asts: Kontoudis 5		Pts: Czoska 17; Rebs: Perzanovski 8 Asts: Czoska, Lis 2

Železnik Hall, Belgrade
Attendance: 50 (tentative)
Referees: Neutral

==== 5th place game ====
23 February 2020
14:00 (CET)

Boxscore

Crvena zvezda mts (Serbia)	59–66	(Slovenia) Cedevita Olimpija
Scoring by quarter: 8−23, 11−20, 23−7, 17−16
Pts: Mihailović 14; Rebs: Ilić 7 Asts: Mihailović 4		Pts: Sytnikov 20; Rebs: Malovčić 11; Asts: Klavzar 9

Železnik Hall, Belgrade
Attendance: 100 (tentative)
Referees: Neutral

==== 3rd place game ====
23 February 2020
16:00 (CET)

Boxscore

Maccabi Tel Aviv (Israel)	80–96	(Serbia) Mega Bemax
Scoring by quarter: 16−34, 17−23, 23−15, 24−24
Pts: Rinski 21; Rebs: Aharoni 8 Asts: Aharoni 14		Pts: Mušikić 26; Rebs: Đurišić 7 Asts: Paunović 8

Železnik Hall, Belgrade
Attendance: 100 (tentative)
Referees: Neutral

==== Final ====
23 February 2020
20:00 (CET)

Boxscore

Partizan NIS (Serbia)	79–67	(France) CFBB Paris
Scoring by quarter: 19−14, 21−14, 19−25, 20−14
Pts: Radovanović 12; Rebs: Jovanović 8 Asts: Petrović 7		Pts: Batcho 24; Rebs: Batcho 15; Asts: Demahis 6

Železnik Hall, Belgrade
Attendance: 2000 (tentative)
Referees: Neutral

==== Final ranking ====
Qualified to the Final tournament

Rank	Team
1	(Serbia) Partizan NIS
2	(France) CFBB Paris
3	(Serbia) Mega Bemax
4	(Israel) Maccabi Tel Aviv
5	(Slovenia) Cedevita Olimpija
6	(Serbia) Crvena zvezda mts
7	(Poland) Asecco Arka Gdynia
8	(Greece) Panathinaikos OPAP

== Final tournament ==
=== Cologne, Germany ===
- 21–24 May 2020
Germany

==== Qualified teams ====
- (Spain) Herbalife Gran Canaria
- (Spain) Real Madrid
- (Lithuania) Rytas
- (Serbia) Partizan NIS
