= Daniele Parente =

Italian basketball coach and player (born 1978)

- Daniele Parente at Virtus Bologna in 2026

Virtus Bologna
- Title: Assistant coach
- League: LBA; EuroLeague

Personal information
- Born: June 14, 1978 (age 48) Chieri, Italy
- Listed height: 1.90 m (6 ft 3 in)
- Listed weight: 78 kg (172 lb)

Career information
- Playing career: 1996–2014
- Position: Point guard

Career history

Playing
- 1996–2004: Livorno
- 2004–2006: Virtus Bologna
- 2006: Pesaro
- 2006–2009: Brindisi
- 2009–2010: Pavia
- 2010–2013: PMS Torino
- 2013–2014: Treviso

Coaching
- 2017–2018: Trapani (assistant)
- 2018–2024: Trapani
- 2024–present: Virtus Bologna (assistant)

Career highlights
- As head coach: LNP Supercup champion (2023)

Daniele Parente (born June 14, 1978) is an Italian professional basketball coach and former player who is the assistant coach of Virtus Bologna of the Italian Lega Basket Serie A and the Euroleague. As a player he played at the point guard position.

== Professional career ==
Parente began his basketball career in the youth system of PGS Vasto. He subsequently joined Pallacanestro Don Bosco Livorno, where, after completing his youth career, he played eight seasons between Serie A and Serie A2.

After his years in Livorno, in the 2004–05 season, Parente joined Virtus Bologna in Serie A2. He was one of the point guards of the team which earned promotion to Serie A by winning the playoffs. The following season, he remained in Bologna but suffered a serious Achilles tendon injury.

Parente remained sidelined for more than a year and returned to action in March 2006 with Scavolini Pesaro, who had been forced to restart from the third tier of Italian basketball following the club's bankruptcy. Parente played only a few minutes during the playoffs, which Scavolini won, earning promotion back to Serie A2.

He subsequently played for New Basket Brindisi and Pallacanestro Pavia. In the 2010–11 season, he joined PMS Torino. On 13 August 2013, his move to Universo Treviso Basket was officially announced, with the team competing in National Division B.

== Coaching career ==
In the summer of 2014, Parente became a youth team coach at Pallacanestro Trapani, and in 2017 was appointed assistant coach to Ugo Ducarello. Following Ducarello's dismissal in March 2018, Parente took over as head coach of the first team. He was subsequently confirmed in the position for the following seasons. In March 2024, he was dismissed by the club.

In the 2024–25 he returned to Virtus Bologna, this time as an assistant coach to Luca Banchi, being confirmed also under coaches Duško Ivanović and Álex Mumbrú.
