= Ibou Badji =

Senegalese basketball player (born 2002)

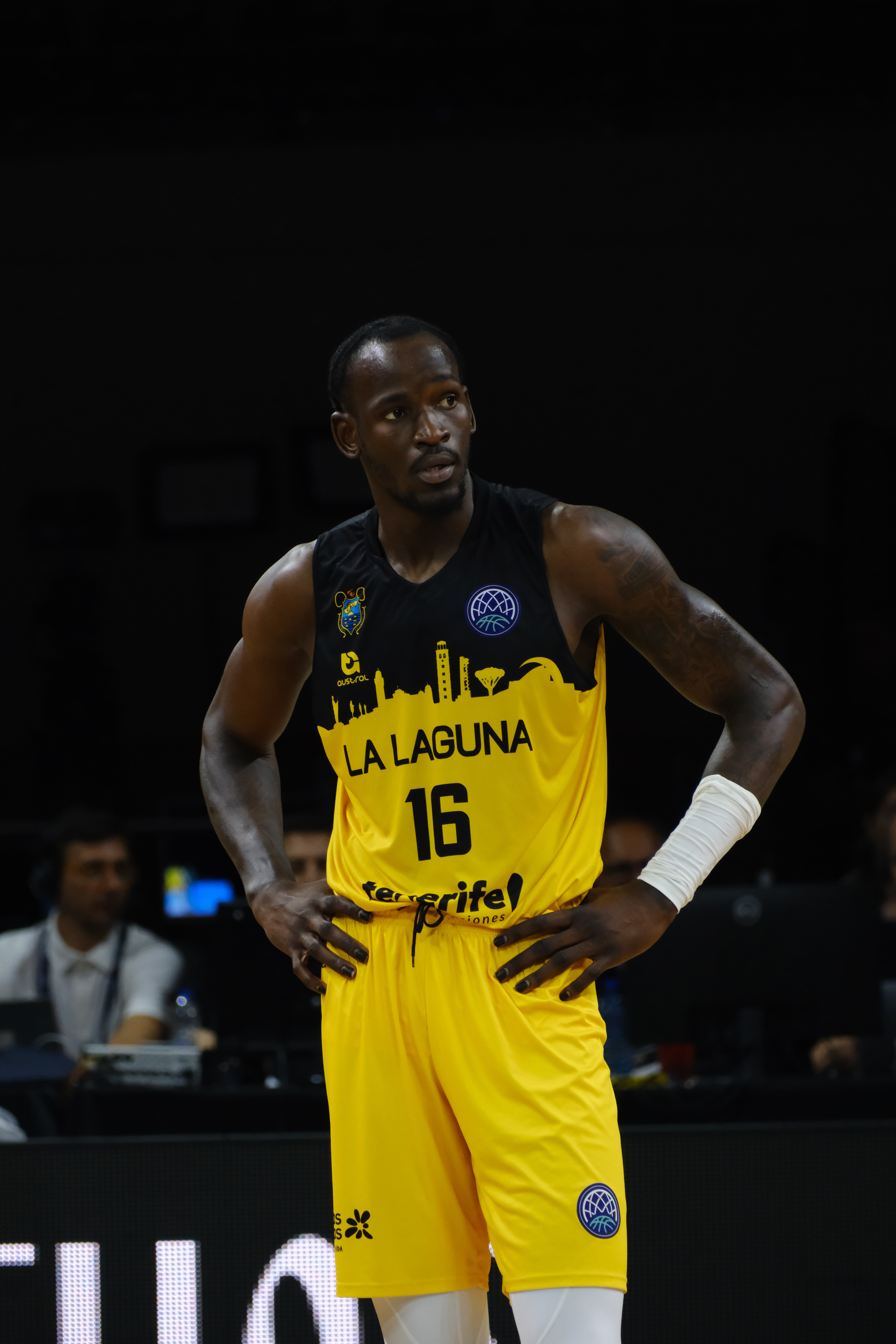
- Badji with La Laguna Tenerife in 2025

No. 16 – Shenzhen Leopards
- Position: Center
- League: Chinese Basketball Association

Personal information
- Born: 13 October 2002 (age 24) Dakar, Senegal
- Listed height: 7 ft 1 in (2.16 m)
- Listed weight: 250 lb (113 kg)

Career information
- High school: NBA Academy Africa (Saly, Senegal)
- NBA draft: 2022: undrafted
- Playing career: 2019–present

Career history
- 2019–2021: FC Barcelona B
- 2021–2022: Força Lleida CE
- 2022–2023: Wisconsin Herd
- 2023–2024: Portland Trail Blazers
- 2023–2024: →Rip City Remix
- 2024–2025: Wisconsin Herd
- 2025: La Laguna Tenerife
- 2025–2026: Greensboro Swarm
- 2026: Windy City Bulls
- 2026–present: Shenzhen Leopards

Career highlights
- NBA G League All-Defensive Team (2025); NBA G League blocks leader (2025)
- Stats at NBA.com
- Stats at Basketball Reference
Medals
Men's basketball
Representing Senegal
AfroBasket
Bronze medal – third place	2025 Angola

Ibou Dianko Badji (born 13 October 2002) is a Senegalese professional basketball player for the Shenzhen Leopards of the Chinese Basketball Association (CBA).

== Early life and career ==
In 2017–18, Badji trained with NBA Academy Africa in Saly, Senegal, where he emerged as one of the best prospects in his age group. By the time he turned 15 years old, he stood about 2.16 m (7 ft 1 in) with a 2.29 m (7 ft 6 in) wingspan. On 27 December 2018, Badji signed with Spanish basketball club FC Barcelona and began playing for its youth sections. In December 2019, he played for U18 FC Barcelona at ANGT Valencia, where he averaged eight points, 8.8 rebounds and five blocks per game.

== Professional career ==
=== Barcelona (2019–2021) ===
To prepare for the 2019–20 season, Badji trained with the first team of Barcelona. He spent much of the season playing for FC Barcelona B, the club's reserve team, in the third-tier LEB Plata. On 26 October 2019, Badji had a season-high 12 points, nine rebounds and five blocks in an 86–77 win over Prat. On 18 January 2020, he recorded eight points and a season-high eight blocks in an 88–80 victory over Prat.

=== Força Lleida (2021–2022) ===
On 4 October 2021, Badji signed with Força Lleida CE of the LEB Oro.

=== Wisconsin Herd (2022–2023) ===
After going undrafted in the 2022 NBA draft, on 3 November 2022, Badji was named to the opening night roster for the Wisconsin Herd after signing an Exhibition 10 contract.

On 18 November 2022, the Portland Trail Blazers announced that they had signed Badji to a two-way contract. On 7 March 2023, he underwent surgery on his left knee and was ruled out for at least eight weeks, thus missing out on playing the rest of the season.

On 6 July 2023, Badji signed another two-way contract with the Trail Blazers, but was waived on 24 October. Six days later, he returned to the Herd.

=== Portland Trail Blazers (2023–2024) ===
On 22 November 2023, Badji signed another two-way contract with the Portland Trail Blazers. On 26 December 2023, Badji made his NBA debut for the Trail Blazers in a 130–113 win over the Sacramento Kings and two days later, he put up 7 points, 9 rebounds, and 3 blocks in 14 minutes of action in a 118–105 loss to the San Antonio Spurs. With those appearances, he became the first prospect from the NBA Academy Africa to successfully enter the NBA properly.

=== Return to Wisconsin (2024–2025) ===
On 12 September 2024, Badji signed with the Milwaukee Bucks, but was waived the same day. On 28 October, he rejoined the Wisconsin Herd.

=== La Laguna Tenerife (2025) ===
On April 3, 2025, Badji signed with La Laguna Tenerife of the Spanish Liga ACB.

=== Greensboro Swarm (2025–2026) ===
On September 30, 2025, Badji signed a training camp contract with the Charlotte Hornets. He appeared in one preseason game, recording two points and three rebounds in 11 minutes during a loss to the Oklahoma City Thunder, before being waived by the Hornets on October 14, prior to the start of the regular season. On November 6, 2025, Badji was named to the Greensboro Swarm opening night roster.

== National team career ==
Badji represented Senegal at the 2019 FIBA Under-19 Basketball World Cup in Heraklion, Greece. He averaged 6.9 points, 5.1 rebounds and 3.1 blocks per game, which ranked second in the tournament, as his team finished in 15th place.

== Career statistics ==
Legend
GP	Games played	GS	Games started	MPG	Minutes per game
FG%	Field goal percentage	3P%	3-point field goal percentage	FT%	Free throw percentage
RPG	Rebounds per game	APG	Assists per game	SPG	Steals per game
BPG	Blocks per game	PPG	Points per game	**Bold**	Career high

=== NBA ===
==== Regular season ====
Year	Team	GP	GS	MPG	FG%	3P%	FT%	RPG	APG	SPG	BPG	PPG
2023–24	Portland	22	1	10.3	.636	—	.500	2.3	.6	.1	.9	1.5
Career		22	1	10.3	.636	—	.500	2.3	.6	.1	.9	1.5
