= Ariel Hukporti =

German basketball player (born 2002)

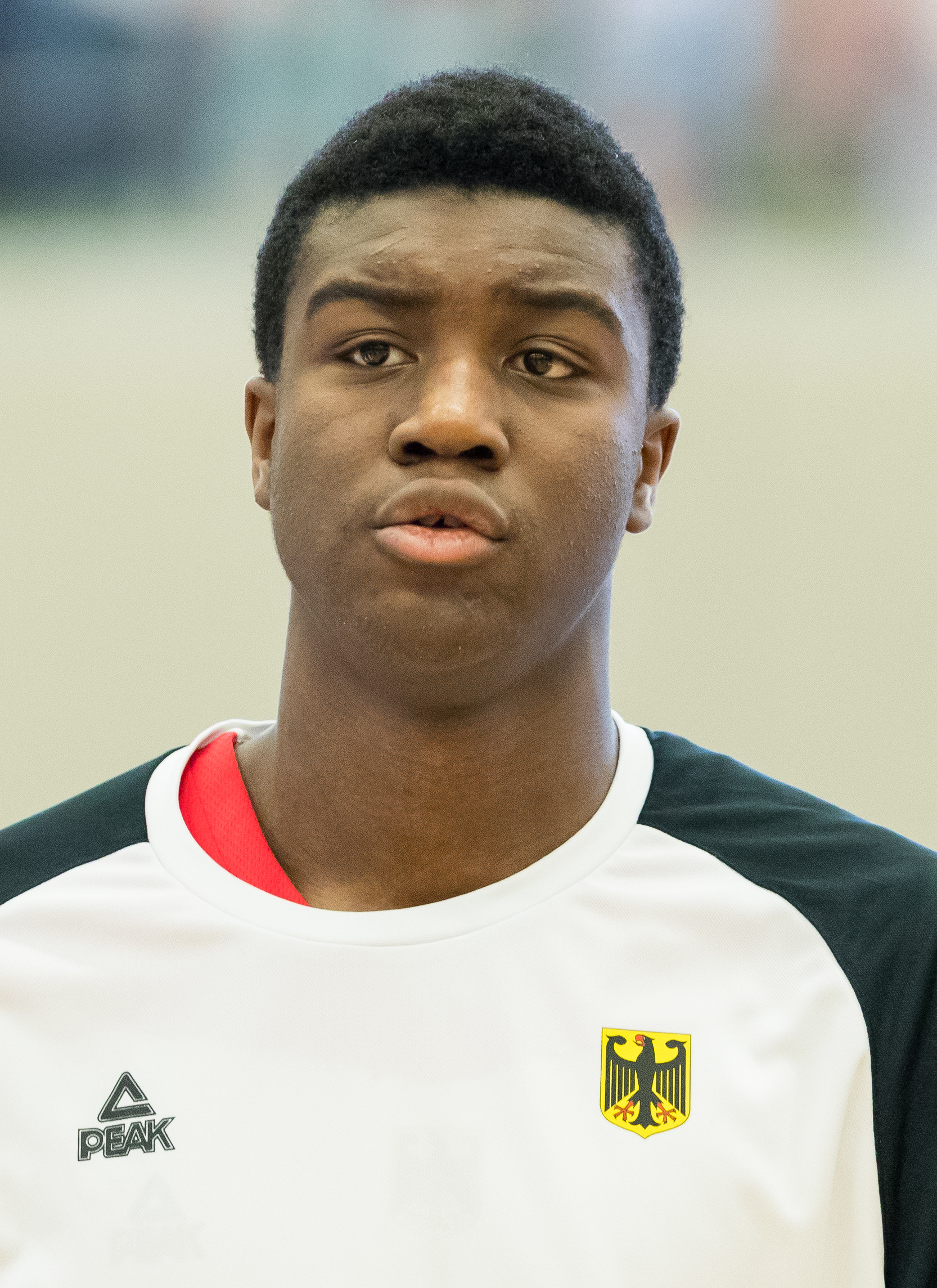
- Hukporti with Germany in 2018

No. 55 – Philadelphia 76ers
- Position: Center
- League: NBA

Personal information
- Born: 12 April 2002 (age 24) Stralsund, Germany
- Listed height: 7 ft 0 in (2.13 m)
- Listed weight: 246 lb (112 kg)

Career information
- NBA draft: 2024: 2nd round, 58th overall pick
- Drafted by: Dallas Mavericks
- Playing career: 2018–present

Career history
- 2018–2020: Riesen Ludwigsburg
- 2020–2021: Nevėžis Kėdainiai
- 2021–2024: Melbourne United
- 2024: Riesen Ludwigsburg
- 2024–2026: New York Knicks
- 2024–2026: →Westchester Knicks
- 2026–present: Philadelphia 76ers

Career highlights
- NBA champion (2026); NBA Cup champion (2025); NBA G League Winter Showcase Cup champion (2024)
- Stats at NBA.com
- Stats at Basketball Reference
Medals
Men's basketball
Representing Germany
DBB Albert Schweitzer Tournament
Gold medal – first place	2018 Albert Schweitzer Tournament

Ariel Washington Hukporti (born 12 April 2002) is a German professional basketball player for the Philadelphia 76ers of the National Basketball Association (NBA).

== Early life and youth career ==
Hukporti was born in Stralsund, northern Germany to Togolese parents and was raised by a single mother. He grew up playing football as a defender. Hukporti stood 1.80 m (5 ft 11 in) at age nine and started playing basketball when he was 11 years old, in part due to his height. He began playing in the Jugend Basketball Bundesliga, the German U16 league, with USC Freiburg. After one season, he received offers from renowned clubs, including Bayern Munich and Brose Bamberg. He decided to continue his career with Riesen Ludwigsburg and its junior team, Porsche BBA Ludwigsburg.

In December 2018, at the Adidas Next Generation Tournament (ANGT) Valencia, Hukporti averaged 18 points, 15.2 rebounds and 2.5 steals per game for U18 Porsche Ludwigsburg, while leading the event in blocks (1.8 per game) and index rating (26.7). He helped his team to fourth place and was named to the all-tournament team. In 2019, Hukporti was honored as Rookie of the Year and All-Star Game MVP in the Nachwuchs Basketball Bundesliga (NBBL), the German U19 league. He played for U18 Porsche Ludwigsburg at ANGT Munich in February 2020 but did not return to action after suffering a foot injury in his second game. Hukporti was named NBBL MVP for the 2019–20 season after averaging 16.9 points and 9.4 rebounds per game for Porsche BBA Ludwigsburg.

== Professional career ==
=== Riesen Ludwigsburg (2018–2020) ===
On 12 December 2018, Hukporti made his professional debut for Riesen Ludwigsburg, scoring four points in one minute in an 88–76 loss to Banvit at the Basketball Champions League. On 13 January 2019, he debuted in the Basketball Bundesliga (BBL) versus medi Bayreuth. At the NBA All-Star Weekend in Chicago in February 2020, Hukporti was named MVP of the Basketball Without Borders camp. On 11 June 2020, he scored a career-high 10 points along with three rebounds and two blocks in a 103–74 win over Brose Bamberg in the preliminary round of the 2020 BBL Final Tournament. In the 2019–20 season, Hukporti averaged three points and 2.3 rebounds in 7.9 minutes per game.

=== Nevėžis Kėdainiai (2020–2021) ===
On 3 July 2020, Hukporti signed with Nevėžis Kėdainiai of the Lithuanian Basketball League (LKL).

=== Melbourne United (2021–2024) ===
On 28 July 2021, Hukporti signed as a Next Star with Melbourne United of the Australian National Basketball League (NBL).

During the 2022 pre-season, Hukporti ruptured his achilles tendon and was ruled out for the entire 2022–23 NBL season.

On 31 March 2023, Hukporti recommitted to United for the 2023–24 NBL season.

=== Return to Riesen Ludwigsburg (2024) ===
On 1 April 2024, Hukporti signed with Riesen Ludwigsburg for the rest of the 2023–24 Basketball Bundesliga season.

=== New York Knicks (2024–2026) ===
On 27 June 2024, Hukporti was selected with the 58th overall pick by the Dallas Mavericks in the 2024 NBA draft, which was the draft's final pick. On the same day, his draft rights were traded to the New York Knicks in exchange for the rights of Melvin Ajinça. On 8 July 2024, he signed a two-way contract with the Knicks.

Hukporti made his NBA debut on 22 October 2024, in a 132–109 loss to the Boston Celtics and on 4 November, he signed a standard contract with the Knicks. Throughout his rookie season, he was assigned several times to the Westchester Knicks. Hukporti made his first career start on 26 February 2025 against the Philadelphia 76ers, recording eight points, two rebounds, and one block. However, Hukporti suffered a torn meniscus in the game, and was ruled out for 4-6 weeks. He made 25 appearances (including one start) for New York during the 2024–25 NBA season, averaging 1.9 points and 2.0 rebounds.

Hukporti played in 54 games (including five starts) for the Knicks during the 2025–26 season, recording averages of 2.2 points and 2.9 rebounds. In Game 4 of the 2026 NBA Finals, a 29-point comeback win against the San Antonio Spurs, Hukporti played in the first quarter after Karl-Anthony Towns got into foul trouble and had a block on a Dylan Harper layup in a game the Knicks won by one point. In Game 5 of the Finals, Hukporti helped the Knicks win, 94–90, closing out a 4–1 series victory and securing the Knicks' first NBA championship in 53 years.

=== Philadelphia 76ers (2026–present) ===
On 6 July 2026, Hukporti signed a one-year, $3.4 million contract with the Philadelphia 76ers. On 5 October, Hukporti started for Philadelphia in their opening pre-season game against his former team, the New York Knicks. Only five minutes into the game, Hukporti, while guarding Karl-Anthony Towns, suffered a non-contact injury and left the game. The following day, it was confirmed that Hukporti had ruptured his right Achilles tendon, ending his season.

== National team career ==
Hukporti represented Germany at the 2017 FIBA U16 European Championship in Podgorica. He averaged 5.4 points, 8.9 rebounds and 1.4 blocks for the 13th-place team. In April 2018, he won a gold medal with Germany at the Albert Schweitzer Tournament. Later that year, at the FIBA U16 European Championship in Novi Sad, Hukporti averaged 9.6 points and 5.9 rebounds, leading his team to ninth place. He averaged 10.1 points, 6.4 rebounds and 1.6 blocks at the 2019 FIBA U18 European Championship in Volos as his team finished in 11th place.

== Career statistics ==
Legend
GP	Games played	GS	Games started	MPG	Minutes per game
FG%	Field goal percentage	3P%	3-point field goal percentage	FT%	Free throw percentage
RPG	Rebounds per game	APG	Assists per game	SPG	Steals per game
BPG	Blocks per game	PPG	Points per game	**Bold**	Career high
†	Won an NBA championship

=== NBA ===
==== Regular season ====
Year	Team	GP	GS	MPG	FG%	3P%	FT%	RPG	APG	SPG	BPG	PPG
2024–25	New York	25	1	8.7	**.677**	–	.462	2.0	.4	.0	**.6**	1.9
2025–26†	New York	**54**	**5**	**9.2**	.563	**.250**	**.788**	**2.9**	**.5**	**.2**	.5	**2.2**
Career		79	6	9.1	.595	.250	.696	2.7	.5	.1	.5	2.1

==== Playoffs ====
Year	Team	GP	GS	MPG	FG%	3P%	FT%	RPG	APG	SPG	BPG	PPG
2025	New York	3	0	1.7	**1.000**	–	.000	.7	.0	.0	.0	1.3
2026†	New York	**10**	0	**7.6**	.455	.000	**.467**	**3.2**	**.3**	**.2**	**.7**	**1.7**
Career		13	0	6.2	.538	.000	.412	2.6	.2	.2	.5	1.6
