= Abramo Canka =

Italian basketball player (born 2002)

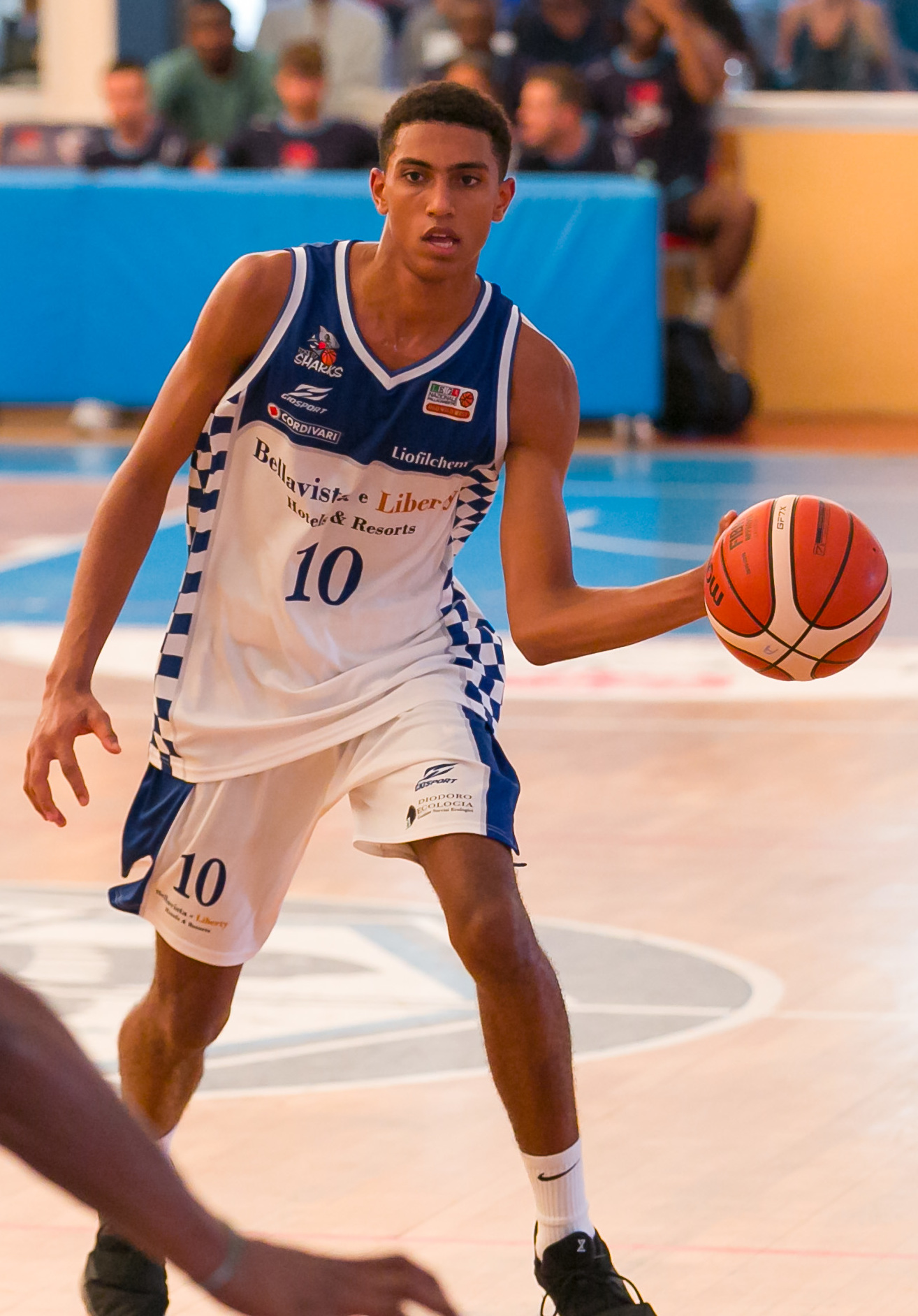
- Canka with Pallacanestro Roseto in 2018

No. 7 – Pallacanestro Trieste
- Position: Shooting guard / small forward
- League: LBA

Personal information
- Born: 18 March 2002 (age 24) Genoa, Italy
- Listed height: 200 cm (6 ft 7 in)
- Listed weight: 90 kg (198 lb)

Career information
- College: UCLA (2022–2023); Wake Forest (2023–2024); Stetson (2024–2025)
- Playing career: 2019–present

Career history
- 2019: Stella Azzurra Roma
- 2019–2020: Pallacanestro Roseto
- 2020–2022: Lokomotiv Kuban
- 2020–2021: →Nevėžis Kėdainiai
- 2025–2026: Virtus Bologna
- 2026: →Pallacanestro Roseto
- 2026–present: Pallacanestro Trieste

Abramo Canka (born Abramo Penè; 18 March 2002) is an Italian professional basketball player for Pallacanestro Trieste of the Lega Basket Serie A (LBA). He played three seasons of college basketball between 2022 and 2025, the first with the UCLA Bruins, the second with the Wake Forest Demon Deacons, and the third with the Stetson Hatters.

== Early life and youth career ==
Born in Genoa, Italy, to a Senegalese father and a Kosovo Albanian mother, Canka grew up playing basketball for Tigullio Sport Team Ligure. In 2016, he joined the youth academy of Serie B club Stella Azzurra Roma. In 2018, Canka joined the Roseto Sharks youth program.

In January 2020, Canka played for Stella Azzurra's under-18 team at the Adidas Next Generation Tournament in Munich, where he helped the team reach the final and was named to the all-tournament team. He averaged 16.8 points, 4.3 rebounds, 4.3 assists and 2.3 steals in four games.

== Professional career ==
Canka started the 2019–20 season with Stella Azzurra Roma in the third-tier Serie B. He made his first and only appearance on 28 September 2019. He joined the Roseto Sharks in the second-tier Serie A2 in October 2019. On 13 October, he recorded a career-high 25 points, shooting 12-of-15 from the field, along with nine rebounds, five assists and five steals in a 113–112 double-overtime win over JuveCaserta. He averaged 7.8 points, 4.1 rebounds, 1.8 assists and 1.6 steals in 18 games for Roseto in 2019–20.

On 27 June 2020, Canka signed with Lokomotiv Kuban of the Russian VTB United League. Six days later, he was loaned to Nevėžis Kėdainiai of the Lithuanian Basketball League (LKL). In 17 games in 2020–21, he averaged 7.0 points, 3.4 rebounds and 1.1 assists per game.

Canka started the 2021–22 season with Nevėžis Kėdainiai and averaged 7.9 points, 3.7 rebounds, 1.2 assists and 1.2 steals in nine games. He returned to Lokomotiv Kuban on 3 December 2021. To finish the 2021–22 season, he played one game for Lokomotiv in the VTB United League and 16 games for Lokomotiv's reserves team in the Russian Basketball Super League 1.

On 15 July 2025, Canka signed with Virtus Bologna of the Lega Basket Serie A (LBA) and the EuroLeague. He missed the start of the 2025–26 season due to injury. He appeared in just one Italian League game for Virtus before being sent on loan to Pallacanestro Roseto of Serie A2 on 9 February 2026 for the rest of the season.

On 7 August 2026, Canka signed with Pallacanestro Trieste of the LBA.

== College career ==
In August 2022, Canka moved to the United States to play college basketball for the UCLA Bruins, whose assistant coach Ivo Simović had strong connections to the international community. As a freshman in 2022–23, Canka played in 22 games and averaged 1.5 points in 5.4 minutes per game. He shot 44% overall and 50% on 3-pointers (5 of 10), but struggled at times defensively, not uncommon for youngsters in coach Mick Cronin's complex defense.

In May 2023, Canka transferred to Wake Forest, who had recruited him before he chose UCLA. In 15 games for the Demon Deacons in 2023–24, he scored a total of seven points in 3.3 minutes per game.

In June 2024, Canka transferred to Stetson. In 26 games for the Hatters in 2024–25, he made 21 starts and averaged 8.7 points, 4.5 rebounds, 1.3 assists and 1.0 steals in 26.0 minutes per game.

== National team career ==
Canka represented Italy at the 2018 FIBA U16 European Championship in Novi Sad, Serbia. In seven games, he averaged 10.6 points, 7.1 rebounds, two assists and 1.9 steals per game, leading his team to 12th place. He also averaged 9.4 points and 2.1 rebounds in the 2022 FIBA U20 European Championship.

== Career statistics ==
Legend
GP	Games played	GS	Games started	MPG	Minutes per game
FG%	Field goal percentage	3P%	3-point field goal percentage	FT%	Free throw percentage
RPG	Rebounds per game	APG	Assists per game	SPG	Steals per game
BPG	Blocks per game	PPG	Points per game	**Bold**	Career high

=== College ===
Year	Team	GP	GS	MPG	FG%	3P%	FT%	RPG	APG	SPG	BPG	PPG
2022–23	UCLA	22	0	5.5	.444	**.500**	**1.000**	.7	.2	.2	.0	1.5
2023–24	Wake Forest	15	0	3.3	.273	.200	—	.3	.1	.0	.0	.5
2024–25	Stetson	**26**	**21**	**26.0**	**.463**	.328	.673	**4.5**	**1.3**	**1.0**	**.5**	**8.7**
Career		63	21	13.4	.451	.342	.698	2.2	.6	.5	.2	4.2
