= Yannick Nzosa =

Congolese basketball player (born 2003)

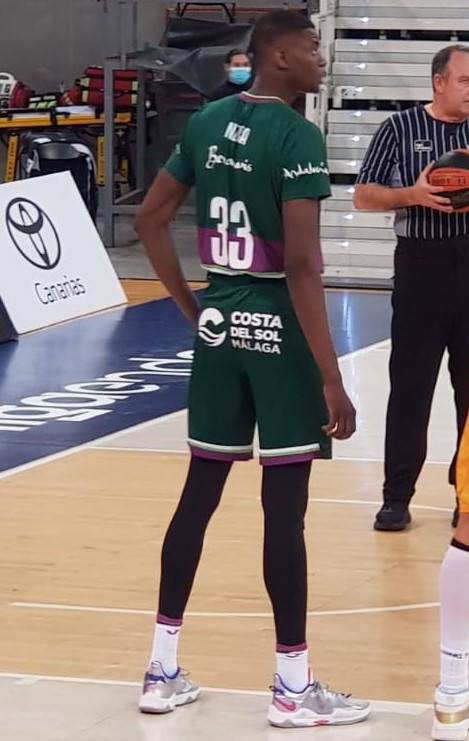
- Nzosa with Unicaja Malaga in 2022

No. 3 – Unicaja Málaga
- Position: Center
- League: Liga ACB; BCL

Personal information
- Born: 15 November 2003 (age 23) Kinshasa, DR Congo
- Listed height: 2.08 m (6 ft 10 in)
- Listed weight: 88.5 kg (195 lb)

Career information
- NBA draft: 2022: 2nd round, 54th overall pick
- Drafted by: Washington Wizards
- Playing career: 2020–present

Career history
- 2020–present: Unicaja Málaga
- 2022–2023: → Coosur Real Betis
- 2023–2024: → Movistar Estudiantes
- 2024–2025: → Fuenlabrada
- 2025–2026: → San Pablo Burgos

Career highlights
- ACB All-Young Players Team (2021)
- Stats at Basketball Reference

Yannick Nzosa Manzila (born 15 November 2003) is a Congolese professional basketball player for Unicaja Málaga of the Liga ACB and the Basketball Champions League (BCL). He was drafted by the Washington Wizards in the second round of the 2022 NBA Draft.

== Early life and youth career ==
Nzosa was born and raised in the suburbs of Kinshasa, Democratic Republic of the Congo. He grew up playing association football as a goalkeeper. At age 12, Nzosa was discovered by a friend of a coach of local club New Generation, with whom he started his basketball career. One year later, he tried to enroll at Canterbury Academy in Las Palmas, Spain, with the help of former player Anicet Lavodrama, but was denied a visa. In 2017, Nzosa began playing for Italian club Stella Azzurra Roma. Teammates Paul Eboua and Jordan Bayehe helped him learn to speak Italian. In February 2019, Nzosa played for Stella Azzurra's under-18 team at the Kaunas Tournament, a qualifier for the Adidas Next Generation Tournament (ANGT), and was named to the all-tournament team.

For the 2019–20 season, Nzosa was loaned to Stella Azzurra's affiliated team, Roseto Sharks of the Serie A2 Basket. On 6 September 2019, he was picked up from his hotel by his mentor, Joe Lolonga, prior to a preseason training session, without the consent of his club to travel to Málaga and join Spanish club Unicaja Málaga. Stella Azzurra filed a police report against Lolonga, who had been unhappy with the club's training of Nzosa, for kidnapping. Nzosa announced on social media that he was moving to Unicaja and denied reports that he had been kidnapped. He trained with Unicaja Andalucía, the reserve team of Unicaja competing in the Liga EBA, but was not allowed to play in professional matches due to a dispute between Unicaja and Stella Azzurra over his rights. In December 2019, he represented the club's under-18 team at the ANGT Valencia Tournament, earning all-tournament team honors.

== Professional career ==
On 31 March 2020, Nzosa signed a five-year contract with Unicaja of the Liga ACB after FIBA Europe ruled in favor of the club in its dispute with Stella Azzurra. The deal included a clause of about €1 million to allow him to leave for the National Basketball Association and the EuroLeague. Stella Azzurra received €25,000 in compensation for his transfer.

In the 2020–21 season, Nzosa joined Unicaja's senior team and immediately became a key player. On 27 September, at 16 years and 10 months of age, he made his Liga ACB debut. In 18 minutes, he recorded 10 points, shooting 5-of-5 from the field, three rebounds and two blocks in an 81–78 win over Andorra. He joined Ricky Rubio and Luka Dončić as the only 16-year-olds in league history to score at least 10 points in a game, while becoming the second-youngest debutant in team history behind Pablo Sánchez. Two days later, Nzosa made his EuroCup debut, going scoreless in nine minutes in a 96–88 win over Metropolitans 92. On 3 October, he scored 10 points on 4-of-4 shooting in a 90–86 loss to Manresa, becoming the first under-18 player to score 10 or more points in their first two ACB games. On 11 October, Nzosa recorded four rebounds, four blocks, three assists, three steals and two points in a 71–66 victory over Valencia. He surpassed Kristaps Porziņģis as the youngest player in league history with least four blocks in a game. On 9 March 2021, Nzosa posted a season-high 16 points and four blocks in a 98–89 loss to AS Monaco. He was named to the ACB All-Young Players Team.

From April 2021, Nzosa was sidelined for five months with athletic pubalgia and was cleared to play by September. His play declined in the 2021–22 season, and he fell from a potential top-five pick to a late-second-round selection in the 2022 NBA draft, according to draft projections. He was selected with the 54th overall pick by the Washington Wizards, while remaining under contract with Unicaja. For the 2022–23 season, Nzosa was loaned to Real Betis Baloncesto.

On 29 August 2024, Nzosa signed with Carplus Fuenlabrada of the Primera FEB on loan from Unicaja.

After a season on loan with San Pablo Burgos, Nzosa returned to the Unicaja roster in July 2026.

== Personal life ==
Nzosa's father works in China, while his mother lives in a village in the Democratic Republic of the Congo. His parents are divorced. He has four sisters and one brother. Nzosa's legal guardian is Joe Lolonga, a family friend and technical director of the Democratic Republic of Congo Basketball Federation. Lolonga facilitated his move to Stella Azzurra in 2017 and has acted as his mentor and manager.

Nzosa speaks French, Lingala, Portuguese, Italian and Spanish, and is learning to speak English. He is in the process of becoming a naturalized Spanish citizen and eligible to play for the national team. He idolizes NBA player Giannis Antetokounmpo.
