= 2023–24 Wake Forest Demon Deacons men's basketball team =

American college basketball season

2023–24 Wake Forest Demon Deacons men's basketball

NIT, Second Round
- Conference: Atlantic Coast Conference
- Record: 21–14 (11–9 ACC)
- Head coach: Steve Forbes (4th season)
- Assistant coaches: BJ McKie; Matt Woodley; Jason Shay
- Home arena: LJVM Coliseum

2023–24 ACC men's basketball standings
	Conf.				Overall
Team	W		L	PCT	W		L	PCT
No. 7 North Carolina	17	–	3	.850	29	–	8	.784
No. 9 Duke	15	–	5	.750	27	–	9	.750
Virginia	13	–	7	.650	23	–	11	.676
Pittsburgh	12	–	8	.600	22	–	11	.667
Wake Forest	11	–	9	.550	21	–	14	.600
No. 14 Clemson	11	–	9	.550	24	–	12	.667
Syracuse	11	–	9	.550	20	–	12	.625
Virginia Tech	10	–	10	.500	19	–	15	.559
Florida State	10	–	10	.500	17	–	16	.515
No. 10 NC State †	9	–	11	.450	26	–	15	.634
Boston College	8	–	12	.400	20	–	16	.556
Notre Dame	7	–	13	.350	13	–	20	.394
Georgia Tech	7	–	13	.350	14	–	18	.438
Miami (FL)	6	–	14	.300	15	–	17	.469
Louisville	3	–	17	.150	8	–	24	.250
† 2024 ACC tournament winner Rankings from AP Poll

The 2023–24 Wake Forest Demon Deacons men's basketball team represented Wake Forest University during the 2023–24 NCAA Division I men's basketball season. The Demon Deacons were led by fourth-year head coach Steve Forbes and played their home games at the Lawrence Joel Veterans Memorial Coliseum in Winston-Salem, North Carolina as members of the Atlantic Coast Conference.

The Demon Deacons started the season 1–1, defeating Elon and losing to Georgia before participating in the Charleston Classic. They ended up in sixth place in the tournament after losing to Utah in the opening round and LSU in overtime in the fifth place game. From there, the Demon Deacons went on a six game winning streak defeating five non-Power 7 foes and Florida in the ACC–SEC Challenge. Their hot streak continued as they won their first three ACC games. The team cooled off and only one two of their next six games with losses against rivals NC State and rivals North Carolina who were ranked third at the time. The team then reversed their fortunes and won five of their next seven games, with the only two losses coming against ninth-ranked Duke and twenty-first ranked Virginia. During that streak, they avenged the rivalry loss to NC State and defeated then eighth-ranked Duke. The team could not carry that momentum through the final four games of the season as they lost three of those games. Their only win came on the final day of the season against Clemson.

The Demon Deacons finished the season 21–14 overall and 11–9 in ACC play to finish in a three-way tie for fifth place. After winning both tiebreakers, they were awarded the fifth seed in the ACC tournament. They received a bye into the Second Round where they defeated twelfth seed Notre Dame, avenging a loss from the regular season. They lost to fourth seed Pittsburgh in the Quarterfinals. They received an at-large bid to the National Invitation Tournament and were a first seed. They defeated Appalachian State in the First Round before losing to fourth-seed Georgia in the Second Round to end their season.

== Previous season ==
The Demon Deacons finished 2022–23 season finished the season 19–14, 10–10 in ACC play to finish in a tie for eighth place. As the ninth seed in the ACC tournament they defeated Syracuse before losing to Miami in the quarterfinals.

== Offseason ==
=== Departures ===
Departures
Name	Number	Pos.	Height	Weight	Year	Hometown	Reason for departure
Lucas Taylor	0	G	6'5"	195	Sophomore	Wake Forest, NC	Transferred to Georgia State
Tyree Appleby	1	G	6'1"	165	GS Senior	Jacksonville, AR	Graduated/signed to play professionally in France with Limoges CSP
Daivien Williamson	4	G	6'1"	180	GS Senior	Winston-Salem, NC	Graduated
Robert McCray	13	G	6'4"	185	Sophomore	Columbia, SC	Transferred to Jacksonville
Davion Bradford	20	F	7'0"	270	Junior	St. Louis, MO	Transferred to New Mexico State
Bobi Klintman	34	F	6'10"	225	Freshman	Malmö, Sweden	Signed to play professionally in Australia with Cairns Taipans
Xiaolong Xu	45	G	6'1"	180	Junior	Beijing, China	Walk-on; not on team roster
Grant van Beveren	52	F	6'6"	215	Senior	Alpharetta, GA	Walk-on; left the team for personal reasons

=== Incoming transfers ===
Incoming transfers
Name	Number	Pos.	Height	Weight	Year	Hometown	Previous school
Kevin Miller	0	G	6'0"	165	Junior	Chicago, IL	Central Michigan
Efton Reid	4	C	7'0"	240	Junior	Richmond, VA	Gonzaga
Abramo Canka	10	G/F	6'6"	200	Sophomore	Genoa, Italy	UCLA
Hunter Sallis	23	G	6'5"	180	Junior	Omaha, NE	Gonzaga

=== 2023 recruiting class ===
College recruiting information
Name	Hometown	School	Height	Weight	Commit date
Aaron Clark #25 SG	Easton, PA	Brewster Academy	6 ft 6 in (1.98 m)	195 lb (88 kg)	Oct 24, 2022
Aaron Clark #25 SG	Recruit ratings: Rivals: 247Sports: ESPN: (82)				
Marqus Marion #47 SF	Skovlunde, Denmark	BMS Herlev	6 ft 8 in (2.03 m)	210 lb (95 kg)	Feb 7, 2023
Marqus Marion #47 SF	Recruit ratings: Rivals: 247Sports: ESPN: (NR)				
Parker Friedrichsen #16 SG	Bixby, OK	Bixby	6 ft 3 in (1.91 m)	195 lb (88 kg)	Feb 20, 2023
Parker Friedrichsen #16 SG	Recruit ratings: Rivals: 247Sports: ESPN: (80)				
Overall recruit ranking:
Note: In many cases, Scout, Rivals, 247Sports, On3, and ESPN may conflict in their listings of height and weight.; In these cases, the average was taken. ESPN grades are on a 100-point scale.; Sources: "Wake Forest Demon Deacons". ESPN.; "2023 Team Ranking". Rivals.

=== 2024 recruiting class ===
College recruiting information (2024)
Name	Hometown	School	Height	Weight	Commit date
Juke Harris #23 SG	Salisbury, NC	Salisbury High School	6 ft 3 in (1.91 m)	185 lb (84 kg)	Mar 24, 2023
Juke Harris #23 SG	Recruit ratings: Rivals: 247Sports: ESPN: (85)				
Overall recruit ranking:
Note: In many cases, Scout, Rivals, 247Sports, On3, and ESPN may conflict in their listings of height and weight.; In these cases, the average was taken. ESPN grades are on a 100-point scale.; Sources: "Wake Forest Demon Deacons". ESPN.; "2024 Team Ranking". Rivals.

== Roster ==
2023–24 Wake Forest Demon Deacons men's basketball team
Players
Coaches

Pos.	#	Name	Height	Weight	Year	Previous school	Hometown
G	0	Boopie Miller	6 ft 0 in (1.83 m)	175 lb (79 kg)	RS So	Victory Rock Prep; Central Michigan	Chicago, IL
F	1	Marqus Marion	6 ft 8 in (2.03 m)	210 lb (95 kg)	Fr	BMS Herlev	Skovlunde, Denmark
G	2	Cameron Hildreth	6 ft 4 in (1.93 m)	195 lb (88 kg)	Jr	Surrey Scorchers	Worthing, England
F/C	4	Efton Reid	7 ft 0 in (2.13 m)	240 lb (109 kg)	Jr	IMG Academy; Gonzaga	Richmond, VA
G	10	Abramo Canka	6 ft 6 in (1.98 m)	200 lb (91 kg)	So	Lokomotiv Kuban; UCLA	Genoa, Italy
F	11	Andrew Carr	6 ft 10 in (2.08 m)	220 lb (100 kg)	Sr	West Chester East; Delaware	West Chester, PA
G	13	Aaron Clark	6 ft 6 in (1.98 m)	195 lb (88 kg)	Fr	Brewster Academy	Easton, PA
G	20	Parker Friedrichsen	6 ft 3 in (1.91 m)	195 lb (88 kg)	Fr	Bixby	Bixby, OK
G	23	Hunter Sallis	6 ft 5 in (1.96 m)	180 lb (82 kg)	Jr	Millard North; Gonzaga	Omaha, NE
F	25	Zach Keller	6 ft 10 in (2.08 m)	228 lb (103 kg)	So	ThunderRidge	Highlands Ranch, CO
G	30	Damari Monsanto	6 ft 6 in (1.98 m)	225 lb (102 kg)	RS Sr	Western; East Tennessee State	Pembroke Pines, FL
G	31	Jao Ituka	6 ft 1 in (1.85 m)	196 lb (89 kg)	Jr	Gaithersburg; Marist	Gaithersburg, MD
C	33	Matthew Marsh	7 ft 1 in (2.16 m)	250 lb (113 kg)	Jr	ASVEL Lyon-Villeurbanne	Cornwall, England
G	40	RJ Kennah (W)	6 ft 5 in (1.96 m)	195 lb (88 kg)	Jr	Kent Denver	Parker, CO
F	45	Vincent Ricchiuti (W)	6 ft 6 in (1.98 m)	195 lb (88 kg)	Fr	St. Augustine	San Diego, CA
G	51	Kevin Dunn (W)	6 ft 2 in (1.88 m)	205 lb (93 kg)	Jr	Choate Rosemary Hall	Winston-Salem, NC
G	52	Will Underwood (W)	6 ft 3 in (1.91 m)	180 lb (82 kg)	Fr	Mahtomedi	Mahtomedi, MN
F	55	Owen Kmety (W)	6 ft 6 in (1.98 m)	180 lb (82 kg)	So	La Lumiere School	Chicago, IL

Head coach

- Steve Forbes (Southern Arkansas University)

Assistant coach(es)

- BJ McKie (South Carolina)
- Matt Woodley (Drake)
- Jason Shay (Western Illinois)

Legend

- (C) Team captain
- (S) Suspended
- (I) Ineligible
- (W) Walk-on
- Injured
- Current redshirt

Roster

== Schedule and results ==
Date time, TV	Rank^{#}	Opponent^{#}	Result	Record	High points	High rebounds	High assists	Site (attendance) city, state
Exhibition
October 29, 2023*; 1:00 p.m.		No. 24 Alabama	W 88–80	–	28 – Hildreth	10 – Carr	2 – Tied	LJVM Coliseum (2,679); Winston-Salem, NC
Non-conference regular season
November 6, 2023*; 8:00 p.m., ACCNX/ESPN+		Elon	W 101–78	1–0	33 – Hildreth	9 – Carr	5 – Hildreth	LJVM Coliseum (6,641); Winston-Salem, NC
November 10, 2023*; 7:00 p.m., SECN		at Georgia	L 77–80	1–1	22 – Miller	8 – Tied	7 – Miller	Stegeman Coliseum (8,176); Athens, GA
November 16, 2023*; 9:00 p.m., ESPNU		vs. Utah; Charleston Classic quarterfinals	L 70–77	1–2	20 – Sallis	6 – Friedrichsen	3 – Miller	TD Arena (2,745); Charleston, SC
November 17, 2023*; 7:00 p.m., ESPNU		vs. Towson; Charleston Classic consolation 2nd round	W 71–61	2–2	25 – Miller	8 – Carr	3 – Tied	TD Arena (3,029); Charleston, SC
November 19, 2023*; 3:00 p.m., ESPN2		vs. LSU; Charleston Classic 5th Place Game	L 80–86 ^{OT}	2–3	22 – Sallis	9 – Tied	8 – Miller	TD Arena (2,753); Charleston, SC
November 24, 2023*; 1:00 p.m., ACCNX/ESPN+		Charleston Southern	W 71–56	3–3	21 – Hildreth	10 – Carr	3 – Tied	LJVM Coliseum (6,702); Winston-Salem, NC
November 29, 2023*; 7:15 p.m., ESPNU		Florida; ACC–SEC Challenge	W 82–71	4–3	24 – Sallis	6 – Tied	4 – Tied	LJVM Coliseum (8,165); Winston-Salem, NC
December 6, 2023*; 6:00 p.m., ACCN		Rutgers	W 76–57	5–3	23 – Miller	14 – Reid III	6 – Hildreth	LJVM Coliseum (7,692); Winston-Salem, NC
December 9, 2023*; 8:00 p.m., ACCN		NJIT	W 83–59	6–3	19 – Friedrichsen	6 – Tied	6 – Miller	LJVM Coliseum (7,224); Winston-Salem, NC
December 18, 2023*; 7:00 p.m., ACCN		Delaware State	W 88–59	7–3	19 – Sallis	11 – Carr	5 – Miller	LJVM Coliseum (6,423); Winston-Salem, NC
December 21, 2023*; 3:00 p.m., ACCNX/ESPN+		Presbyterian	W 91–68	8–3	21 – Carr	9 – Carr	7 – Miller	LJVM Coliseum (6,775); Winston-Salem, NC
ACC regular season
December 30, 2023; 2:00 p.m., ESPN2		Virginia Tech	W 86–63	9–3 (1–0)	20 – Sallis	9 – Sallis	2 – Tied	LJVM Coliseum (10,055); Winston-Salem, NC
January 2, 2024; 7:00 p.m., ACCN		at Boston College	W 84–78	10–3 (2–0)	21 – Sallis	14 – Reid III	7 – Miller	Conte Forum (4,265); Chestnut Hill, MA
January 6, 2024; 2:15 p.m., The CW		Miami (FL)	W 86–82 ^{OT}	11–3 (3–0)	27 – Miller	11 – Reid III	5 – Carr	LJVM Coliseum (8,706); Winston-Salem, NC
January 9, 2023; 7:00 p.m., ACCN		at Florida State	L 82–87	11–4 (3–1)	25 – Hildreth	9 – Reid III	5 – Miller	Donald L. Tucker Civic Center (5,368); Tallahassee, FL
January 13, 2024; 2:00 p.m., ESPN2		Virginia	W 66–47	12–4 (4–1)	21 – Sallis	12 – Carr	7 – Miller	LJVM Coliseum (9,855); Winston-Salem, NC
January 16, 2024; 7:00 p.m., ACCN		at NC State; Rivalry	L 76–83	12–5 (4–2)	28 – Carr	7 – Tied	4 – MIller	PNC Arena (13,836); Raleigh, NC
January 20, 2024; 12:00 p.m., ESPNU		Louisville	W 90–65	13–5 (5–2)	19 – Sallis	11 – Hildreth	6 – Hildreth	LJVM Coliseum (9,261); Winston-Salem, NC
January 22, 2024; 7:00 p.m., ESPN		at No. 3 North Carolina; Rivalry	L 64–85	13–6 (5–3)	14 – Carr	7 – Tied	1 – Tied	Dean Smith Center (21,175); Chapel Hill, NC
January 31, 2024; 7:00 p.m., ACCN		at Pittsburgh	L 72–77	13–7 (5–4)	22 – Sallis	10 – Reid III	3 – Sallis	Petersen Events Center (7,769); Pittsburgh, PA
February 3, 2023; 7:45 p.m., The CW		Syracuse	W 99–70	14–7 (6–4)	24 – Sallis	12 – Hildreth	5 – Sallis	LJVM Coliseum (11,412); Winston-Salem, NC
February 6, 2024; 7:00 p.m., ESPNU		at Georgia Tech	W 80–51	15–7 (7–4)	17 – Hildreth	10 – Carr	4 – Hildreth	McCamish Pavilion (4,239); Atlanta, GA
February 10, 2024; 4:00 p.m., ACCN		NC State; Rivalry	W 83–79	16–7 (8–4)	33 – Sallis	7 – Carr	6 – Miller	LJVM Coliseum (12,571); Winston-Salem, NC
February 12, 2024; 7:00 p.m., ESPN		at No. 9 Duke	L 69–77	16–8 (8–5)	22 – Sallis	7 – Miller	4 – Sallis	Cameron Indoor Stadium (9,314); Durham, NC
February 17, 2024; 12:00 p.m., ESPN2		at No. 21 Virginia	L 47–49	16–9 (8–6)	12 – Sallis	12 – Reid III	4 – Hildreth	John Paul Jones Arena (14,637); Charlottesville, VA
February 20, 2024; 9:00 p.m., ACCN		Pittsburgh	W 91–58	17–9 (9–6)	18 – Miller	8 – Carr	5 – Tied	LJVM Coliseum (7,448); Winston-Salem, NC
February 24, 2024; 2:00 p.m., ESPN		No. 8 Duke	W 83–79	18–9 (10–6)	29 – Sallis	6 – Sallis	5 – Miller	LJVM Coliseum (14,744); Winston-Salem, NC
February 27, 2024; 9:00 p.m., ACCN		at Notre Dame	L 65–70	18–10 (10–7)	16 – Miller	10 – Reid III	5 – Miller	Joyce Center (4,698); South Bend, IN
March 2, 2023; 5:30 p.m., The CW		at Virginia Tech	L 76–87	18–11 (10–8)	21 – Miller	9 – Reid III	6 – Miller	Cassell Coliseum (8,925); Blacksburg, VA
March 5, 2024; 9:00 p.m., ACCN		Georgia Tech	L 69–70	18–12 (10–9)	22 – Sallis	6 – Reid III	3 – Sallis	LVJM Coliseum (7,481); Winston-Salem, NC
March 9, 2024; 6:00 p.m., ACCN		Clemson	W 81–76	19–12 (11–9)	22 – Sallis	7 – Tied	4 – Sallis	LJVM Coliseum (12,288); Winston-Salem, NC
ACC tournament
March 13, 2024; 2:30 p.m., ESPN	(5)	vs. (12) Notre Dame; Second Round	W 72–59	20–12	17 – Miller	11 – Carr	5 – Reid III	Capital One Arena (9,920); Washington, D.C.
March 14, 2024; 2:30 p.m., ESPN2	(5)	vs. (4) Pittsburgh; Quarterfinals	L 69–81	20–13	23 – Hildreth	9 – Carr	4 – Sallis	Capital One Arena (14,920); Washington, D.C.
NIT
March 20, 2024; 8:00 p.m., ESPN+	(1)	Appalachian State; First Round - Wake Forest Bracket	W 87–76	21–13	31 – Miller	12 – Reid III	3 – Tied	LJVM Coliseum (6,733); Winston-Salem, NC
March 24, 2024; 4:00 p.m., ESPN2	(1)	(4) Georgia; Second Round - Wake Forest Bracket	L 66–72	21–14	31 – Carr	11 – Carr	3 – Reid III	LJVM Coliseum (4,772); Winston-Salem, NC
*Non-conference game. ^{#}Rankings from AP Poll. (#) Tournament seedings in parentheses. All times are in Eastern Time.

== Rankings ==
Ranking movements Legend: ██ Increase in ranking ██ Decrease in ranking — = Not ranked RV = Received votes
	Week																				
Poll	Pre	1	2	3	4	5	6	7	8	9	10	11	12	13	14	15	16	17	18	19	Final
AP	—	—	—	—	—	—	—	—	—	RV	—	—	—	—	—	—	RV	—	RV	—	—
Coaches	—	—	—	—	—	—	—	—	—	RV	—	—	—	—	RV	—	RV	RV	—	—	—

*AP does not release post-NCAA tournament rankings
^Coaches did not release a Week 2 poll.
