= Boopie Miller =

American basketball player (born 2003)

No. 2 – Grand Rapids Gold
- Position: Point guard
- League: NBA G League

Personal information
- Born: May 1, 2003 (age 23) Chicago, Illinois, U.S.
- Listed height: 6 ft 0 in (1.83 m)
- Listed weight: 175 lb (79 kg)

Career information
- High school: Victory Rock Prep (Bradenton, Florida)
- College: Central Michigan (2021–2023); Wake Forest (2023–2024); SMU (2024–2026)
- NBA draft: 2026: undrafted
- Playing career: 2026–present

Career history
- 2026–present: Grand Rapids Gold

Career highlights
- Second-team All-ACC (2026); Third-team All-ACC (2025)
- Stats at NBA.com
- Stats at Basketball Reference

Kevin "Boopie" Miller (born May 1, 2003) is an American professional basketball player for the Grand Rapids Gold of the NBA G League. He played college basketball for the Central Michigan Chippewas, Wake Forest Demon Deacons, and SMU Mustangs.

== Early life and college career ==
Miller attended Victory Rock Prep in Bradenton, Florida, before committing to play college basketball at Central Michigan University. As a true freshman for Central Michigan, he averaged 13.1 points, 4.6 assists, and 3.4 rebounds per game, being named to the MAC All-Freshman Team. After playing sparingly the following season due to injury, Miller transferred to Wake Forest University. He finished his redshirt sophomore season averaging 15.6 points and 3.5 assists per game, before entering the transfer portal for a second time.

In April 2024, Miller announced his decision to transfer to Southern Methodist University. In his first season with the Mustangs, he averaged 13.2 points, 5.5 assists, and 1.6 steals per game, being named to the third-team All-ACC. The following season, Miller was named the Associated Press national player of the week after totaling 27 points, 12 assists, and four rebounds in an upset victory over North Carolina. Against Virginia Tech, he hit a game-winning half-court shot as time expired to lead the Mustangs to a 77–76 victory. At the conclusion of the regular season, he was named to the second-team All-ACC after emerging as one of the conference's leading scorers and assisters.

Miller surpassed the 2,000 career point milestone in his final college game, an 89–79 loss to Miami (Ohio) in the 2026 NCAA tournament First Four.

== Professional career ==
After going unselected in the 2026 NBA draft, Miller signed an Exhibit 10 contract with the Denver Nuggets on September 22, 2026. Miller subsequently signed with the Grand Rapids Gold of the NBA G League.

== Career statistics ==
Legend
GP	Games played	GS	Games started	MPG	Minutes per game
FG%	Field goal percentage	3P%	3-point field goal percentage	FT%	Free throw percentage
RPG	Rebounds per game	APG	Assists per game	SPG	Steals per game
BPG	Blocks per game	PPG	Points per game	**Bold**	Career high

=== College ===
Year	Team	GP	GS	MPG	FG%	3P%	FT%	RPG	APG	SPG	BPG	PPG
2021–22	Central Michigan	30	28	32.9	.421	.360	.779	3.4	4.6	1.1	.1	13.1
2022–23	Central Michigan	4	4	35.0	.519	.375	.773	3.8	5.3	.8	.0	18.5
2023–24	Wake Forest	35	35	32.0	.464	.369	.845	2.8	3.5	1.4	.0	15.6
2024–25	SMU	28	28	29.2	.415	.341	.816	3.8	6.4	1.6	.3	19.1

== Personal life ==
Miller is nicknamed "Boopie" in honor of his deceased uncle who went by the name "Boobie".
