= Cristian Fedrigo =

Italian basketball coach

- Fedrigo in 2025

Virtus Bologna
- Position: Assistant coach
- League: LBA; EuroLeague

Personal information
- Born: 23 October 1970 (age 56) Jesolo, Italy
- Coaching career: 2001–present

Career history

Coaching
- 2001–2002: Benetton Treviso (assistant)
- 2007–2008: Vicenza
- 2008–present: Virtus Bologna (assistant)

Career highlights
- As assistant coach: EuroCup champion (2022); FIBA Champions League champion (2019); FIBA EuroChallenge (2009); 3x Italian League champion (2001, 2021, 2025); 3x Italian Supercup winner (2021, 2022, 2023); Italian 2nd Division champion (2017); Italian LNP Cup winner (2017)

Cristian Fedrigo (born October 23, 1970) is an Italian professional basketball coach who is the assistant coach of Virtus Bologna of the Italian Lega Basket Serie A and the Euroleague.

== Biography ==
Fedrigo was born in Jesolo in 1970, and began his coaching career in his hometown in 1990. From 1994 to 2004, he coached in the youth academy of Benetton Treviso, working his way up from minibasketball to become head coach of the junior team. During the 2001–02 season, under head coach Mike D'Antoni, he was part of the first-team coaching staff, helping the team reach the 2002 EuroLeague Final Four in Bologna and win the Italian League championship.

In 2005, Fedrigo joined Vicenza as head of its youth academy. During the 2007–08 season, he served as head coach of Vicenza in Serie C1, leading the team to the promotion playoffs final for a place in Serie B2.

Since 1998, he has also worked in various roles, including assistant coach, head coach and scout, for the Italian Basketball Federation's national teams programme. As an assistant coach, he participated in the 2001 FIBA Europe Under-16 Championship in Madrid and the 2004 FIBA Europe Under-18 Championship in Zaragoza.

Fedrigo joined Virtus Bologna during the 2008–09 season as an assistant coach of the senior men's first team, a position he continues to hold. During his tenure with the club, he has contributed to winning several major trophies, including the FIBA EuroChallenge in 2009, the FIBA Basketball Champions League in 2019, the Italian League championships in 2021 and 2025, and the EuroCup in 2022.
