= Serie A2 =

Serie A2 may refer to:

- Serie A2 (basketball), the second level of men's professional basketball in Italy
- Serie A2 (women's basketball), the second level of women's professional basketball in Italy
- Serie A2 (baseball), the top-level minor baseball league in Italy
- Serie A2 (football), the second level of the football league system in San Marino 1986–1996
- Serie A2 (ice hockey), the second level of ice hockey in Italy
- Serie A2 (men's water polo), the second level of men's water polo in Italy
- Campeonato Brasileiro de Futebol Feminino Série A2, the second level of the women's football league system in Brazil
- Campeonato Paulista Série A2, the second level of the men's football league system of São Paulo state
