= Batin Tuna =

Kosovan-Turkish basketball player

No. 7 – Kipaş İstiklal
- Position: Small forward
- League: TBL

Personal information
- Born: January 4, 2003 (age 23) Bursa, Turkey
- Listed height: 1.98 m (6 ft 6 in)

Career information
- Playing career: 2019–present

Career history
- 2019–2020: Tofaş
- 2020: Gemlik
- 2020–2021: Tofaş
- 2021–2023: Gemlik
- 2023–2024: Tofaş
- 2024–2026: Trepça
- 2026–present: Kipaş İstiklal

Career highlights
- Kosovo Superleague champion (2025); 2x Kosovo Cup winner (2025, 2026); Kosovo Supercup winner (2024)
Medals
Men's basketball
Representing Turkey
FIBA U16 European Championship
Bronze medal – third place	2018 Serbia	Under-16

Batin Tuna (born January 4, 2003) is a Kosovan-Turkish professional basketball player for Kipaş İstiklal of the Türkiye Basketbol Ligi (TBL). He represented Turkey from the under-16 until the under-20 junior categories, but after an agreement between the Turkish Basketball Federation and the Basketball Federation of Kosovo in 2024, he elected to represent Kosovo on the senior level. He also has Albanian origins.

== Professional Career ==
=== Trepça (2024–2026) ===
On July 7, 2024, Tuna signed for Trepça of the Kosovo Superleague and Liga Unike.
