= Davide Casarin =

Italian basketball player (born 2003)

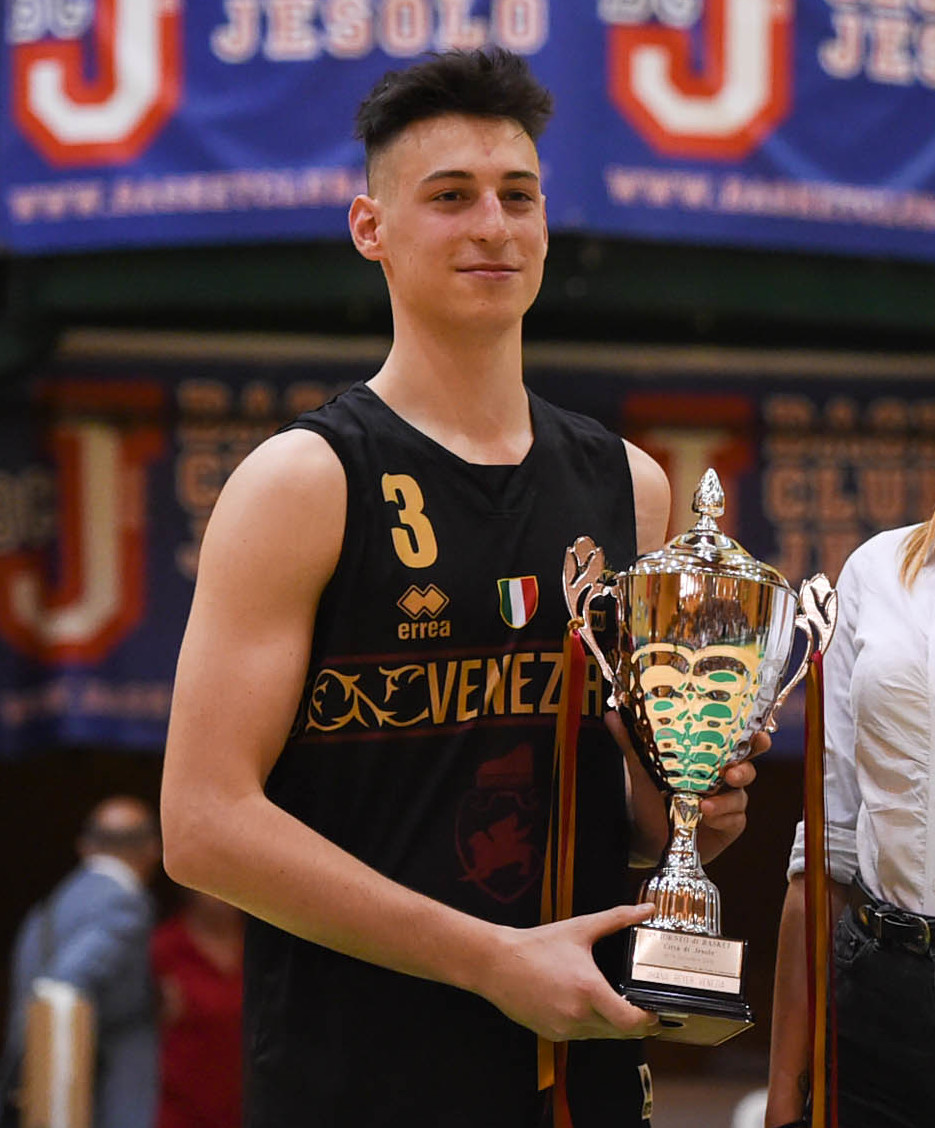

No. 7 – Virtus Bologna
- Position: Small forward / shooting guard
- League: LBA; EuroLeague

Personal information
- Born: 22 May 2003 (age 23) Mestre, Venice, Italy
- Listed height: 1.96 m (6 ft 5 in)
- Listed weight: 86 kg (190 lb)

Career information
- Playing career: 2019–present

Career history
- 2019–2021: Reyer Venezia
- 2021–2022: Universo Treviso Basket
- 2022–2023: Scagliera Verona
- 2023–2025: Umana Reyer Venezia
- 2025–2026: Vanoli Cremona
- 2026–present: Virtus Bologna

Career highlights
- Italian League champion (2019); Italian Cup winner (2020); Lega Serie A Most Improved Player (2026); LBA Next Gen Cup MVP (2020)
Medals
Men's basketball
Representing Italy
FIBA U16 European Championship
Bronze medal – third place	2019 Italy	Team

Davide Casarin (born 22 May 2003) is an Italian professional basketball player for Virtus Bologna of the Italian Lega Basket Serie A (LBA) and the EuroLeague. Standing at 1.96 m (6 ft 5 in), he usually plays the small forward and shooting guard positions.

== Early career ==
Casarin started playing basketball at four years old.

He played with the Reyer Venezia under-18 team at the 2019 Adidas Next Generation Tournament Belgrade, where he was named to the All-Tournament Team despite being two years younger than his competition. In four games, he put up averages of 18.3 points, 4.3 rebounds, 4.8 assists, 2.3 steals and 1.0 blocks per contest.

Casarin was selected to play in the second-annual Adidas International U16 All-Star Game held during the 2019 EuroLeague Final Four in May. After leading Team Europe to a 97–85 victory over Team Asia with 22 points, eight rebounds and five assists, he was named MVP of the game.

At the 2020 Adidas Next Generation Tournament Kaunas, he averaged 17.5 points, 5.8 rebounds, 3.8 assists, 3.8 steals and 1.5 blocks per game while Reyer Venezia finished in sixth place. A few days later, he was named Finals MVP of the Lega Basket Next Gen Cup, a domestic cup competition for U18 teams, after recording 22 points, 17 rebounds and six assists in the final against Pallacanestro Reggiana.

== Professional career ==
He made his professional debut in Lega Basket Serie A on 12 May 2019, coming off the bench during a win against Brescia Leonessa. The 15-year-old scored two points in three minutes. He also played two home playoff games against Trento that postseason.

He was officially promoted to the senior team ahead of the 2019–20 season, although he continued to split time with the under-18 team. He made his EuroCup debut on 1 October, playing two minutes in a 66–63 defeat to KK Partizan in round one. At the age of 16, he became the youngest player in team history to play in a European competition, as well as the 17th youngest player in EuroCup history. In round 10, he recorded four points, one rebound, three assists, one steal and one block against Rytas Vilnius.

On 24 June 2020 the team announced he was returning for an additional year.

On 2 July 2021 Casarin was sent on loan to Treviso for two years. On 14 January 2022 he signed with Scagliera Verona.

On 22 June 2023 he signed with Umana Reyer Venezia of the Italian Serie A.

On 31 July 2025 he signed with Vanoli Cremona of the Italian Lega Basket Serie A (LBA).

== National team career ==
=== Junior national teams ===
Casarin's first international experience was with the national under-14 team in 2017. He played with the national under-15 team at the Trofeo dell'Amicizia in Troyes in 2018. That same year, he was named MVP of the U16 Torneo Villa de Íscar in Spain after scoring a game-high 15 points in the championship game win over the host team. He also played at the 2019 Bellegarde sur Valserine U16 International Tournament in Bellegarde-sur-Valserine, France.

Casarin averaged 8.8 points, 2.5 rebounds, 2.3 assists and 1.5 steals across four games at the 2019 FIBA U18 European Championship in Volos, Greece. He then played at the 2019 FIBA U16 European Championship on home soil, leading Italy to a bronze medal after averaging 15.5 points, 5.3 rebounds, 4.2 assists and 1.2 steals per game. It was Italy's first medal at the competition since 1991, and also meant they would qualify for the Under-17 World Cup in 2020 for their first appearance since 2014.

=== Senior national team ===
In his senior national team debut on 26 February 2023, Casarin scored 10 points and got 2 steals in 11 minutes in a 72–68 victory over Spain in the 2023 FIBA Basketball World Cup qualification.

== Personal life ==
His father, Federico, was also a professional basketball player. He played for Basket Mestre, Pallacanestro Treviso, Virtus Roma, Aurora Desio and Dinamo Sassari. He was appointed president of Reyer Venezia by team owner Luigi Brugnaro in 2017, after previously holding the title of sporting director.

His older brother, Andrea, played professionally as well.
