= Christos Kafezas =

Greek basketball player

Free agent
- Position: Point guard / shooting guard

Personal information
- Born: January 9, 2002 (age 24) Greece
- Listed height: 6 ft 2.5 in (1.89 m)
- Listed weight: 172 lb (78 kg)

Career information
- Playing career: 2019–present

Career history
- 2019–2020: Promitheas Patras
- 2020–2021: Triton Sepolia
- 2021–2022: Achagia 82
- 2022–2023: Agrinio
- 2023–2024: Apollon Patras

Christos Kafezas (Greek: Χρήστος Καφέζας; born January 9, 2002) is a Greek professional basketball player. He is a 1.89 m (6 ft 2 1/2 in) tall combo guard.

== Professional career ==
In June 2019, Kafezas began his pro career with the Greek Basket League club Promitheas Patras, in a game against Panathinaikos, becoming the first ever player born in Patras to play in a Greek Finals Game during the 2018–19 season. In October 2019, he made his debut in one of the two European-wide secondary level competitions, the EuroCup, in a game against Maccabi Rishon LeZion, during the 2019–20 season.

On July 25, 2023, Kafezas returned to Patras for Apollon, where he appeared in 17 league games.
