= Cameron Hildreth =

British basketball player

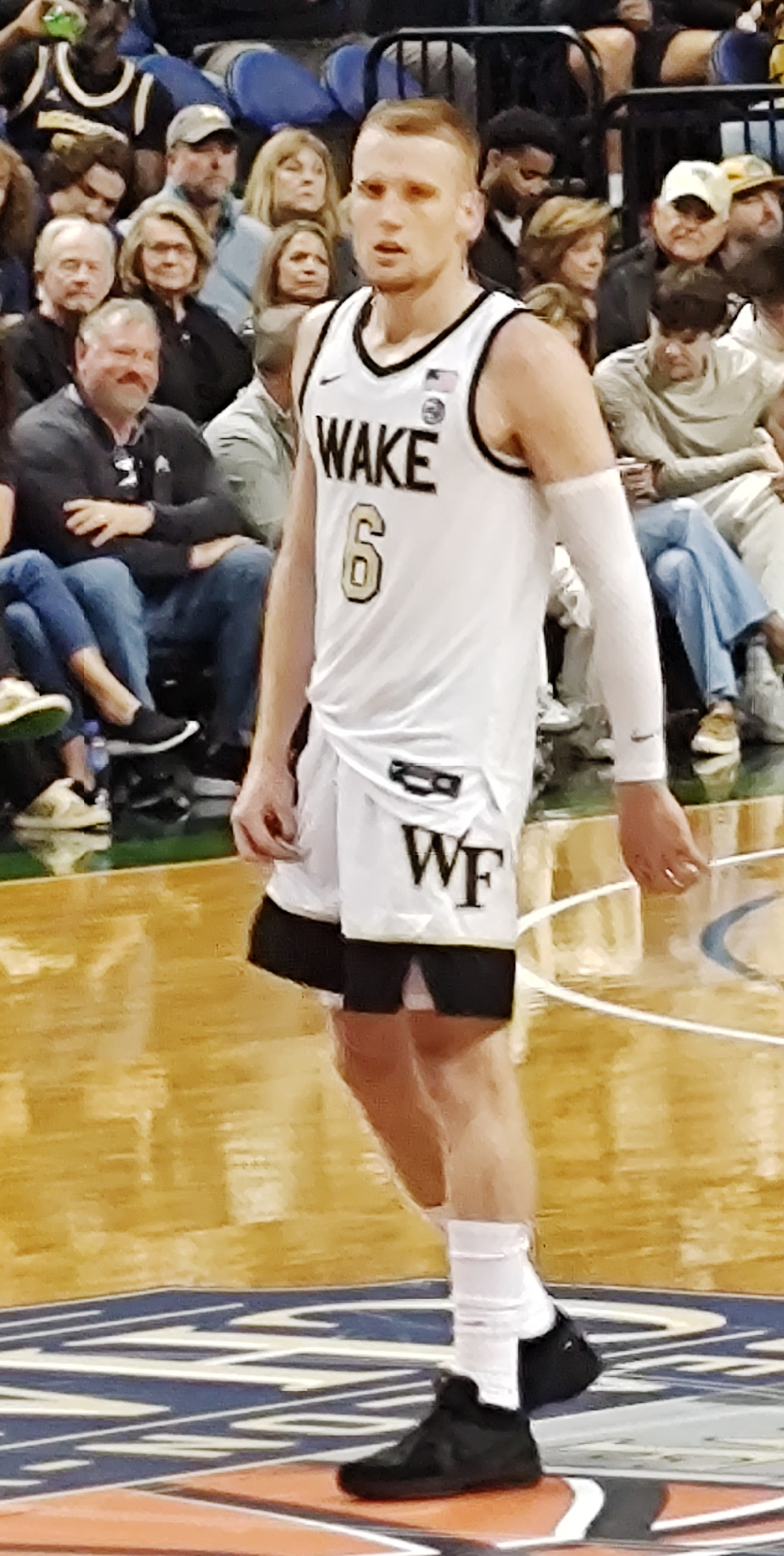

No. 6 – Noblesville Boom
- Position: Shooting guard
- League: NBA G League

Personal information
- Born: September 18, 2002 (age 24) Worthing, England
- Listed height: 6 ft 4 in (1.93 m)
- Listed weight: 195 lb (88 kg)

Career information
- High school: Barking Abbey School (Barking, London)
- College: Wake Forest (2021–2025)
- NBA draft: 2025: undrafted
- Playing career: 2021–present

Career history
- 2025–2026: Noblesville Boom
- 2026: Bàsquet Girona
- 2026–present: Noblesville Boom
- Stats at Basketball Reference

Cameron Hildreth (born September 18, 2002) is a British professional basketball player for the Noblesville Boom of the NBA G League. He played college basketball for the Wake Forest Demon Deacons.

== Early life ==
Rated a four-star recruit, Hildreth attended Holy Trinity School in Crawley, Sussex where he earned All-Tournament team honors at the Adidas Next Generation Tournament having been invited to play on the Barking Abbey team from London.

Cameron was mainly coached by his father Daniel Hildreth, who played professionally in the British Basketball League (BBL) for the Worthing Thunder

== College career ==
On September 24, 2020, Hildreth committed to Wake Forest. As a freshman, Hildreth appeared in 32 games and averaged 3.9 points and 1.2 assist per game. On November 29, 2022, Hildreth scored 15 points and 7 rebounds in a 78–75 win over Wisconsin. On December 20, 2022, Hildreth scored 16 points and 9 rebounds in an 81–70 victory against in-state rival Duke. On January 7, 2023, Hildreth put up 19 points, 8 rebounds and 2 assist in an 80–72 win over Louisville. On January 11, 2023, Hildreth scored 23 points, 6 rebounds and 4 assists in a 90–75 victory against Florida State. On January 14, 2023, Hildreth scored 20 points and 6 assists in an 85–63 win against Boston College. On January 17, 2023, Hildreth scored his first career double-double of 17 points and 10 rebounds in an 87–77 victory over Clemson. On the season, Hidreth averaged 12.4 points, 5.3 rebounds and 2.8 assist per game. On November 6, 2023, Hildreth scored 33 points and 6 rebounds in a 101–78 victory over Elon. On November 29, 2023, Hildreth scored 18 points and 6 rebounds in an 82–71 win against Florida. On January 6, 2024, Hildreth scored 23 points and 3 assist in an 86–82 win over Miami. On February 10, 2025, Hildreth earned Atlantic Coast Conference (ACC) Co-Player of the week honors.

== Professional career ==
On November 5, 2025, the Noblesville Boom announced Hildreth would be on the 2025-2026 roster.

On March 31, 2026, he signed for Bàsquet Girona of the Spanish Liga ACB.

== Career statistics ==
Legend
GP	Games played	GS	Games started	MPG	Minutes per game
FG%	Field goal percentage	3P%	3-point field goal percentage	FT%	Free throw percentage
RPG	Rebounds per game	APG	Assists per game	SPG	Steals per game
BPG	Blocks per game	PPG	Points per game	**Bold**	Career high

=== College ===
Year	Team	GP	GS	MPG	FG%	3P%	FT%	RPG	APG	SPG	BPG	PPG
2021–22	Wake Forest	32	0	13.3	**.564**	.263	.708	2.0	.6	.6	.2	4.3
2022–23	Wake Forest	**37**	0	16.8	.466	.256	.780	2.2	1.4	.6	.2	12.4
2023–24	Wake Forest	34	34	**35.4**	.487	**.405**	**.783**	**4.1**	**2.5**	**1.1**	**.6**	**13.8**
Career		103	34	21.9	.494	.368	.772	2.7	1.5	.8	.3	8.9
