= Terrence Shannon Jr. =

American basketball player (born 2000)

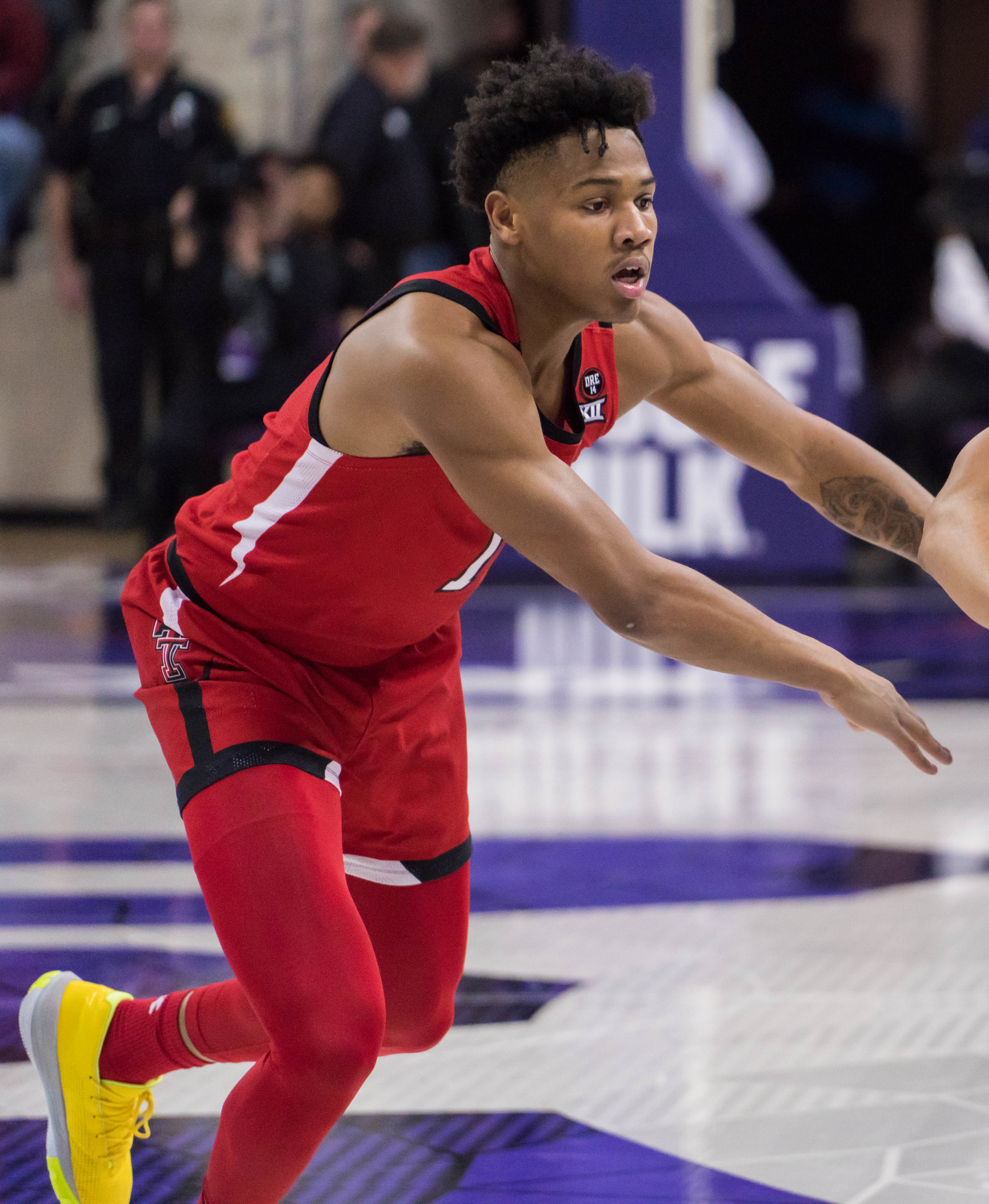
- Shannon with Texas Tech in 2020

No. 4 – Minnesota Timberwolves
- Position: Small forward / shooting guard
- League: NBA

Personal information
- Born: July 30, 2000 (age 25) Chicago, Illinois, U.S.
- Listed height: 6 ft 6 in (1.98 m)
- Listed weight: 215 lb (98 kg)

Career information
- High school: Lincoln Park (Chicago, Illinois); IMG Academy (Bradenton, Florida)
- College: Texas Tech (2019–2022); Illinois (2022–2024)
- NBA draft: 2024: 1st round, 27th overall pick
- Drafted by: Minnesota Timberwolves
- Playing career: 2024–present

Career history
- 2024–present: Minnesota Timberwolves
- 2024–2025: →Iowa Wolves

Career highlights
- Third-team All-American – AP (2024); 2× First-team All-Big Ten – Coaches (2023, 2024); First-team All-Big Ten – Media (2024); Second-team All-Big Ten – Media (2023); Third-team All-Big 12 (2021); Big 12 All-Freshman Team (2020); Big Ten tournament MOP (2024); No. 0 jersey honored by Illinois Fighting Illini
- Stats at NBA.com
- Stats at Basketball Reference

Terrence Edward "T. J." Shannon Jr. (born July 30, 2000), also known by his initials TSJ, is an American professional basketball player for the Minnesota Timberwolves of the National Basketball Association (NBA). He played college basketball for the Texas Tech Red Raiders and the Illinois Fighting Illini.

== Early life ==
Shannon was born to Treanette Redding and Terrence Shannon Sr. His mother and father separated when he was two years old. Shannon has four siblings through his mom and three through his dad.

== High school career ==
Shannon was interested in basketball from a young age, especially after experiencing a growth spurt early in high school. He attended Lincoln Park High School in Chicago, averaging 15 points, 7.5 rebounds and 2.7 assists per game as a senior. Shannon was also a receiver on the school's football team. After having no NCAA Division I basketball scholarship offers by the end of his senior season, he reclassified to the 2019 class and moved to IMG Academy in Bradenton, Florida.

=== Recruiting ===
His success with Mac Irvin Fire on the Amateur Athletic Union circuit drew attention from many college programs. A four-star recruit, he originally committed to DePaul before switching his commitment to Texas Tech. He chose the Red Raiders over offers from DePaul, Florida State, Georgetown and Illinois.

College recruiting
| Name | Hometown | School | Height | Weight | Commit date |
|---|---|---|---|---|---|
| Terrence Shannon Jr. SF | Chicago, IL | IMG Academy (FL) | 6 ft 6 in (1.98 m) | 200 lb (91 kg) | Mar 11, 2019 |
| Terrence Shannon Jr. SF | Recruit ratings: Rivals: 247Sports: ESPN: (83) | | | | |
Overall recruit ranking: Rivals: 62 247Sports: 127 ESPN: 94
Note: In many cases, Scout, Rivals, 247Sports, On3, and ESPN may conflict in their listings of height and weight.; In these cases, the average was taken. ESPN grades are on a 100-point scale.; Sources: "Texas Tech 2019 Basketball Commitments". Rivals.; "2019 Texas Tech Red Raiders Recruiting Class". ESPN.; "2019 Team Ranking". Rivals.

== College career ==
=== Texas Tech ===
==== 2019–20 season ====
Shannon entered his freshman season as one of Texas Tech's starting guards. On December 4, 2019, Shannon recorded a freshman season-high 24 points and eight rebounds in a 65–60 overtime loss to DePaul. As a freshman, he averaged 9.8 points and 4.1 rebounds per game, earning Big 12 Conference All-Freshman Team honors.

==== 2020–21 season ====
Entering his sophomore season, Shannon was named to the Julius Erving Award watch list. On January 30, 2021, Shannon registered his first career double-double with 23 points and 10 rebounds against LSU. Going into the Big 12 tournament, the Red Raiders were 9–8 in the Big 12, good enough to earn the 6-seed. During their quarterfinal matchup against Texas, Shannon played 34 minutes making four three-point field goals in way of an 18-point outing. Despite his performance, Texas Tech was eliminated by a score of 67–66. The Red Raiders were then granted the 6-seed in the South Region of the NCAA tournament. In their Round of 32 matchup against Arkansas, Shannon scored 20 points despite the Red Raiders being eliminated.

As a sophomore, Shannon averaged 12.9 points, four rebounds, 1.4 assists, and 1.1 steals per game. For his efforts, he earned Third-team All-Big 12 honors. On April 8, 2021, Shannon declared for the 2021 NBA draft while maintaining his college eligibility. He ultimately returned to Texas Tech for a third season.

==== 2021–22 season ====
On November 7, Shannon was suspended indefinitely due to an eligibility review. He was reinstated on November 17, after missing three games. As a junior, he averaged 10.4 points, 2.6 rebounds, and two assists per game. On March 25, 2022, Shannon entered the NCAA transfer portal.

=== Illinois ===
==== 2022–23 season ====
On April 29, 2022, he committed to Illinois. After his first season at Illinois, he declared for the 2023 NBA draft and played in the NBA draft combine. He later withdrew from the draft and returned to Illinois for a second and final season.

==== 2023–24 season ====
Shannon played 11 games for the Illini before being suspended for six games, Shannon was considered a front-runner for the National Player of the Year award before his suspension. After a preliminary injunction was granted, his suspension was ended and he resumed playing the rest of the season.

Following the season's end and the not-guilty verdict, it was announced that Shannon's jersey would be honored by the university. His number 0 jersey was unveiled in a halftime ceremony on February 15, 2025, with Shannon in attendance; due to an error by the athletic department, the jersey was initially hung upside down. Making light of the situation, Shannon partnered with Gameday Spirit to release t-shirts referencing the mishap, with a portion of the proceeds going to the local Don Moyer Boys & Girls Club of Champaign.

=== Records ===
==== Big Ten Conference ====
- Big Ten men's basketball tournament single-game record for most points scored: 40 (March 16, 2024)

==== Illinois Fighting Illini ====
- Fighting Illini single-season record for most points scored: 736 (2023–24)
- Fighting Illini single-season record for most free throws made: 212 (2023–24)
- Fighting Illini single-season record for most free throws attempted: 260 (2023–24)
- Fighting Illini single-season record for most offensive win shares: 4.9 (2023–24)
- Fighting Illini single-season record for highest box plus-minus score: 11.6 (2023–24)
- Fighting Illini single-season record for highest offensive box plus-minus score: 9.1 (2023–24)
- Fighting Illini single-game record for most three-point field goals made: 8 (November 18, 2022)
  - Tied with Dee Brown (2005), Trenton Meacham (2006), Brandon Paul (2012), and Alfonso Plummer (2022)

== Professional career ==
On June 26, 2024, Shannon was selected with the 27th overall pick by the Minnesota Timberwolves in the 2024 NBA draft, and on July 8, he signed with Minnesota. Throughout his rookie season, he was assigned to the Iowa Wolves several times. On February 24, 2025, Shannon recorded his first double-double in the NBA, recording 17 points along with 10 rebounds in a 131–128 overtime win against the Oklahoma City Thunder. On February 27, Shannon would score a then career-high 25 points in a 111–102 loss against the Los Angeles Lakers.

On April 8, 2026, Shannon scored a career high 33 points in a 120–132 loss against the Orlando Magic. On April 30, in his first career playoff start, Shannon scored a playoff career-high 24 points in a 110–98 closeout Game 6 victory over the Denver Nuggets in the first round.

== Awards and honors ==
=== NCAA ===
- Illinois Male Athlete of the Year (2024)
- Big Ten Tournament Most Outstanding Player (2024)
- Second-team All-American – 247Sports (2024)
- Third-team All-American – Associated Press (2024)
- First-team All-Big Ten – Associated Press (2024)
- 2× First-team All-Big Ten – Coaches (2023, 2024)
- First-team All-Big Ten – Media (2024)
- Second-team All-Big Ten – Media (2023)
- Third-team All-Big 12 (2021)
- Big 12 All-Freshman Team (2020)
- NCAA East Regional All-Tournament Team (2024)
- Big Ten All-Tournament Team (2024)
- Big 12 All-Tournament Team (2022)

== Career statistics ==
Legend
| GP | Games played | GS | Games started | MPG | Minutes per game |
| FG% | Field goal percentage | 3P% | 3-point field goal percentage | FT% | Free throw percentage |
| RPG | Rebounds per game | APG | Assists per game | SPG | Steals per game |
| BPG | Blocks per game | PPG | Points per game | **Bold** | Career high |

=== NBA ===
==== Regular season ====
| Year | Team | GP | GS | MPG | FG% | 3P% | FT% | RPG | APG | SPG | BPG | PPG |
|---|---|---|---|---|---|---|---|---|---|---|---|---|
| 2024–25 | Minnesota | 32 | 1 | 10.6 | **.482** | .355 | **.810** | **1.5** | **1.0** | .2 | **.2** | 4.3 |
| 2025–26 | Minnesota | **43** | **2** | **12.5** | .450 | **.408** | .800 | 1.1 | .9 | **.3** | .0 | **5.6** |
| Career | | 75 | 3 | 11.7 | .463 | .393 | .802 | 1.3 | .9 | .3 | .1 | 5.1 |

==== Playoffs ====
| Year | Team | GP | GS | MPG | FG% | 3P% | FT% | RPG | APG | SPG | BPG | PPG |
|---|---|---|---|---|---|---|---|---|---|---|---|---|
| 2025 | Minnesota | **9** | 0 | 6.3 | **.481** | **.375** | **1.000** | 1.1 | .3 | **.4** | .0 | 4.6 |
| 2026 | Minnesota | **9** | **3** | **22.6** | .404 | .250 | .917 | **2.6** | **1.3** | **.4** | .0 | **11.8** |
| Career | | 18 | 3 | 14.4 | .421 | .275 | .944 | 1.8 | .8 | .4 | .0 | 8.2 |

=== College ===
| Year | Team | GP | GS | MPG | FG% | 3P% | FT% | RPG | APG | SPG | BPG | PPG |
|---|---|---|---|---|---|---|---|---|---|---|---|---|
| 2019–20 | Texas Tech | 29 | 21 | 23.5 | .470 | .257 | **.829** | 4.1 | 1.0 | .9 | .4 | 9.8 |
| 2020–21 | Texas Tech | 28 | 13 | 26.7 | .448 | .357 | .756 | 4.0 | 1.4 | 1.1 | .1 | 12.9 |
| 2021–22 | Texas Tech | 26 | 20 | 25.0 | .455 | **.384** | .784 | 2.6 | 2.0 | .8 | .2 | 10.4 |
| 2022–23 | Illinois | 31 | 30 | 32.1 | .442 | .321 | .790 | **4.6** | **2.8** | **1.3** | .5 | 17.2 |
| 2023–24 | Illinois | **32** | **31** | **33.9** | **.475** | .362 | .801 | 4.0 | 2.3 | 1.0 | **.9** | **23.0** |
| Career | | 146 | 115 | 28.5 | .459 | .347 | .793 | 3.9 | 1.9 | 1.0 | .4 | 15.0 |

== Personal life ==
=== Rape accusation and acquittal ===
==== Alleged incident ====
In the early morning of Saturday, September 9, 2023 (following the prior day's Kansas–Illinois football game), Shannon allegedly penetrated Madi Neill with his fingers at the Jayhawk Cafe. Months later, on December 27, Shannon was arrested on a warrant issued by the Douglas County (Kansas) District Attorney for the charge of rape; sexual intercourse without consent, and use of force against a victim. Shannon posted bail the following day and was suspended by the team.

No bar employees, security staff, friends, or roommates other than Neill’s best friend were interviewed. The police took surveillance footage from the Jayhawk Cafe, however, the spot where the alleged crime took place occurred off-camera. Neill’s drinking the night of the alleged incident also varied between what she told the police and what was filed in her sexual assault exam report, but the police did not seek receipts to verify. After completing the sexual assault exam the following day, Neill and her friend returned to the Jayhawk Cafe, one night after the alleged incident took place.

Kansas players Kevin McCullar Jr. and Hunter Dickinson, as well as graduate assistant DyShawn Hobson and Illini player Justin Harmon testified that they did not witness Shannon interact with Neill the night of the alleged incident.

Following a series of back-and-forth legal actions between Shannon and the University, on January 19, Shannon was granted a preliminary injunction against the University of Illinois, thus making him eligible to play. The University ultimately dropped its investigation with Shannon dropping his lawsuit as a result.

On May 2, the DNA results were released through a hearing by Shannon's defense. Most of the DNA samples were unusable and one sample contained a mixture of at least three males, none of whom were Shannon.

On June 7, Shannon's defense successfully motioned to include evidence of a third-party incident committed by Arterio Morris, who allegedly sexually assaulted a woman at the Jayhawk Cafe less than two weeks prior to the alleged incident involving Shannon. On June 10, jury selection took place with a jury of eight men and seven women selected to serve as the 12 jurors and three alternates. During the trial, Neill testified that Shannon grabbed her wrist when previously she had said no such grabbing occurred as her hands were occupied by her phone and drink. Neill’s friend corroborated the grabbing, despite not mentioning it in previous testimony. Shannon's defense presented text messages from a group chat between Neill and her friends implying that she may have been motivated by money, as they contained dollar sign emojis. On June 13, Shannon was acquitted on both charges.

==== Aftermath ====
Deputy district attorney Joshua Seiden, who took over the case from Chief Assistant district attorney Jennifer Tatum after she resigned in March, left the office a week following the verdict. On August 6, the Douglas County district attorney, Suzanne Valdez, lost her reelection campaign by finishing third in the Democratic primary election.

On September 13, it was announced that Shannon and his mother were suing the Douglas County district attorney's office and police department for malicious prosecution and other claims. An open-records request from The News-Gazette revealed that Shannon was seeking approximately $11.5 million while his mother was seeking $500,000.
