= 2023–24 Rutgers Scarlet Knights men's basketball team =

American college basketball season

2023–24 Rutgers Scarlet Knights men's basketball
- Conference: Big Ten Conference
- Record: 15–17 (7–13 Big Ten)
- Head coach: Steve Pikiell (8th season)
- Assistant coaches: Brandin Knight; T. J. Thompson; Marlon Williamson
- Home arena: Jersey Mike's Arena

2023–24 Big Ten Conference men's basketball standings
	Conf.				Overall
Team	W		L	PCT	W		L	PCT
No. 2 Purdue	17	–	3	.850	34	–	5	.872
No. 6 Illinois †	14	–	6	.700	29	–	9	.763
Nebraska	12	–	8	.600	23	–	11	.676
Northwestern	12	–	8	.600	22	–	12	.647
Wisconsin	11	–	9	.550	22	–	14	.611
Indiana	10	–	10	.500	19	–	14	.576
Iowa	10	–	10	.500	19	–	15	.559
Michigan State	10	–	10	.500	20	–	15	.571
Minnesota	9	–	11	.450	19	–	15	.559
Ohio State	9	–	11	.450	22	–	14	.611
Penn State	9	–	11	.450	16	–	17	.485
Maryland	7	–	13	.350	16	–	17	.485
Rutgers	7	–	13	.350	15	–	17	.469
Michigan	3	–	17	.150	8	–	24	.250
† 2024 Big Ten tournament winner Rankings from AP poll

The 2023–24 Rutgers Scarlet Knights men's basketball team represented Rutgers University–New Brunswick during the 2023–24 NCAA Division I men's basketball season. The Scarlet Knights were led by eighth-year head coach Steve Pikiell and played their home games at Jersey Mike's Arena in Piscataway, New Jersey as members of the Big Ten Conference. They finished the season 15–17, 7–13 in Big Ten play to finish in a tie for 12th place. As the No. 13 seed in the Big Ten tournament, they lost Maryland in the first round.

== Previous season ==
The Scarlet Knights finished the 2022–23 season 18–13, 10–10 in Big Ten play to finish a tie for ninth place. As the No. 9 seed in the Big Ten tournament, they defeated Michigan in the quarterfinals before losing to Purdue in the quarterfinals. The Knights received an invitation to the National Invitation Tournament as a No. 1 seed. They were upset in the first round by Hofstra.

== Offseason ==
=== Departures ===
Name	Number	Pos.	Height	Weight	Year	Hometown	Reason for departure
Jalen Miller	2	G	6'2"	200	Sophomore	Frederick, MD	Transferred to Oral Roberts
Paul Mulcahy	4	G	6'6"	213	Senior	Bayonne, NJ	Graduate transferred to Washington
Cam Spencer	10	G	6'4"	207	Senior	Davidsonville, MD	Graduate transferred to UConn
Dean Reiber	21	F	6'10"	225	Junior	Greensboro, NC	Transferred to Charlotte
Caleb McConnell	22	G	6'7"	200	RS Senior	Jacksonville, FL	Graduated
Andrew Fulin	23	F	6'6"	195	Senior	Demarest, NJ	Walk-on; graduated
Logan Stephens	30	G	6'2"	197	Sophomore	Decatur, GA	Walk-on; transferred to Tulane

=== Incoming transfers ===
Name	Number	Pos.	Height	Weight	Year	Hometown	Previous college
Noah Fernandes	2	G	5'11"	180	GS Senior	Mattapoisett, MA	UMass
Jacob Morales	15	F	6'4"	190	Sophomore	Montvale, NJ	Walk-on; Springfield College
Emmanuel Ogbole	22	C	6'10"		Sophomore	Aune-Adoka, Nigeria	Monroe College
Austin Williams	24	G	6'4'	200	GS Senior	Roseland, NJ	FIU
Jeremiah Williams	25	G	6'4"	177	RS Junior	Chicago, IL	Iowa State
Zach Hayn	53	G	6'3"	190	Senior	Brooklyn, NY	Walk-on; Hartwick College

=== Recruiting classes ===
==== 2023 recruiting class ====
College recruiting information
Name	Hometown	School	Height	Weight	Commit date
Gavin Griffiths #12 PF	West Hartford, CT	Kingswood-Oxford Wyverns High School	6 ft 6 in (1.98 m)	175 lb (79 kg)	Jun 2, 2022
Gavin Griffiths #12 PF	Recruit ratings: Rivals: 247Sports: ESPN: (86)				
Jamichael Davis; PG	Powder Springs, GA	McEachern High School	6 ft 2 in (1.88 m)	155 lb (70 kg)	Jun 2, 2022
Jamichael Davis; PG	Recruit ratings: Rivals: 247Sports: ESPN: (NR)				
Overall recruit ranking:
Note: In many cases, Scout, Rivals, 247Sports, On3, and ESPN may conflict in their listings of height and weight.; In these cases, the average was taken. ESPN grades are on a 100-point scale.; Sources: "2023 Team Ranking". Rivals.

== Roster ==
2023–24 Rutgers Scarlet Knights men's basketball team
Players
Coaches

Pos.	#	Name	Height	Weight	Year	Previous school	Hometown
G	0	Derek Simpson	6 ft 3 in (1.91 m)	165 lb (75 kg)	So	Lenape	Mount Laurel, NJ
G	1	Jamichael Davis	6 ft 2 in (1.88 m)	175 lb (79 kg)	Fr	McEachern	Powder Springs, GA
G	2	Noah Fernandes	5 ft 11 in (1.8 m)	180 lb (82 kg)	GS	Woodstock Academy; UMass	Mattapoisett, MA
F	3	Mawot Mag	6 ft 7 in (2.01 m)	216 lb (98 kg)	Sr	Prolific Prep	Melbourne, Australia
F	5	Aundre Hyatt	6 ft 6 in (1.98 m)	235 lb (107 kg)	RS Sr	Miller School; LSU	The Bronx, NY
G	7	Aiden Terry	5 ft 10 in (1.78 m)	160 lb (73 kg)	Sr	Bullitt Central	Mount Washington, KY
F	9	Oskar Palmquist	6 ft 8 in (2.03 m)	220 lb (100 kg)	RS Sr	Marks Gymnasieskola	Kinna, Sweden
G	10	Gavin Griffiths	6 ft 8 in (2.03 m)	193 lb (88 kg)	Fr	Kingswood Oxford	Simsbury, CT
C	11	Clifford Omoruyi	6 ft 11 in (2.11 m)	240 lb (109 kg)	Sr	Roselle Catholic	Benin City, Nigeria
F	13	Antwone Woolfolk	6 ft 9 in (2.06 m)	225 lb (102 kg)	So	Brush	Cleveland, OH
G	15	Jacob Morales (W)	6 ft 4 in (1.93 m)	205 lb (93 kg)	So	Pascack Hills; Springfield College	Montvale, NJ
F	21	Antonio Chol	6 ft 9 in (2.06 m)	220 lb (100 kg)	So	Minnesota Preparatory Academy	Buffalo, NY
C	22	Emmanuel Ogbole	6 ft 10 in (2.08 m)	260 lb (118 kg)	So	Excel Model Secondary School; Monroe College	Aune-Adoka, Nigeria
G	23	Daniel Vessey (W)	6 ft 3 in (1.91 m)	190 lb (86 kg)	Fr	The Hun School	Princeton, NJ
G	24	Austin Williams	6 ft 4 in (1.93 m)	205 lb (93 kg)	GS	Seton Hall Prep; FIU	Roseland, NJ
G	25	Jeremiah Williams	6 ft 4 in (1.93 m)	177 lb (80 kg)	RS Jr	Simeon Career Academy; Iowa State	Chicago, IL
G	53	Zach Hayn (W)	6 ft 2 in (1.88 m)	195 lb (88 kg)	GS	Xaverian; Hartwick	Brooklyn, NY

Head coach

- Steve Pikiell (Connecticut)

Assistant coach(es)

- Brandin Knight (Pittsburgh)
- T. J. Thompson (George Washington)
- Marlon Williamson (Youngstown State)

Legend

- (C) Team captain
- (S) Suspended
- (I) Ineligible
- (W) Walk-on
- Injured
- Current redshirt

Roster

== Schedule and results ==
Date time, TV	Rank^{#}	Opponent^{#}	Result	Record	High points	High rebounds	High assists	Site (attendance) city, state
Exhibition
October 21, 2023*; 2:00 p.m., –		at St. John's; Dick Vitale Pediatric Cancer Research Game	L 78–89 ^{2OT}	–	16 – Davis	9 – Omoruyi	5 – Simpson	Carnesecca Arena (3,011); Queens, NY
Regular season
November 6, 2023*; 7:00 p.m., Peacock		vs. Princeton; Rivalry	L 61–68	0–1	12 – Omoruyi	7 – Tied	3 – Tied	CURE Insurance Arena (6,103); Trenton, NJ
November 10, 2023*; 7:00 p.m., B1G+		Boston University	W 69–45	1–1	25 – Griffiths	8 – Woolfolk	5 – Simpson	Jersey Mike's Arena (8,000); Piscataway, NJ
November 12, 2023*; 12:00 p.m., B1G+		Bryant	W 66–57	2–1	19 – Hyatt	15 – Omoruyi	4 – Simpson	Jersey Mike's Arena (8,000); Piscataway, NJ
November 15, 2023*; 8:30 p.m., FS1		Georgetown; Gavitt Tipoff Games	W 71–60	3–1	15 – Simpson	7 – Hyatt	4 – Simpson	Jersey Mike's Arena (8,000); Piscataway, NJ
November 18, 2023*; 6:00 p.m., B1G+		Howard	W 85–63	4–1	23 – Simpson	14 – Omoruyi	4 – Tied	Jersey Mike's Arena (8,000); Piscataway, NJ
November 27, 2023*; 7:00 p.m., B1G+		Saint Peter's	W 71–40	5–1	19 – Fernandes	8 – Omoruyi	4 – Davis	Jersey Mike's Arena (8,000); Piscataway, NJ
December 2, 2023; 4:00 p.m., BTN		No. 24 Illinois	L 58–76	5–2 (0–1)	9 – Tied	9 – Omoruyi	3 – A. Williams	Jersey Mike's Arena (8,000); Piscataway, NJ
December 6, 2023*; 6:00 p.m., ACCN		at Wake Forest	L 57–76	5–3	13 – Tied	5 – Tied	4 – Davis	LJVM Coliseum (7,692); Winston-Salem, NC
December 9, 2023*; 8:30 p.m., FS1		at Seton Hall; Garden State Hardwood Classic	W 70–63	6–3	19 – Fernandes	13 – Omoruyi	6 – Davis	Prudential Center (10,481); Newark, NJ
December 16, 2023*; 1:00 p.m., B1G+		LIU	W 83–61	7–3	25 – Omoruyi	12 – Hyatt	4 – Fernandes	Jersey Mike's Arena (8,000); Piscataway, NJ
December 23, 2023*; 12:00 p.m., BTN		vs. Mississippi State; Gotham Classic	L 60–70	7–4	18 – Hyatt	6 – Hyatt	6 – Simpson	Prudential Center (5,169); Newark, NJ
December 30, 2023*; 12:00 p.m., BTN		Stonehill	W 59–58	8–4	17 – Omoruyi	17 – Omoruyi	4 – Tied	Jersey Mike's Arena (8,000); Piscataway, NJ
January 3, 2024; 7:00 p.m., BTN		at Ohio State	L 72–76	8–5 (0–2)	23 – Simpson	10 – Hyatt	2 – Tied	Value City Arena (10,614); Columbus, OH
January 6, 2024; 12:00 p.m., BTN		at Iowa	L 77–86	8–6 (0–3)	24 – Mag	10 – Mag	3 – Davis	Carver–Hawkeye Arena (9,273); Iowa City, IA
January 9, 2024; 7:00 p.m., Peacock		Indiana	W 66–57	9–6 (1–3)	13 – Mag	11 – Omoruyi	4 – Mag	Jersey Mike's Arena (8,000); Piscataway, NJ
January 14, 2024; 12:00 p.m., BTN		at Michigan State	L 55–73	9–7 (1–4)	14 – Hyatt	8 – Omoruyi	3 – Tied	Breslin Center (14,797); East Lansing, MI
January 17, 2024; 7:00 p.m., BTN		Nebraska	W 87–82 ^{OT}	10–7 (2–4)	17 – Hyatt	15 – Omoruyi	8 – Simpson	Jersey Mike's Arena (8,000); Piscataway, NJ
January 21, 2024; 1:00 p.m., BTN		at No. 14 Illinois	L 63–86	10–8 (2–5)	22 – Omoruyi	9 – Omoruyi	2 – Tied	State Farm Center (15,544); Champaign, IL
January 28, 2024; 1:00 p.m., FOX		No. 2 Purdue	L 60–68	10–9 (2–6)	15 – Hyatt	6 – Tied	4 – Davis	Jersey Mike's Arena (8,000); Piscataway, NJ
January 31, 2024; 8:30 p.m., BTN		Penn State	L 46–61	10–10 (2–7)	11 – Griffiths	8 – Simpson	3 – Tied	Jersey Mike's Arena (8,000); Piscataway, NJ
February 3, 2024; 4:00 p.m., BTN		at Michigan	W 69–59	11–10 (3–7)	19 – Simpson	11 – Omoruyi	6 – Simpson	Crisler Center (11,863); Ann Arbor, MI
February 6, 2024; 6:30 p.m., BTN		at Maryland	W 56–53	12–10 (4–7)	15 – Mag	5 – Tied	3 – Simpson	Xfinity Center (12,866); College Park, MD
February 10, 2024; 12:00 p.m., BTN		No. 11 Wisconsin	W 78–56	13–10 (5–7)	18 – J. Williams	13 – Omoruyi	7 – J. Williams	Jersey Mike's Arena (8,000); Piscataway, NJ
February 15, 2024; 6:30 p.m., BTN		Northwestern	W 63–60	14–10 (6–7)	15 – J. Williams	9 – Omoruyi	5 – J. Williams	Jersey Mike's Arena (8,000); Piscataway, NJ
February 18, 2024; 6:30 p.m., BTN		at Minnesota	L 70–81	14–11 (6–8)	19 – Tied	8 – Omoruyi	4 – Tied	Williams Arena (9,680); Minneapolis, MN
February 22, 2024; 7:00 p.m., FS1		at No. 3 Purdue	L 68–96	14–12 (6–9)	12 – J. Williams	6 – Griffiths	3 – Griffiths	Mackey Arena (14,804); West Lafayette, IN
February 25, 2024; 12:00 p.m., BTN		Maryland	L 46–63	14–13 (6–10)	13 – Hyatt	5 – Griffiths	3 – J. Williams	Jersey Mike's Arena (8,000); Piscataway, NJ
February 29, 2024; 8:30 p.m., FS1		Michigan	W 82–52	15–13 (7–10)	19 – Tied	15 – Omoruyi	3 – Tied	Jersey Mike's Arena (8,000); Piscataway, NJ
March 3, 2024; 6:30 p.m., BTN		at Nebraska	L 56–67	15–14 (7–11)	14 – J. Williams	9 – Woolfolk	3 – Tied	Pinnacle Bank Arena (15,854); Lincoln, NE
March 7, 2024; 7:00 p.m., FS1		at Wisconsin	L 66–78	15–15 (7–12)	16 – Williams	6 – Davis	3 – Fernandes	Kohl Center (15,431); Madison, WI
March 10, 2024; 2:00 p.m., BTN		Ohio State	L 51–73	15–16 (7–13)	11 – Hyatt	7 – Omoruyi	2 – Tied	Jersey Mike's Arena (8,000); Piscataway, NJ
Big Ten tournament
March 13, 2024; 6:30 p.m., Peacock	(13)	vs. (12) Maryland; First round	L 51–65	15–17	16 – Griffiths	6 – Hyatt	4 – Simpson	Target Center (12,379); Minneapolis, MN
*Non-conference game. ^{#}Rankings from AP Poll. (#) Tournament seedings in parentheses. All times are in Eastern Time.

== Rankings ==
Ranking movements Legend: ██ Increase in ranking ██ Decrease in ranking — = Not ranked RV = Received votes
	Week																				
Poll	Pre	1	2	3	4	5	6	7	8	9	10	11	12	13	14	15	16	17	18	19	Final
AP	—	—	—	—	—	—	—	—	—	—	—	—	—	—	—	—	—	—	—	—	RV
Coaches	—	—	—	—	—	—	—	—	—	—	—	—	—	—	—	—	—	—	—	—	—
