= 2024 Big Ten men's basketball tournament =

American college basketball postseason tournament

- Classification: Division I
- Season: 2023–24
- Teams: 14
- Site: Target Center; Minneapolis, Minnesota
- Champions: Illinois (4th title)
- Winning coach: Brad Underwood (2nd title)
- MVP: Terrence Shannon Jr. (Illinois)
- Attendance: 90,418 (total); 13,991 (championship)
- Television: Peacock, BTN, CBS/Paramount+

2023–24 Big Ten Conference men's basketball standings
	Conf.				Overall
Team	W		L	PCT	W		L	PCT
No. 2 Purdue	17	–	3	.850	34	–	5	.872
No. 6 Illinois †	14	–	6	.700	29	–	9	.763
Nebraska	12	–	8	.600	23	–	11	.676
Northwestern	12	–	8	.600	22	–	12	.647
Wisconsin	11	–	9	.550	22	–	14	.611
Indiana	10	–	10	.500	19	–	14	.576
Iowa	10	–	10	.500	19	–	15	.559
Michigan State	10	–	10	.500	20	–	15	.571
Minnesota	9	–	11	.450	19	–	15	.559
Ohio State	9	–	11	.450	22	–	14	.611
Penn State	9	–	11	.450	16	–	17	.485
Maryland	7	–	13	.350	16	–	17	.485
Rutgers	7	–	13	.350	15	–	17	.469
Michigan	3	–	17	.150	8	–	24	.250
† 2024 Big Ten tournament winner Rankings from AP poll

The 2024 Big Ten men's basketball tournament (branded as the 2024 TIAA Big Ten Men's Basketball Tournament for sponsorship reasons) was a postseason men's basketball tournament for the Big Ten Conference of the 2023–24 NCAA Division I men's basketball season which took place from March 13–17, 2024. The tournament was held at the Target Center in Minneapolis, Minnesota. This was the first year in which the first round was broadcast by Peacock. As the tournament winner, Illinois received the conference's automatic bid to the 2024 NCAA Division I men's basketball tournament.

This was the last edition held in this tournament format, as the conference expanded to 18 teams the following year. The conference announced that 15 teams would participate in future tournaments, with the bottom three teams not qualifying.

== Seeds ==
All 14 Big Ten schools participated in the tournament. Teams were seeded by conference record, with a tiebreaker system used to seed teams with identical conference records. The top 10 teams received a first round bye and the top four teams received a double bye.

Seed	School	Conference	Tiebreak 1	Tiebreak 2	Tiebreak 3
1	Purdue	17–3			
2	Illinois	14–6			
3	Nebraska	12–8	1–1 vs. Northwestern	1–0 vs. Purdue	
4	Northwestern	12–8	1–1 vs. Nebraska	1–1 vs. Purdue	
5	Wisconsin	11–9			
6	Indiana	10–10	2–0 vs. Iowa/Michigan State		
7	Iowa	10–10	1–1 vs. Indiana/Michigan State		
8	Michigan State	10–10	0–2 vs. Indiana/Iowa		
9	Minnesota	9–11	3–1 vs. Ohio State/Penn State		
10	Ohio State	9–11	2–2 vs. Minnesota/Penn State		
11	Penn State	9–11	1–3 vs. Minnesota/Ohio State		
12	Maryland	7–13	1–1 vs. Rutgers	0–1 vs. Purdue	1–1 vs. Illinois
13	Rutgers	7–13	1–1 vs. Maryland	0–2 vs. Purdue	0–2 vs. Illinois
14	Michigan	3–17			

== Schedule ==
Session	Game	Time*	Matchup^{#}	Score	Television	Attendance
First round – Wednesday, March 13
1	1	5:30 pm	No. 12 Maryland vs. No. 13 Rutgers	65–51	Peacock	12,379
1	2	25 mins after Game 1	No. 11 Penn State vs. No. 14 Michigan	66–57	Peacock	12,379
Second round – Thursday, March 14
2	3	11:00 am	No. 8 Michigan State vs. No. 9 Minnesota	77–67	BTN	12,338
2	4	25 mins after Game 3	No. 5 Wisconsin vs. No. 12 Maryland	87−56	BTN	12,338
3	5	5:30 pm	No. 7 Iowa vs. No. 10 Ohio State	78–90	BTN	12,338
3	6	25 mins after Game 5	No. 6 Indiana vs. No. 11 Penn State	61–59	BTN	12,338
Quarterfinals – Friday, March 15
4	7	11:00 am	No. 1 Purdue vs. No. 8 Michigan State	67–62	BTN	12,609
4	8	25 mins after Game 7	No. 4 Northwestern vs. No. 5 Wisconsin	61–70	BTN	12,609
5	9	5:30 pm	No. 2 Illinois vs. No. 10 Ohio State	77–74	BTN	12,625
5	10	25 mins after Game 9	No. 3 Nebraska vs. No. 6 Indiana	93–66	BTN	12,625
Semifinals – Saturday, March 16
6	11	12:00 pm	No. 1 Purdue vs. No. 5 Wisconsin	75–76^{OT}	CBS	14,138
6	12	25 mins after Game 11	No. 2 Illinois vs. No. 3 Nebraska	98–87	CBS	14,138
Championship – Sunday, March 17
7	13	2:30 pm	No. 5 Wisconsin vs. No. 2 Illinois	87–93	CBS	13,991

*Game times in Central Time. #Rankings denote tournament seeding.

== Bracket ==
First round Wednesday, March 13; Peacock
12	Maryland	65
13	Rutgers	51
11	Penn State	66
14	Michigan	57

Second round Thursday, March 14; BTN
8	Michigan State	77
9	Minnesota	67
5	Wisconsin	87
12	Maryland	56
7	Iowa	78
10	Ohio State	90
6	Indiana	61
11	Penn State	59

Quarterfinals; Friday, March 15; BTN
1	Purdue	67
8	Michigan State	62
4	Northwestern	61
5	Wisconsin	70
2	Illinois	77
10	Ohio State	74
3	Nebraska	93
6	Indiana	66

Semifinals; Saturday, March 16; CBS
1	Purdue	75
5	Wisconsin	76*
2	Illinois	98
3	Nebraska	87

Championship; Sunday, March 17; CBS
5	Wisconsin	87
2	Illinois	93

* denotes overtime period

== Game summaries ==
=== First round ===
Peacock

March 13
5:30 pm

No. 13 Rutgers 51, No. 12 Maryland 65
Scoring by half: 22–36, 29–29
Pts: Gavin Griffiths, 16; Rebs: Aundre Hyatt, 6 Asts: Derek Simpson, 4	Pts: Donta Scott, 16; Rebs: Jahmir Young, 8 Asts: Jahmir Young, 7

Target Center
Minneapolis, MN
Attendance: 12,379

Peacock

March 13
8:00 pm

No. 14 Michigan 57, No. 11 Penn State 66
Scoring by half: 22–33, 35–33
Pts: Terrance Williams II, 15; Rebs: Tarris Reed Jr., 8 Asts: Dug McDaniel, 6	Pts: Zach Hicks, 20; Rebs: Qudus Wahab, 8 Asts: Ace Baldwin Jr., 6

Target Center
Minneapolis, MN
Attendance: 12,379

=== Second round ===
BTN

March 14
11:00 am

No. 9 Minnesota 67, No. 8 Michigan State 77
Scoring by half: 34−32, 33−43
Pts: Dawson Garcia, 19; Rebs: tied, 4 Asts: Elijah Hawkins, 7	Pts: A.J. Hoggard, 17; Rebs: Jaden Akins, 7 Asts: A.J. Hoggard, 6

Target Center
Minneapolis, MN
Referees: Brian Dorsey, DJ Carstensen, John Lloyd

BTN

March 14
1:30 pm

No. 12 Maryland 56, No. 5 Wisconsin 87
Scoring by half: 26−47, 30−40
Pts: Jahmir Young, 18; Rebs: Julian Reese, 5 Asts: DeShawn Harris-Smith, 3	Pts: John Blackwell, 18; Rebs: Tied, 5 Asts: Chucky Hepburn, 8

Target Center
Minneapolis, MN
Attendance: 12,338
Referees: Rob Riley, Kelly Pfeifer, Earl Walton

BTN

March 14
5:30 pm

No. 10 Ohio State 90, No. 7 Iowa 78
Scoring by half: 43−38, 47−40
Pts: Jamison Battle, 23; Rebs: Jamison Battle, 9 Asts: Bruce Thorton, 9	Pts: Payton Sandford, 19; Rebs: Owen Freeman, 9 Asts: Tony Perkins, 7

Target Center
Minneapolis, MN
Referees: Bill Ek, Tim Comer, Paul Szelic

BTN

March 14
8:00 pm

No. 11 Penn State 59, No. 6 Indiana 61
Scoring by half: 27−32, 32−29
Pts: Puff Johnson, 16; Rebs: Qudus Wahab, 9 Asts: Ace Baldwin Jr., 6	Pts: Kel'el Ware, 18; Rebs: Kel'el Ware, 14; Asts: Xavier Johnson, 5

Target Center
Minneapolis, MN
Attendance: 12,338
Referees: Andy O'Brien, Courtney Green, Jeff Anderson

=== Quarterfinals ===
BTN

March 15
11:00 am

No. 8 Michigan State 62, No. 1 Purdue 67
Scoring by half: 27−34, 35−33
Pts: Tyson Walker, 15; Rebs: Tied, 7 Asts: A.J. Hoggard, 10	Pts: Zach Edey, 29; Rebs: Zach Edey, 12; Asts: Braden Smith, 8

Target Center
Minneapolis, MN
Attendance: 12,498
Referees: Paul Szelc, Earl Walton, Courtney Green

BTN

March 15
1:30 pm

No. 5 Wisconsin 70, No. 4 Northwestern 61
Scoring by half: 33−29, 37−32
Pts: AJ Storr, 30; Rebs: Steven Crowl, 7 Asts: Max Klesmit, 7	Pts: Boo Buie, 29; Rebs: Brooks Barnhizer, 14; Asts: Tied, 3

Target Center
Minneapolis, MN
Attendance: 12,609
Referees: Bill Ek, Kelly Pfeifer, Jeff Anderson

BTN

March 15
5:30 pm

No. 10 Ohio State 74, No. 2 Illinois 77
Scoring by half: 29−31, 45−46
Pts: Jamison Battle, 21; Rebs: Felix Okpara, 10; Asts: Bruce Thornton, 10	Pts: Terrence Shannon, 28; Rebs: Ty Rodgers, 10; Asts: Marcus Domask, 4

Target Center
Minneapolis, MN
Attendance: 12,625
Referees: Brian Dorsey, Rob Riley, Rob Kueneman

BTN

March 15
8:00 pm

No. 6 Indiana 66, No. 3 Nebraska 93
Scoring by half: 27−50, 39−43
Pts: CJ Gunn, 17; Rebs: Tied, 7 Asts: Xavier Johnson, 5	Pts: Tied, 23; Rebs: Josiah Allick, 9 Asts: Rienk Mast, 7

Target Center
Minneapolis, MN
Attendance: 12,625
Referees: DJ Cartensen, Tim Comer, Edwin Young

=== Semifinals ===
CBS

March 16
12:00 pm

No. 1 Purdue 75, No. 5 Wisconsin 76 (OT)
Scoring by half: 36−36, 30−30 Overtime: 9−10
Pts: Chucky Hepburn, 22; Rebs: AJ Storr, 6 Asts: Max Klesmit, 5	Pts: Zach Edey, 28; Rebs: Zach Edey, 11; Asts: Braden Smith, 10

Target Center
Minneapolis, MN
Attendance: 14,138
Referees: Jeff Anderson, Brian Dorsey, Rob Riley

CBS

March 16
2:30 pm

No. 2 Illinois 98, No. 3 Nebraska 87
Scoring by half: 40−51, 58−36
Pts: Brice Williams, 23; Rebs: Josiah Allick, 7 Asts: Tied, 3	Pts: Terrence Shannon, 40; Rebs: Ty Rodgers, 13; Asts: Marcus Domask, 8

Target Center
Minneapolis, MN
Attendance: 14,138
Referees: Paul Szelc, Earl Watson, DJ Carstensen

=== Championship ===
CBS

March 17
2:30 pm

No. 5 Wisconsin 87, No. 2 Illinois 93
Scoring by half: 40−41, 47−52

Target Center
Minneapolis, MN
Attendance: 13,991
