= 2023–24 Maryland Terrapins men's basketball team =

American college basketball season

2023–24 Maryland Terrapins men's basketball
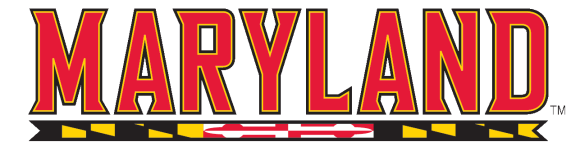
- Conference: Big Ten Conference
- Record: 16–17 (7–13 Big Ten)
- Head coach: Kevin Willard (2nd season)
- Associate head coach: David Cox
- Assistant coaches: Mike Jones; Greg Manning Jr.
- Home arena: Xfinity Center

2023–24 Big Ten Conference men's basketball standings
	Conf.				Overall
Team	W		L	PCT	W		L	PCT
No. 2 Purdue	17	–	3	.850	34	–	5	.872
No. 6 Illinois †	14	–	6	.700	29	–	9	.763
Nebraska	12	–	8	.600	23	–	11	.676
Northwestern	12	–	8	.600	22	–	12	.647
Wisconsin	11	–	9	.550	22	–	14	.611
Indiana	10	–	10	.500	19	–	14	.576
Iowa	10	–	10	.500	19	–	15	.559
Michigan State	10	–	10	.500	20	–	15	.571
Minnesota	9	–	11	.450	19	–	15	.559
Ohio State	9	–	11	.450	22	–	14	.611
Penn State	9	–	11	.450	16	–	17	.485
Maryland	7	–	13	.350	16	–	17	.485
Rutgers	7	–	13	.350	15	–	17	.469
Michigan	3	–	17	.150	8	–	24	.250
† 2024 Big Ten tournament winner Rankings from AP poll

The 2023–24 Maryland Terrapins men's basketball team represented the University of Maryland, College Park in the 2023–24 NCAA Division I men's basketball season. They were led by second-year head coach Kevin Willard and played their home games at Xfinity Center in College Park, Maryland, as members of the Big Ten Conference. They finished the season 16–17, 7–13 in Big Ten play to finish in a tie for 12th place. As the No. 12 seed in the Big Ten tournament, they defeated Rutgers in the first round before losing to Wisconsin 87-56. The team declined an offer to play in the postseason NIT. The Maryland Terrapins men's basketball team drew an average home attendance of 13,283 in 17 games in 2023-24.

== Previous season ==
The Terrapins finished the 2022–23 season 22–13, 11–9 in Big Ten play to finish in a three-way tie for fifth place. As the No. 6 seed in the Big Ten tournament, they defeated Minnesota in the second round before losing to Indiana in the quarterfinals. They received an at-large bid to the NCAA Tournament as the No. 8 seed in the South region. There they defeated West Virginia in the first round before losing to overall No. 1 seed Alabama in the second round.

== Offseason ==
=== Player departures ===
Name	Num	Pos.	Height	Weight	Year	Hometown	Reason for departure
Hakim Hart	13	G	6'8"	205	Senior	Philadelphia, PA	Graduate transferred to Villanova
Don Carey	0	G	6'5"	187	GS Senior	Upper Marlboro, MD	Graduated
Ian Martinez	23	G	6'3"	185	Junior	Heredia, Costa Rica	Transferred to Utah State
Patrick Emilien	15	F	6'7"	210	GS Senior	Toronto, ON	Graduated
Ike Cornish	20	G/F	6'6"	190	Sophomore	Baltimore, MD	Transferred to Ohio
Arnaud Revaz	31	F	6'10"	230	Junior	Sion, Switzerland	Transferred to Weber State
Pavlo Dziuba	12	F	6'8"	235	Junior	Kyiv, Ukraine	Transferred to High Point
Brett Karkus	32	G	6'4"	185	Sophomore	Hewlett, NY	Walk-on; transferred
Carson Dick	30	G	6'2"	175	Junior	Glenelg, MD	Walk-on; left the team for personal reasons
RJ Floyd	40	G	6'3"	165	Sophomore	Upper Marlboro	Walk-on; left the team for personal reasons

=== Incoming transfers ===
Name	Num	Pos.	Height	Weight	Year	Hometown	Transfer From
Chance Stephens	13	G	6'3"	170	Sophomore	Riverside, CA	Loyola Marymount
Mady Traoré	14	F/C	6'11"	195	Sophomore	Fresnes, France	New Mexico State
Jordan Geronimo	22	F	6'6"	225	Junior	Newark, NJ	Indiana

=== Recruiting class ===
College recruiting
Name	Hometown	School	Height	Weight	Commit date
DeShawn Harris-Smith #5 SF	Fairfax, VA	Paul VI High School	6 ft 4 in (1.93 m)	180 lb (82 kg)	Aug 27, 2022
DeShawn Harris-Smith #5 SF	Recruit ratings: Scout: Rivals: 247Sports: ESPN: (87)				
Jamie Kaiser #17 SF	Alexandria, VA	IMG Academy	6 ft 6 in (1.98 m)	200 lb (91 kg)	Aug 7, 2022
Jamie Kaiser #17 SF	Recruit ratings: Scout: Rivals: 247Sports: ESPN: (84)				
Jahnathan Lamothe #26 SG	Baltimore, MD	St. Frances Academy	6 ft 2 in (1.88 m)	185 lb (84 kg)	Jun 5, 2022
Jahnathan Lamothe #26 SG	Recruit ratings: Scout: Rivals: 247Sports: ESPN: (81)				
Braden Pierce #47 C	Woodstock, GA	IMG Academy	7 ft 0 in (2.13 m)	230 lb (100 kg)	Jan 28, 2023
Braden Pierce #47 C	Recruit ratings: Scout: Rivals: 247Sports: ESPN: (76)				
Overall recruit ranking:
Note: In many cases, Scout, Rivals, 247Sports, On3, and ESPN may conflict in their listings of height and weight.; In these cases, the average was taken. ESPN grades are on a 100-point scale.; Sources: "2023 Team Ranking". Rivals.; "Maryland 2023 Basketball Commits". 247Sports.

== Roster ==
2023–24 Maryland Terrapins men's basketball team
Players
Coaches

Pos.	#	Name	Height	Weight	Year	Previous school	Hometown
G	0	Jahnathan Lamothe	6 ft 4 in (1.93 m)	192 lb (87 kg)	Fr	St. Frances Academy	Baltimore, Maryland
G	1	Jahmir Young	6 ft 1 in (1.85 m)	185 lb (84 kg)	GS	DeMatha Catholic HS; Charlotte	Upper Marlboro, Maryland
G	2	Jahari Long	6 ft 5 in (1.96 m)	200 lb (91 kg)	Sr	Episcopal HS; Seton Hall	Houston, Texas
C	4	Braden Pierce	7 ft 0 in (2.13 m)	230 lb (104 kg)	Fr	IMG Academy (FL)	Woodstock, Georgia
G	5	DeShawn Harris-Smith	6 ft 5 in (1.96 m)	215 lb (98 kg)	Fr	Paul VI Catholic	Woodbridge, Virginia
F	10	Julian Reese	6 ft 9 in (2.06 m)	230 lb (104 kg)	Jr	St. Frances Academy	Baltimore, Maryland
G/F	11	Noah Batchelor	6 ft 6 in (1.98 m)	185 lb (84 kg)	So	Glenelg Country School	Frederick, Maryland
F	12	Jamie Kaiser	6 ft 6 in (1.98 m)	205 lb (93 kg)	Fr	IMG Academy (FL)	Burke, Virginia
G	13	Chance Stephens	6 ft 3 in (1.91 m)	185 lb (84 kg)	So	Polytechnic HS; Loyola Marymount	Riverside, California
F	14	Mady Traoré	6 ft 11 in (2.11 m)	195 lb (88 kg)	So	Believe Prep; New Mexico State	Paris, France
F	22	Jordan Geronimo	6 ft 6 in (1.98 m)	225 lb (102 kg)	Jr	St. Paul's School; Indiana	Newark, New Jersey
F	24	Donta Scott	6 ft 8 in (2.03 m)	230 lb (104 kg)	GS	Imhotep Charter HS	Philadelphia, Pennsylvania
G	30	Lukas Sotell (W)	6 ft 3 in (1.91 m)	170 lb (77 kg)	Fr	Stamford HS	Stamford, Connecticut
C	35	Caelum Swanton-Rodger	6 ft 11 in (2.11 m)	220 lb (100 kg)	So	Edge School	Calgary, Alberta
G	40	Ben Murphy (W)	6 ft 1 in (1.85 m)	193 lb (88 kg)	Jr	Franklin HS	Reisterstown, Maryland

Head coach

- Kevin Willard (Pittsburgh)

Assistant coach(es)

- David Cox (William & Mary)
- Mike Jones (Old Dominion)
- Greg Manning Jr. (Loyola (MD))

Legend

- (C) Team captain
- (S) Suspended
- (I) Ineligible
- (W) Walk-on
- Injured
- Current redshirt

Roster

=== Depth chart ===
Pos.	Starting 5	Bench 1	Bench 2
C	Julian Reese	Caelum Swanton-Rodger	Braden Pierce
PF	Jordan Geronimo	Mady Traore
SF	Donta Scott	Jamie Kaiser	Chance Stephens
SG	Deshawn Harris-Smith	Noah Batchelor
PG	Jahmir Young	Jahari Long	Jahnathan Lamothe

== Schedule and results ==
Date time, TV	Rank^{#}	Opponent^{#}	Result	Record	High points	High rebounds	High assists	Site (attendance) city, state
Regular season
November 7, 2023*; 7:00 p.m., BTN Plus		Mount St. Mary's	W 68–53	1–0	18 – Reese	8 – Reese	4 – Young	Xfinity Center (14,044); College Park, MD
November 10, 2023*; 7:00 p.m., ESPNU		vs. Davidson; Asheville Championship semifinals	L 61–64	1–1	18 – Young	11 – Reese	7 – Young	Harrah's Cherokee Center (N/A); Asheville, NC
November 12, 2023*; 12:30 p.m., ESPN2		vs. UAB; Asheville Championship third place game	L 63–66	1–2	14 – Young	7 – Scott	6 – Young	Harrah's Cherokee Center (1,507); Asheville, NC
November 17, 2023*; 8:30 p.m., FS1		at No. 21 Villanova; Gavitt Tipoff Games	L 40–57	1–3	10 – Reese	6 – Reese	3 – Long	Finneran Pavilion (6,501); Villanova, PA
November 21, 2023*; 7:00 p.m., BTN		UMBC	W 92–68	2–3	20 – Young	13 – Reese	2 – Tied	Xfinity Center (13,146); College Park, MD
November 25, 2023*; 7:00 p.m., BTN		South Alabama	W 68–55	3–3	19 – Tied	15 – Reese	5 – Harris-Smith	Xfinity Center (12,358); College Park, MD
November 28, 2023*; 7:00 p.m., BTN Plus		Rider	W 103–76	4–3	22 – Tied	12 – Reese	5 – Young	Xfinity Center (10,432); College Park, MD
December 1, 2023; 7:00 p.m., BTN		at Indiana	L 53–65	4–4 (0–1)	20 – Young	8 – Reese	2 – Tied	Simon Skjodt Assembly Hall (17,222); Bloomington, IN
December 6, 2023; 7:00 p.m., BTN		Penn State	W 81–75 ^{OT}	5–4 (1–1)	28 – Young	15 – Reese	4 – Harris-Smith	Xfinity Center (15,290); College Park, MD
December 12, 2023*; 7:00 p.m., BTN		Alcorn State	W 105–65	6–4	15 – Reese	7 – Reese	7 – Young	Xfinity Center (10,008); College Park, MD
December 19, 2023*; 8:30 p.m., BTN		Nicholls	W 73–67	7–4	23 – Young	13 – Reese	4 – Young	Xfinity Center (11,004); College Park, MD
December 22, 2023*; 9:00 p.m., ESPN2		at UCLA	W 69–60	8–4	37 – Young	7 – Young	3 – Young	Pauley Pavilion (7,056); Los Angeles, CA
December 28, 2023*; 7:00 p.m., BTN		Coppin State	W 75–53	9–4	18 – Reese	10 – Reese	5 – Harris-Smith	Xfinity Center (10,891); College Park, MD
January 2, 2024; 7:00 p.m., Peacock		No. 1 Purdue	L 53–67	9–5 (1–2)	26 – Young	7 – Tied	2 – Tied	Xfinity Center (14,314); College Park, MD
January 7, 2024; 5:30 p.m., BTN		at Minnesota	L 62–65	9–6 (1–3)	20 – Young	9 – Reese	4 – Harris-Smith	Williams Arena (8,583); Minneapolis, MN
January 11, 2024; 7:00 p.m., FS1		Michigan	W 64–57	10–6 (2–3)	22 – Scott	13 – Reese	5 – Young	Xfinity Center (12,007); College Park, MD
January 14, 2024; 2:00 p.m., BTN		at No. 10 Illinois	W 76–67	11–6 (3–3)	28 – Young	11 – Reese	8 – Young	State Farm Center (15,544); Champaign, IL
January 17, 2024; 9:00 p.m., BTN		at Northwestern	L 69–72	11–7 (3–4)	36 – Young	9 – Reese	5 – Young	Welsh–Ryan Arena (5,642); Evanston, IL
January 21, 2024; 12:00 p.m., CBS		Michigan State	L 59–61	11–8 (3–5)	19 – Young	12 – Reese	4 – Young	Xfinity Center (15,103); College Park, MD
January 24, 2024; 7:00 p.m., BTN		at Iowa	W 69–67	12–8 (4–5)	22 – Young	9 – Reese	4 – Young	Carver–Hawkeye Arena (8,532); Iowa City, IA
January 27, 2024; 12:00 p.m., BTN		Nebraska	W 73–51	13–8 (5–5)	15 – Reese	16 – Reese	6 – Young	Xfinity Center (15,481); College Park, MD
February 3, 2024; 5:30 p.m., FOX		at Michigan State	L 54–63	13–9 (5–6)	31 – Young	10 – Scott	3 – Reese	Breslin Center (14,797); East Lansing, MI
February 6, 2024; 6:30 p.m., BTN		Rutgers	L 53–56	13–10 (5–7)	19 – Reese	12 – Tied	3 – Young	Xfinity Center (12,866); College Park, MD
February 10, 2024; 4:00 p.m., FS1		at Ohio State	L 75–79 ^{2OT}	13–11 (5–8)	26 – Young	13 – Reese	4 – Young	Value City Arena (13,471); Columbus, OH
February 14, 2024; 8:30 p.m., BTN		Iowa	W 78–66	14–11 (6–8)	21 – Young	13 – Reese	6 – Harris-Smith	Xfinity Center (12,031); College Park, MD
February 17, 2024; 5:30 p.m., FOX		No. 14 Illinois	L 80–85	14–12 (6–9)	28 – Young	11 – Reese	6 – Young	Xfinity Center (17,950); College Park, MD
February 20, 2024; 9:00 p.m., Peacock		at Wisconsin	L 70–74	14–13 (6–10)	20 – Young	7 – Reese	3 – Tied	Kohl Center (15,147); Madison, WI
February 25, 2024; 12:00 p.m., BTN		at Rutgers	W 63–46	15–13 (7–10)	20 – Reese	11 – Geronimo	9 – Young	Jersey Mike's Arena; Piscataway, NJ
February 28, 2024; 7:00 p.m., BTN		Northwestern	L 61–68	15–14 (7–11)	24 – Young	6 – Swanton-Rodger	6 – Young	Xfinity Center (12,340); College Park, MD
March 3, 2024; 2:00 p.m., CBS		Indiana	L 78–83	15–15 (7–12)	22 – Young	11 – Reese	4 – Young	Xfinity Center (16,540); College Park, MD
March 10, 2024; 7:30 p.m., BTN		at Penn State	L 69–85	15–16 (7–13)	16 – Young	7 – Young	4 – Young	Bryce Jordan Center (8,796); University Park, PA
Big Ten tournament
March 13, 2024; 6:30 p.m., Peacock	(12)	vs. (13) Rutgers; First round	W 65–51	16–16	16 – Scott	8 – Young	7 – Young	Target Center; Minneapolis, MN
March 14, 2024; 2:30 p.m., BTN	(12)	vs. (5) Wisconsin; Second round	L 56–87	16–17	18 – Young	5 – Reese	3 – Harris-Smith	Target Center; Minneapolis, MN
*Non-conference game. ^{#}Rankings from AP Poll. (#) Tournament seedings in parentheses. All times are in Eastern Time.

== Rankings ==
Ranking movements Legend: ██ Increase in ranking ██ Decrease in ranking — = Not ranked RV = Received votes
	Week																				
Poll	Pre	1	2	3	4	5	6	7	8	9	10	11	12	13	14	15	16	17	18	19	Final
AP	RV	—	—	—	—	—	—	—	—	—	—	—	—	—	—	—	—	—	—	—	RV
Coaches	RV	—	—	—	—	—	—	—	—	—	—	—	—	—	—	—	—	—	—	—	—
