= 2023–24 Iowa Hawkeyes men's basketball team =

2023–24 Iowa Hawkeyes men's basketball

NIT, Second Round
- Conference: Big Ten Conference
- Record: 19–15 (10–10 Big Ten)
- Head coach: Fran McCaffery (14th season)
- Assistant coaches: Sherman Dillard; Matt Gatens; Courtney Eldridge
- Home arena: Carver–Hawkeye Arena

2023–24 Big Ten Conference men's basketball standings
	Conf.				Overall
Team	W		L	PCT	W		L	PCT
No. 2 Purdue	17	–	3	.850	34	–	5	.872
No. 6 Illinois †	14	–	6	.700	29	–	9	.763
Nebraska	12	–	8	.600	23	–	11	.676
Northwestern	12	–	8	.600	22	–	12	.647
Wisconsin	11	–	9	.550	22	–	14	.611
Indiana	10	–	10	.500	19	–	14	.576
Iowa	10	–	10	.500	19	–	15	.559
Michigan State	10	–	10	.500	20	–	15	.571
Minnesota	9	–	11	.450	19	–	15	.559
Ohio State	9	–	11	.450	22	–	14	.611
Penn State	9	–	11	.450	16	–	17	.485
Maryland	7	–	13	.350	16	–	17	.485
Rutgers	7	–	13	.350	15	–	17	.469
Michigan	3	–	17	.150	8	–	24	.250
† 2024 Big Ten tournament winner Rankings from AP poll

The 2023–24 Iowa Hawkeyes men's basketball team represented the University of Iowa during the 2023–24 NCAA Division I men's basketball season. The team was led by 14th-year head coach Fran McCaffery and played its home games at Carver–Hawkeye Arena as members of the Big Ten Conference. They finished the season 19–15, 10–10 in Big Ten play, resulting in a three-way tie for sixth place. As the No. 7 seed in the Big Ten tournament, they lost to No. 10-seeded Ohio State in the second round. The Hawkeyes accepted a bid to the NIT as the No. 3 seed in the Villanova bracket. Following a win against Kansas State, the Hawkeyes lost in the second round to Utah.

== Previous season ==
The Hawkeyes finished the 2022–23 season 19–14, 11–9 in Big Ten play to finish in a four-way tie for fifth place. As the No. 5 seed in the Big Ten tournament, it lost to No. 13-seeded Ohio State in the second round. The Hawkeyes received an at-large bid to the NCAA tournament as the No. 8 seed in the Midwest region where it lost to Auburn in the First Round.

== Offseason ==
=== Recruiting class ===
College recruiting
Name	Hometown	School	Height	Weight	Commit date
Pryce Sandfort #15 PG	Waukee, IA	Northwest High School	6 ft 6 in (1.98 m)	160 lb (73 kg)	Aug 6, 2022
Pryce Sandfort #15 PG	Recruit ratings: Rivals: 247Sports: ESPN: (82)				
Owen Freeman #29 C	Moline, IL	Moline Senior High School	6 ft 9 in (2.06 m)	225 lb (102 kg)	Oct 11, 2021
Owen Freeman #29 C	Recruit ratings: Rivals: 247Sports: ESPN: (80)				
Brock Harding; PG	Moline, IL	Moline Senior High School	6 ft 0 in (1.83 m)	155 lb (70 kg)	Jun 23, 2022
Brock Harding; PG	Recruit ratings: Rivals: 247Sports: ESPN: (NR)				
Overall recruit ranking: 247Sports: 68
Note: In many cases, Scout, Rivals, 247Sports, On3, and ESPN may conflict in their listings of height and weight.; In these cases, the average was taken. ESPN grades are on a 100-point scale.; Sources: "2023 Iowa Basketball Commitment List". Rivals.; "ESPN – Iowa Hawkeyes Men's Basketball Recruiting". ESPN.; "2023 Team Ranking". Rivals.; "Iowa 2023 Basketball Commits". 247Sports.

== Roster ==
2023–24 Iowa Hawkeyes men's basketball team
Players
Coaches

Pos.	#	Name	Height	Weight	Year	Previous school	Hometown
C	0	Even Brauns	6 ft 9 in (2.06 m)	240 lb (109 kg)	Sr	Iowa City West HS; Belmont	Iowa City, IA
G	1	Spencer Hutchison (W)	6 ft 4 in (1.93 m)	202 lb (92 kg)	RS Fr	The Episcopal School of Dallas	Dallas, TX
G	2	Brock Harding	6 ft 1 in (1.85 m)	160 lb (73 kg)	Fr	Moline HS	Moline, IL
G	4	Josh Dix	6 ft 5 in (1.96 m)	192 lb (87 kg)	So	Lincoln HS	Council Bluffs, IA
G	5	Dasonte Bowen	6 ft 2 in (1.88 m)	174 lb (79 kg)	So	Brewster Academy	Boston, MA
G	11	Tony Perkins	6 ft 4 in (1.93 m)	205 lb (93 kg)	Sr	Lawrence North HS	Indianapolis, IN
F	13	Ladji Dembele	6 ft 9 in (2.06 m)	250 lb (113 kg)	Fr	St. Benedict's Prep	Newark, NJ
G	14	Carter Kingsbury (W)	6 ft 4 in (1.93 m)	225 lb (102 kg)	RS So	Brewster Academy	Ponca, NE
G	20	Payton Sandfort	6 ft 7 in (2.01 m)	215 lb (98 kg)	Jr	Waukee HS	Waukee, IA
F	22	Patrick McCaffery	6 ft 9 in (2.06 m)	210 lb (95 kg)	RS Sr	Iowa City West HS	Iowa City, IA
F	23	Ben Krikke	6 ft 9 in (2.06 m)	245 lb (111 kg)	GS	Edmonton, Alberta, Canada
F	24	Pryce Sandfort	6 ft 7 in (2.01 m)	190 lb (86 kg)	Fr	Waukee Northwest HS	Waukee, IA
G	25	Luc Laketa (W)	6 ft 5 in (1.96 m)	180 lb (82 kg)	Jr	The Winchendon School	Concord, MI
F	32	Owen Freeman	6 ft 11 in (2.11 m)	225 lb (102 kg)	Fr	Moline HS	Moline, IL
C	44	Riley Mulvey (redshirt)	6 ft 11 in (2.11 m)	245 lb (111 kg)	Jr	St. Thomas More School	Rotterdam, NY

Head coach

- Fran McCaffery (Penn)

Assistant coach(es)

- Sherman Dillard (James Madison)
- Matt Gatens (Iowa)
- Courtney Eldridge (UNC Greensboro)

Legend

- (C) Team captain
- (S) Suspended
- (I) Ineligible
- (W) Walk-on
- Injured
- Current redshirt

Roster

== Schedule and results ==
Date time, TV	Rank^{#}	Opponent^{#}	Result	Record	High points	High rebounds	High assists	Site (attendance) city, state
Exhibition
October 30, 2023*; 7:00 p.m., BTN Plus		Quincy	W 103–76	–	16 – McCaffery	7 – Tied	4 – Harding	Carver–Hawkeye Arena (–); Iowa City, IA
Regular season
November 7, 2023*; 7:00 p.m., BTN Plus		North Dakota	W 110–68	1–0	21 – Pa. Sandfort	9 – Pa. Sandfort	7 – Harding	Carver–Hawkeye Arena (7,653); Iowa City, IA
November 10, 2023*; 7:00 p.m., Peacock		Alabama State	W 98–67	2–0	22 – McCaffery	12 – Pa. Sandfort	7 – Harding	Carver–Hawkeye Arena (8,814); Iowa City, IA
November 14, 2023*; 9:00 p.m., FS1		at No. 8 Creighton; Gavitt Tipoff Games	L 84–92	2–1	24 – Krikke	6 – Tied	4 – Bowen	CHI Health Center Omaha (17,352); Omaha, NE
November 17, 2023*; 7:00 p.m., BTN Plus		Arkansas State	W 88–74	3–1	25 – Krikke	9 – Krikke	4 – Pa. Sandfort	Carver–Hawkeye Arena (9,536); Iowa City, IA
November 23, 2023*; 2:00 p.m., FS1		vs. Oklahoma; Rady Children's Invitational semifinal	L 67–79	3–2	13 – Freeman	7 – Tied	2 – Tied	LionTree Arena (3,500); San Diego, CA
November 24, 2023*; 5:00 p.m., FOX		vs. Seton Hall; Rady Children's Invitational 3rd place game	W 85–72	4–2	22 – Pa. Sandfort	9 – Pa. Sandfort	5 – Tied	LionTree Arena (3,912); San Diego, CA
November 29, 2023*; 8:00 p.m., BTN		North Florida	W 103–78	5–2	21 – Tied	8 – Pa. Sandfort	4 – Dix	Carver–Hawkeye Arena (8,641); Iowa City, IA
December 4, 2023; 6:00 p.m., BTN		at No. 4 Purdue	L 68–87	5–3 (0–1)	16 – Krikke	6 – Tied	4 – Tied	Mackey Arena (14,876); West Lafayette, IN
December 7, 2023*; 6:30 p.m., ESPNU		at Iowa State; Iowa Corn Cy-Hawk Series	L 65–90	5–4	14 – Pa. Sandfort	8 – Freeman	4 – Bowen	Hilton Coliseum (14,267); Ames, IA
December 10, 2023; 3:30 p.m., BTN		Michigan	L 80–90	5–5 (0–2)	24 – Krikke	8 – Krikke	5 – Bowen	Carver–Hawkeye Arena (10,000); Iowa City, IA
December 16, 2023*; 3:30 p.m., BTN		vs. Florida A&M	W 88–52	6–5	14 – Freeman	11 – Freeman	7 – Perkins	Wells Fargo Arena (14,786); Des Moines, IA
December 20, 2023*; 7:00 p.m., BTN		UMBC	W 103–81	7–5	23 – Perkins	12 – Krikke	12 – Harding	Carver–Hawkeye Arena (8,357); Iowa City, IA
December 29, 2023*; 6:00 p.m., BTN Plus		Northern Illinois	W 103–74	8–5	20 – Krikke	9 – Freeman	8 – Perkins	Carver–Hawkeye Arena (11,846); Iowa City, IA
January 2, 2024; 6:00 p.m., BTN		at No. 21 Wisconsin	L 72–83	8–6 (0–3)	25 – Perkins	13 – Freeman	4 – McCaffery	Kohl Center (15,725); Madison, WI
January 6, 2024; 11:00 a.m., BTN		Rutgers	W 86–77	9–6 (1–3)	24 – Pa. Sandfort	10 – Krikke	4 – Dix	Carver–Hawkeye Arena (9,273); Iowa City, IA
January 12, 2024; 8:30 p.m., BTN		Nebraska	W 94–76	10–6 (2–3)	22 – Freeman	10 – Tied	15 – Perkins	Carver–Hawkeye Arena (9,670); Iowa City, IA
January 15, 2024; 5:00 p.m., BTN		at Minnesota	W 86–77	11–6 (3–3)	25 – Krikke	8 – Freeman	5 – Tied	Williams Arena (8,379); Minneapolis, MN
January 20, 2024; 1:00 p.m., FS1		No. 2 Purdue	L 70–84	11–7 (3–4)	24 – Perkins	7 – Pa. Sandfort	7 – Dix	Carver–Hawkeye Arena (14,232); Iowa City, IA
January 24, 2024; 6:00 p.m., BTN		Maryland	L 67–69	11–8 (3–5)	20 – Perkins	9 – Freeman	2 – Tied	Carver–Hawkeye Arena (8,532); Iowa City, IA
January 27, 2024; 4:00 p.m., FS1		at Michigan	W 88–78	12–8 (4–5)	26 – Pa. Sandfort	9 – Freeman	5 – Perkins	Crisler Center (11,752); Ann Arbor, MI
January 30, 2024; 6:00 p.m., BTN		at Indiana	L 68–74	12–9 (4–6)	26 – Pa. Sandfort	8 – Pa. Sandfort	3 – Perkins	Simon Skjodt Assembly Hall (17,222); Bloomington, IN
February 2, 2024; 6:00 p.m., FS1		Ohio State	W 79–77	13–9 (5–6)	20 – Perkins	7 – Perkins	4 – Perkins	Carver–Hawkeye Arena (9,986); Iowa City, IA
February 8, 2024; 6:00 p.m., BTN		at Penn State	L 79–89	13–10 (5–7)	22 – Krikke	5 – Tied	8 – Perkins	Bryce Jordan Center (8,140); University Park, PA
February 11, 2024; 2:00 p.m., BTN		Minnesota	W 90–85	14–10 (6–7)	21 – Pa. Sandfort	14 – Freeman	4 – Tied	Carver–Hawkeye Arena (9,768); Iowa City, IA
February 14, 2024; 7:30 p.m., BTN		at Maryland	L 66–78	14–11 (6–8)	19 – Pa. Sandfort	8 – Tied	3 – Tied	Xfinity Center (12,031); College Park, MD
February 17, 2024; 1:15 p.m., BTN		No. 20 Wisconsin	W 88–86 ^{OT}	15–11 (7–8)	20 – Freeman	12 – Freeman	6 – Freeman	Carver–Hawkeye Arena (14,998); Iowa City, IA
February 20, 2024; 6:00 p.m., Peacock		at Michigan State	W 78–71	16–11 (8–8)	22 – Pa. Sandfort	14 – Krikke	5 – Perkins	Breslin Center (14,797); East Lansing, MI
February 24, 2024; 1:15 p.m., BTN		at No. 12 Illinois; Rivalry	L 85–95	16–12 (8–9)	20 – Dix	8 – Tied	4 – Perkins	State Farm Center (15,544); Champaign, IL
February 27, 2024; 8:00 p.m., BTN		Penn State	W 90–81	17–12 (9–9)	26 – Pa. Sandfort	10 – Pa. Sandfort	10 – Pa. Sandfort	Carver–Hawkeye Arena (8,502); Iowa City, IA
March 2, 2024; 4:30 p.m., BTN		at Northwestern	W 87–80	18–12 (10–9)	24 – Dix	6 – Freeman	14 – Perkins	Welsh–Ryan Arena (7,039); Evanston, IL
March 10, 2024; 6:00 p.m., FS1		No. 12 Illinois; Rivalry	L 61–73	18–13 (10–10)	23 – Pa. Sandfort	8 – Freeman	6 – Harding	Carver–Hawkeye Arena (14,998); Iowa City, IA
Big Ten tournament
March 14, 2024; 5:30 p.m., BTN	(7)	vs. (10) Ohio State; Second Round	L 78–90	18–14	19 – Pa. Sandfort	9 – Freeman	7 – Perkins	Target Center; Minneapolis, MN
NIT
March 19, 2024; 8:00 p.m., ESPN	(3)	Kansas State; First Round - Villanova Bracket	W 91–82	19–14	30 – Pa. Sandfort	12 – Pa. Sandfort	8 – Perkins	Carver–Hawkeye Arena (4,532); Iowa City, IA
March 24, 2024; 8:00 p.m., ESPN2	(3)	at (2) Utah; Second Round - Villanova Bracket	L 82–91	19–15	19 – McCaffery	7 – Freeman	4 – Tied	Jon M. Huntsman Center (3,804); Salt Lake City, UT
*Non-conference game. ^{#}Rankings from AP Poll. (#) Tournament seedings in parentheses. All times are in Central Time.

== Rankings ==
Ranking movements Legend: RV = Received votes
	Week																				
Poll	Pre	1	2	3	4	5	6	7	8	9	10	11	12	13	14	15	16	17	18	19	Final
AP																					
Coaches		RV	RV																		
