= 2023–24 Penn State Nittany Lions basketball team =

American college basketball season

2023–24 Penn State Nittany Lions basketball
- Conference: Big Ten Conference
- Record: 16–17 (9–11 Big Ten)
- Head coach: Mike Rhoades (1st season)
- Associate head coach: Jamal Brunt (1st season)
- Assistant coaches: Brent Scott (1st season); Jimmy Martelli (1st season)
- Home arena: Bryce Jordan Center

2023–24 Big Ten Conference men's basketball standings
	Conf.				Overall
Team	W		L	PCT	W		L	PCT
No. 2 Purdue	17	–	3	.850	34	–	5	.872
No. 6 Illinois †	14	–	6	.700	29	–	9	.763
Nebraska	12	–	8	.600	23	–	11	.676
Northwestern	12	–	8	.600	22	–	12	.647
Wisconsin	11	–	9	.550	22	–	14	.611
Indiana	10	–	10	.500	19	–	14	.576
Iowa	10	–	10	.500	19	–	15	.559
Michigan State	10	–	10	.500	20	–	15	.571
Minnesota	9	–	11	.450	19	–	15	.559
Ohio State	9	–	11	.450	22	–	14	.611
Penn State	9	–	11	.450	16	–	17	.485
Maryland	7	–	13	.350	16	–	17	.485
Rutgers	7	–	13	.350	15	–	17	.469
Michigan	3	–	17	.150	8	–	24	.250
† 2024 Big Ten tournament winner Rankings from AP poll

The 2023–24 Penn State Nittany Lions basketball team represented Penn State University during the 2023–24 NCAA Division I men's basketball season. They were led by first-year head coach Mike Rhoades, and played their home games at Bryce Jordan Center located in University Park, Pennsylvania as members of the Big Ten Conference. They finished the season 16–17, 9–11 in Big Ten play to finish in a three-way tie for 10th place. As the No. 11 seed in the Big Ten tournament, they defeated Michigan in the first round before losing to Indiana in the second round.

== Previous season ==
The Nittany Lions finished the season 23–14, 10–10 in Big Ten play to finish in a tie for ninth place. They defeated Illinois, Northwestern, and Indiana in the Big Ten tournament to advance to the semifinals before losing to Purdue. They received an at-large bid to the NCAA tournament for the first time since 2011 as the No. 10 seed in the Midwest region. They defeated Texas A&M in the first round of the tournament, marking their first tournament win since 2001, before losing to Texas in the second round.

On March 22, 2023, head coach Micah Shrewsberry left the school to take the head coaching job at Notre Dame. On March 29, the school named VCU head coach Mike Rhoades the team's new head coach.

== Offseason ==
=== Departures ===
Penn State departures
Name	Number	Pos.	Height	Weight	Year	Hometown	Reason for departure
Seth Lundy	1	G/F	6'6"	220	Senior	Paulsboro, NJ	Declared for 2023 NBA draft; selected 46th overall by Atlanta Hawks
Myles Dread	2	G/F	6'4"	235	GS Senior	Detroit, MI	Graduated
Kebba Njie	3	F	6'10"	237	Freshman	Centerville, OH	Transferred to Notre Dame
Caleb Dorsey	4	F	6'7"	235	Junior	Westminster, MD	Transferred to William & Mary
Andrew Funk	10	G	6'5"	200	GS Senior	Warrington Township, PA	Graduated; went undrafted in 2023 NBA draft
Camren Wynter	11	G	6'2"	200	GS Senior	Hempstead, NY	Graduated
Evan Mahaffey	12	G/F	6'6"	200	Freshman	Cincinnati, OH	Transferred to Ohio State
Jalen Pickett	22	G	6'4"	209	GS Senior	Rochester, NY	Graduated; selected 32nd overall by Indiana Pacers in 2023 NBA draft
Dallion Johnson	23	G	6'3"	180	Junior	Haverhill, MA	Transferred to Florida Gulf Coast
Michael Henn	24	F	6'8"	244	GS Senior	Bellevue, WA	Graduated
Ishaan Jagiasi	35	G	6'1"	197	Senior	Wilmington, DE	Graduated

=== Incoming transfers ===
Penn State incoming transfers
Name	Number	Pos.	Height	Weight	Year	Hometown	Previous school
Ace Baldwin Jr.	1	G	6'1"	190	Senior	Baltimore, MD	VCU
D'Marco Dunn	2	G	6'5"	195	Junior	Tucson, AZ	North Carolina
Nick Kern Jr.	3	G	6'6"	200	Junior	St. Louis, MO	VCU
Puff Johnson	4	G/F	6'8"	205	Senior	Moon Township, PA	North Carolina
Leo O'Boyle	11	F	6'7"	225	GS Senior	Scranton, PA	Lafayette
Favour Aire	12	F	6'11"	220	Sophomore	Ekpoma, Nigeria	Miami (FL)
RayQuawndis Mitchell	21	G	6'5"	195	GS Senior	Blaine, MN	Kansas City
Qudus Wahab	22	F/C	6'11"	245	GS Senior	Lagos, Nigeria	Georgetown
Zach Hicks	24	F	6'8"	200	Junior	Camden, NJ	Temple

=== Recruiting classes ===
==== 2023 recruiting class ====
College recruiting information
Name	Hometown	School	Height	Weight	Commit date
Bragi Guðmundsson; PG	Grindavík, Iceland	Fjölbrautaskóli Suðurnesja	6 ft 5 in (1.96 m)	185 lb (84 kg)	May 17, 2023
Bragi Guðmundsson; PG	Recruit ratings: No ratings found				
Overall recruit ranking: Rivals: 73 247Sports: 129 ESPN: —
Note: In many cases, Scout, Rivals, 247Sports, On3, and ESPN may conflict in their listings of height and weight.; In these cases, the average was taken. ESPN grades are on a 100-point scale.; Sources: "Penn State 2023 Basketball Commitments". Rivals.; "2023 Penn State Nittany Lions Recruiting Class". ESPN.; "2023 Team Ranking". Rivals.; "Penn State 2023 Basketball Commits". 247Sports.

==== 2024 recruiting class ====
College recruiting information (2024)
Name	Hometown	School	Height	Weight	Commit date
Miles Goodman #17 C	Seattle, Washington	Southern California Academy	6 ft 10 in (2.08 m)	225 lb (102 kg)	Nov 6, 2023
Miles Goodman #17 C	Recruit ratings: Rivals: 247Sports: ESPN:				
Jahvin Carter #39 SG	Alcoa, Tennessee	Alcoa High School	6 ft 2 in (1.88 m)	175 lb (79 kg)	Jun 26, 2023
Jahvin Carter #39 SG	Recruit ratings: Rivals: 247Sports:				
Dominick Stewart #33 PG	Lanham, Maryland	Southern California Academy	6 ft 5 in (1.96 m)	180 lb (82 kg)	Sep 22, 2023
Dominick Stewart #33 PG	Recruit ratings: Rivals: 247Sports:				
Hudson Ward #40 SF	Edmonton, Alberta	Western Canada Prep Academy	6 ft 7 in (2.01 m)	210 lb (95 kg)	Jan 31, 2023
Hudson Ward #40 SF	Recruit ratings: 247Sports:				
Overall recruit ranking: Rivals: 39 247Sports: 25 ESPN: —
Note: In many cases, Scout, Rivals, 247Sports, On3, and ESPN may conflict in their listings of height and weight.; In these cases, the average was taken. ESPN grades are on a 100-point scale.; Sources: "Penn State 2024 Basketball Commitments". Rivals.; "2024 Penn State Nittany Lions Recruiting Class". ESPN.; "2024 Team Ranking". Rivals.; "Penn State 2024 Basketball Commits". 247Sports.

== Roster ==
2023–24 Penn State Nittany Lions men's basketball team
Players
Coaches

Pos.	#	Name	Height	Weight	Year	Previous school	Hometown
G	0	Kanye Clary (Note: Clary was dismissed from the program on February 19.)	5 ft 11 in (1.8 m)	192 lb (87 kg)	So	Massanutten Military Academy	Virginia Beach, VA
G	1	Ace Baldwin Jr.	6 ft 1 in (1.85 m)	190 lb (86 kg)	Sr	VCU	Baltimore, MD
G	2	D'Marco Dunn	6 ft 5 in (1.96 m)	195 lb (88 kg)	Jr	North Carolina	Tucson, AZ
G	3	Nick Kern Jr.	6 ft 6 in (1.98 m)	200 lb (91 kg)	Jr	VCU	St. Louis, MO
G/F	4	Puff Johnson	6 ft 8 in (2.03 m)	205 lb (93 kg)	Sr	North Carolina	Moon Township, PA
G	5	Jameel Brown	6 ft 4 in (1.93 m)	188 lb (85 kg)	So	Westtown School	Philadelphia, PA
G	6	Bragi Guðmundsson	6 ft 5 in (1.96 m)	175 lb (79 kg)	Fr	Fjölbrautaskóli Suðurnesja	Grindavík, Iceland
F	11	Leo O'Boyle	6 ft 7 in (2.01 m)	225 lb (102 kg)	GS	Lafayette	Scranton, PA
F	12	Favour Aire	6 ft 11 in (2.11 m)	220 lb (100 kg)	So	Miami (FL)	Ekpoma, Nigeria
F	14	Demetrius Lilley	6 ft 10 in (2.08 m)	245 lb (111 kg)	So	Lower Merion HS	Philadelphia, PA
G	15	Dan Conlan (W)	6 ft 4 in (1.93 m)	186 lb (84 kg)	Sr	Dickinson	Sewickley, PA
G	21	RayQuawndis Mitchell	6 ft 5 in (1.96 m)	195 lb (88 kg)	GS	Kansas City	Blaine, MN
F	22	Qudus Wahab	6 ft 11 in (2.11 m)	245 lb (111 kg)	GS	Georgetown	Lagos, Nigeria
F	24	Zach Hicks	6 ft 8 in (2.03 m)	200 lb (91 kg)	Jr	Temple	Camden, NJ
G	33	Andy Christos (W)	6 ft 5 in (1.96 m)	186 lb (84 kg)	Sr	Vermont Academy	Madison, NJ

Head coach

- Mike Rhoades (Lebanon Valley)

Assistant coach(es)

- Jamal Brunt (Randolph–Macon)
- Brent Scott (Rice)
- Jimmy Martelli (Dickinson)

Legend

- (C) Team captain
- (S) Suspended
- (I) Ineligible
- (W) Walk-on
- Injured
- Current redshirt

Roster
Last update: March 10, 2024

== Schedule and results ==
Date time, TV	Rank^{#}	Opponent^{#}	Result	Record	High points	High rebounds	High assists	Site (attendance) city, state
Exhibition
October 27, 2023; 7:00 p.m.		at Robert Morris; Coaches vs. Cancer and American Cancer Society	W 68–58		15 – Wahab	10 – Wahab	6 – Baldwin Jr.	UPMC Events Center (2,417); Moon Township, PA
Regular season
November 6, 2023*; 7:00 p.m., BTN Plus		Delaware State	W 79–45	1–0	22 – Clary	13 – Wahab	5 – Baldwin Jr.	Bryce Jordan Center (7,345); University Park, PA
November 10, 2023*; 7:30 p.m., BTN Plus		Lehigh	W 74–65	2–0	20 – Clary	18 – Wahab	2 – Clary	Bryce Jordan Center (10,272); University Park, PA
November 14, 2023*; 7:00 p.m., BTN		Saint Francis (PA)	W 83–53	3–0	14 – Clary	6 – Wahab	4 – Baldwin Jr.	Bryce Jordan Center (7,546); University Park, PA
November 17, 2023*; 7:00 p.m., Peacock		Morehead State	W 74–51	4–0	14 – Tied	12 – Wahab	4 – Baldwin Jr.	Bryce Jordan Center (7,558); University Park, PA
November 23, 2023*; 12:00 p.m., ESPN		vs. No. 12 Texas A&M; ESPN Events Invitational quarterfinal	L 77–89	4–1	19 – Clary	5 – Wahab	4 – Clary	State Farm Field House; Bay Lake, FL
November 24, 2023*; 1:30 p.m., ESPN+		vs. Butler; ESPN Events Invitational consolation 2nd round	L 78–88	4–2	28 – Clary	8 – Hicks	3 – Tied	State Farm Field House (2,194); Bay Lake, FL
November 26, 2023*; 10:30 a.m., ESPNU		vs. VCU; ESPN Events Invitational 7th place game	L 74–86	4–3	27 – Baldwin, Jr.	6 – Wahab	5 – Baldwin, Jr.	State Farm Field House; Bay Lake, FL
December 2, 2023*; 12:00 p.m., BTN		Bucknell	L 67–76	4–4	18 – Wahab	8 – Wahab	6 – Clary	Bryce Jordan Center (8,590); University Park, PA
December 6, 2023; 7:00 p.m., BTN		at Maryland	L 75–81 ^{OT}	4–5 (0–1)	25 – Clary	9 – Wahab	5 – Baldwin Jr.	Xfinity Center (15,290); College Park, MD
December 9, 2023; 6:00 p.m., BTN		Ohio State	W 83–80	5–5 (1–1)	19 – Clary	6 – Hicks	5 – Baldwin Jr.	Bryce Jordan Center (9,732); University Park, PA
December 16, 2023*; 12:00 p.m., BTN		vs. Georgia Tech	L 81–82 ^{OT}	5–6	23 – Clary	10 – Wahab	7 – Baldwin Jr.	Madison Square Garden; New York, NY
December 21, 2023*; 7:00 p.m., Peacock		Le Moyne	W 72–55	6–6	20 – Clary	9 – Wahab	6 – Clary	Bryce Jordan Center (5,023); University Park, PA
December 29, 2023*; 2:00 p.m., BTN Plus		Rider	W 90–63	7–6	29 – Clary	7 – Wahab	9 – Baldwin Jr.	Bryce Jordan Center (6,807); University Park, PA
January 4, 2024; 7:00 p.m., Peacock		at Michigan State	L 61–92	7–7 (1–2)	21 – Clary	8 – Wahab	5 – Clary	Breslin Center (14,797); East Lansing, MI
January 7, 2024; 12:00 p.m., BTN		vs. Michigan; The Palestra Game	W 79–73	8–7 (2–2)	25 – Baldwin Jr.	8 – Kern Jr.	4 – Baldwin Jr.	The Palestra (6,200); Philadelphia, PA
January 10, 2024; 6:30 p.m., BTN		Northwestern	L 72–76	8–8 (2–3)	25 – Clary	10 – Wahab	5 – Baldwin, Jr.	Bryce Jordan Center (7,822); University Park, PA
January 13, 2024; 2:15 p.m., BTN		at No. 1 Purdue	L 78–95	8–9 (2–4)	18 – Kern Jr.	4 – Tied	13 – Baldwin Jr.	Mackey Arena (14,876); West Lafayette, IN
January 16, 2024; 9:00 p.m., BTN		No. 11 Wisconsin	W 87–83	9–9 (3–4)	27 – Clary	6 – Lilley	5 – Baldwin Jr.	Bryce Jordan Center (8,462); University Park, PA
January 20, 2024; 12:00 p.m., BTN		at Ohio State	L 67–79	9–10 (3–5)	16 – Tied	10 – Wahab	3 – Baldwin Jr.	Value City Arena (15,267); Columbus, OH
January 27, 2024; 6:30 p.m., BTN		Minnesota	L 74–83	9–11 (3–6)	16 – Baldwin Jr.	5 – Wahab	6 – Baldwin Jr.	Bryce Jordan Center (12,336); University Park, PA
January 31, 2024; 8:30 p.m., BTN		at Rutgers	W 61–46	10–11 (4–6)	15 – Baldwin Jr.	11 – Wahab	10 – Baldwin Jr.	Jersey Mike's Arena (8,000); Piscataway, NJ
February 3, 2024; 12:00 p.m., FS1		at Indiana	W 85–71	11–11 (5–6)	22 – Baldwin Jr.	7 – Wahab	8 – Baldwin Jr.	Simon Skjodt Assembly Hall (17,222); Bloomington, IN
February 8, 2024; 7:00 p.m., BTN		Iowa	W 89–79	12–11 (6–6)	22 – Baldwin Jr.	7 – Wahab	6 – Baldwin Jr.	Bryce Jordan Center (8,140); University Park, PA
February 11, 2024; 1:00 p.m., BTN		at Northwestern	L 63–68	12–12 (6–7)	18 – Kern Jr.	7 – Kern Jr.	8 – Baldwin Jr.	Welsh–Ryan Arena (5,541); Evanston, IL
February 14, 2024; 6:30 p.m., BTN		Michigan State	L 72–80	12–13 (6–8)	15 – Tied	4 – Tied	7 – Baldwin Jr.	Bryce Jordan Center (8,813); University Park, PA
February 17, 2024; 12:00 p.m., BTN		at Nebraska	L 49–68	12–14 (6–9)	13 – Hicks	6 – Hicks	2 – Baldwin Jr.	Pinnacle Bank Arena (15,751); Lincoln, NE
February 21, 2024; 6:30 p.m., BTN		No. 12 Illinois; Return to Rec	W 90–89	13–14 (7–9)	22 – Kern Jr.	8 – Hicks	12 – Baldwin Jr.	Rec Hall (6,150); University Park, PA
February 24, 2024; 12:00 p.m., BTN		Indiana	W 83–74	14–14 (8–9)	23 – Baldwin Jr.	11 – Wahab	9 – Baldwin Jr.	Bryce Jordan Center (11,578); University Park, PA
February 27, 2024; 9:00 p.m., BTN		at Iowa	L 81–90	14–15 (8–10)	18 – Wahab	7 – Tied	9 – Baldwin Jr.	Carver–Hawkeye Arena (8,502); Iowa City, IA
March 2, 2024; 3:15 p.m., BTN		at Minnesota	L 70–75	14–16 (8–11)	19 – Johnson	6 – Tied	8 – Baldwin Jr.	Williams Arena (11,318); Minneapolis, MN
March 10, 2024; 7:30 p.m., BTN		Maryland	W 85–69	15–16 (9–11)	19 – Wahab	15 – Wahab	11 – Baldwin Jr.	Bryce Jordan Center (8,796); University Park, PA
Big Ten Tournament
March 13, 2024; 9:00 p.m., Peacock	(11)	vs. (14) Michigan; First round	W 66–57	16–16	20 – Hicks	8 – Wahab	6 – Baldwin Jr.	Target Center (12,379); Minneapolis, MN
March 14, 2024; 9:00 p.m., BTN	(11)	vs. (6) Indiana; Second round	L 59–61	16–17	16 – Johnson	9 – Wahab	6 – Baldwin Jr.	Target Center (12,338); Minneapolis, MN
*Non-conference game. ^{#}Rankings from AP Poll. (#) Tournament seedings in parentheses. All times are in Eastern Time.

== Rankings ==
Ranking movements Legend: ██ Increase in ranking ██ Decrease in ranking — = Not ranked RV = Received votes
	Week																				
Poll	Pre	1	2	3	4	5	6	7	8	9	10	11	12	13	14	15	16	17	18	19	Final
AP	—	RV	RV	—	—	—	—	—	—	—	—	—	—	—	—	—	—	—	RV		
Coaches	—	—	—	—	—	—	—	—	—	—	—	—	—	—	—	—	—	—	—	—	
