= 2023–24 Illinois Fighting Illini men's basketball team =

American college basketball season

2023–24 Illinois Fighting Illini men's basketball

Big Ten tournament champions

NCAA tournament, Elite Eight
- Conference: Big Ten Conference

Ranking
- Coaches: No. 7
- AP: No. 6
- Record: 29–9 (14–6 Big Ten)
- Head coach: Brad Underwood (7th season)
- Assistant coaches: Chester Frazier (3rd season); Tim Anderson (3rd season); Geoff Alexander (3rd season); Zach Hamer (1st season); Tyler Underwood (1st season)
- Captains: Coleman Hawkins; Terrence Shannon Jr.
- Home arena: State Farm Center

2023–24 Big Ten Conference men's basketball standings
	Conf.				Overall
Team	W		L	PCT	W		L	PCT
No. 2 Purdue	17	–	3	.850	34	–	5	.872
No. 6 Illinois †	14	–	6	.700	29	–	9	.763
Nebraska	12	–	8	.600	23	–	11	.676
Northwestern	12	–	8	.600	22	–	12	.647
Wisconsin	11	–	9	.550	22	–	14	.611
Indiana	10	–	10	.500	19	–	14	.576
Iowa	10	–	10	.500	19	–	15	.559
Michigan State	10	–	10	.500	20	–	15	.571
Minnesota	9	–	11	.450	19	–	15	.559
Ohio State	9	–	11	.450	22	–	14	.611
Penn State	9	–	11	.450	16	–	17	.485
Maryland	7	–	13	.350	16	–	17	.485
Rutgers	7	–	13	.350	15	–	17	.469
Michigan	3	–	17	.150	8	–	24	.250
† 2024 Big Ten tournament winner Rankings from AP poll

The 2023–24 Illinois Fighting Illini men's basketball team represented the University of Illinois during the 2023–24 NCAA Division I men's basketball season. The Illini were led by seventh-year head coach Brad Underwood. The Illini played their home games at the State Farm Center in Champaign, Illinois as members of the Big Ten Conference. They defeated Wisconsin to win the Big Ten Tournament. The team was then awarded the #3 seed in the East region of the NCAA Tournament, in which they advanced their first Elite Eight since 2005. There they lost to the eventual champion, UConn 77–52.

The Illinois Fighting Illini men's basketball team drew an average home attendance of 14,990 in 18 games in 2023–24.

== Previous season ==
The Illini finished the 2022–23 season 20–13, 11–9 in Big Ten play to finish in a four-way tie for fifth place. As the No. 7 seed in the Big Ten tournament, they lost to Penn State in the second round. They received an at-large bid to the NCAA tournament as the No. 9 seed in the West Region where they lost to Arkansas in the First Round.

== Offseason ==
Niccolo Moretti joined the Illini for the second semester of the 2022-2023 academic year and took part in practice and officially joined the team this season.

After declaring for the 2023 NBA draft, both Terrence Shannon Jr. and Coleman Hawkins withdrew and returned to the Illini. Jeremiah Williams committed to transfer to Illinois on June 1, 2023, but later withdrew that commitment and rejoined the transfer portal later that month on June 23.

In August, the Illini took a ten-day trip to Spain where they played and won three games against Spanish teams. None of the games were televised but the Illini provided a link to stream the second game for free on Vimeo.

=== Departures ===
Name	Pos.	Height	Weight	Year	Hometown	Reason for departure
Jayden Epps	G	6'2"	190	Freshman	Suffolk, Virginia	Transferred to Georgetown
Brandon Lieb	C	7'0"	210	Junior	Deerfield, Illinois	Transferred to Illinois State
RJ Melendez	G/F	6'7"	205	Sophomore	Arecibo, Puerto Rico	Transferred to Georgia
Matthew Mayer	F	6'9"	225	Graduate Student	Austin, Texas	Graduated; Undrafted in 2023 NBA draft, signed with Houston Rockets
Skyy Clark	G	6'3"	200	Freshman	Los Angeles, California	Left team after 13 games. Transferred to Louisville
Zacharie Perrin	F	6'10"	220	Redshirt Freshman	Grandfontaine, France	Left team after one game. Returned to France
Connor Serven	F	6'9"	235	Junior	Prairie City, Illinois	Transferred to Eastern Michigan
Paxton Warden	G	6'4"	180	Freshman	Glen Ellyn, Illinois	Transferred to Lewis University

=== Incoming transfers ===
Name	Number	Pos.	Height	Weight	Year	Hometown	Previous School
Marcus Domask	3	G/F	6'6"	215	Graduate Student	Waupun, Wisconsin	Southern Illinois
Quincy Guerrier	13	G/F	6'8"	230	Graduate Student	Quebec City	Oregon
Justin Harmon	4	CG	6'4"	200	Graduate Student	Chicago, Illinois	Utah Valley
Keaton Kutcher	22	G	6'2"	200	Junior	Mount Vernon, Iowa	South Dakota
Max Williams	25	G	6'2"	200	Senior	Chicago, Illinois	DePaul

=== 2023 recruiting class ===
College recruiting information
Name	Hometown	School	Height	Weight	Commit date
Amani Hansberry; PF	Silver Spring, Maryland	Mount Saint Joseph	6 ft 8 in (2.03 m)	225 lb (102 kg)	Nov 9, 2022
Amani Hansberry; PF	Recruit ratings: Rivals: 247Sports: On3: ESPN: (84)				
Dra Gibbs-Lawhorn; CG	Lafayette, Indiana	Word of God	6 ft 1 in (1.85 m)	165 lb (75 kg)	Nov 9, 2022
Dra Gibbs-Lawhorn; CG	Recruit ratings: Rivals: 247Sports: On3: ESPN: (82)				
Overall recruit ranking: Rivals: 25 247Sports: 37 On3: 35
Note: In many cases, Scout, Rivals, 247Sports, On3, and ESPN may conflict in their listings of height and weight.; In these cases, the average was taken. ESPN grades are on a 100-point scale.; Sources: "2023 Illinois Commits". Rivals.; "ESPN- Illinois Fighting Illini Men's Basketball Recruiting". ESPN.; "2023 Team Ranking". Rivals.; "2023–24 Illinois Fighting Illini men's basketball team". 247Sports.; "2023–24 Illinois Fighting Illini men's basketball team". On3.

== Roster ==
2023–24 Illinois Fighting Illini men's basketball team
Players
Coaches

Pos.	#	Name	Height	Weight	Year	Previous school	Hometown
G	0	Terrence Shannon Jr. (C)	6 ft 6 in (1.98 m)	225 lb (102 kg)	GS	Texas Tech	Chicago, Illinois
G	1	Sencire Harris (redshirt)	6 ft 4 in (1.93 m)	160 lb (73 kg)	So	St. Vincent–St. Mary	North Canton, Ohio
G	2	Dra Gibbs-Lawhorn	6 ft 1 in (1.85 m)	185 lb (84 kg)	Fr	Word of God	Lafayette, Indiana
G/F	3	Marcus Domask	6 ft 6 in (1.98 m)	215 lb (98 kg)	GS	Southern Illinois	Waupun, Wisconsin
G	4	Justin Harmon	6 ft 4 in (1.93 m)	200 lb (91 kg)	GS	Utah Valley	Chicago, Illinois
G	5	AJ Redd (W)	6 ft 3 in (1.91 m)	170 lb (77 kg)	So	St. Ignatius	Chicago, Illinois
G/F	10	Luke Goode	6 ft 7 in (2.01 m)	205 lb (93 kg)	Jr	Homestead	Fort Wayne, Indiana
G	11	Niccolo Moretti	6 ft 1 in (1.85 m)	170 lb (77 kg)	RS Fr	NBA Global Academy (Australia)	Bologna, Italy
G/F	13	Quincy Guerrier	6 ft 8 in (2.03 m)	230 lb (104 kg)	GS	Oregon	Montreal, Quebec
G/F	20	Ty Rodgers	6 ft 6 in (1.98 m)	210 lb (95 kg)	So	Thornton Township	Saginaw, Michigan
G	22	Keaton Kutcher (W) (redshirt)	6 ft 2 in (1.88 m)	200 lb (91 kg)	Jr	South Dakota	Mount Vernon, Iowa
G	25	Max Williams (W)	6 ft 2 in (1.88 m)	200 lb (91 kg)	Sr	DePaul	Chicago, Illinois
F	33	Coleman Hawkins (C)	6 ft 10 in (2.08 m)	230 lb (104 kg)	Sr	Prolific Prep	Sacramento, California
F	35	Amani Hansberry	6 ft 8 in (2.03 m)	240 lb (109 kg)	Fr	Mount Saint Joseph	Silver Spring, Maryland
F/C	42	Dain Dainja	6 ft 9 in (2.06 m)	255 lb (116 kg)	RS Jr	Baylor	Brooklyn Park, Minnesota

Head coach

- Brad Underwood (Kansas State)

Assistant coach(es)

- Chester Frazier (Illinois)
- Tim Anderson (Oklahoma Panhandle State)
- Geoff Alexander (Western Illinois)
- Zach Hamer (Vanderbilt)
- Tyler Underwood (Illinois)

Legend

- (C) Team captain
- (S) Suspended
- (I) Ineligible
- (W) Walk-on
- Injured
- Current redshirt

Roster
Last update: 4/3/24

Note: While listed above as a graduate student for NCAA eligibility purposes, Shannon is a fifth-year senior working towards his bachelor's degree.

=== Roster movement ===
- Shannon was suspended prior to the December 29 game against FDU and became eligible to play again January 19.
- Moretti suffered a foot injury during the November 19 game against Southern and suited up for the January 14 game against Maryland, but did not play until the following game against Michigan.
- Hansberry began sitting out games with back spasms starting with the game against Purdue on January 5 and returned to action against Ohio State on January 30.

== Schedule and results ==
Date time, TV	Rank^{#}	Opponent^{#}	Result	Record	High points	High rebounds	High assists	Site (attendance) city, state
Spain trip
August 6, 2023*; 12:00 p.m., –		at Madrid All-Stars	W 84–73		16 – Dainja	15 – Dainja	4 – Shannon Jr.	WiZink Center (122); Madrid, Spain
August 9, 2023*; 12:00 p.m., Vimeo		at Valencia International Basketball Academy	W 105–60		25 – Shannon Jr.	9 – Tied	5 – Hawkins	L’Alqueria Del Basket (242); Valencia, Spain
August 13, 2023*; 5:00 a.m., –		at Catalonia All-Stars	W 103–69		19 – Hansberry	11 – Tied	4 – Moretti	Palau d'Esports Josep Mora (152); Barcelona, Spain
Exhibition
October 20, 2023*; 8:00 p.m., B1G+	No. 25	Ottawa (KS)	W 116–65		18 – Shannon Jr.	12 – Hansberry	6 – Domask	State Farm Center (15,154); Champaign, IL
October 29, 2023*; 5:00 p.m., BTN	No. 25	No. 1 Kansas; Maui Strong Fund game	W 82–75		28 – Shannon Jr.	9 – Guerrier	3 – Rodgers	State Farm Center (12,592); Champaign, IL
Regular season
November 6, 2023*; 7:00 p.m., B1G+	No. 25	Eastern Illinois	W 80–52	1–0	18 – Gibbs-Lawhorn	8 – Hansberry	3 – Tied	State Farm Center (15,014); Champaign, IL
November 10, 2023*; 7:00 p.m., B1G+	No. 25	Oakland	W 64–53	2–0	15 – Shannon Jr.	10 – Guerrier	5 – Tied	State Farm Center (15,544); Champaign, IL
November 14, 2023*; 7:00 p.m., FS1	No. 23	No. 4 Marquette; Gavitt Tipoff Games	L 64–71	2–1	21 – Shannon Jr.	10 – Guerrier	3 – Hawkins	State Farm Center (15,544); Champaign, IL
November 17, 2023*; 7:00 p.m., B1G+	No. 23	Valparaiso	W 87–64	3–1	22 – Shannon Jr.	9 – Harmon	4 – Shannon Jr.	State Farm Center (14,894); Champaign, IL
November 19, 2023*; 7:00 p.m., BTN	No. 23	Southern	W 88–60	4–1	24 – Shannon Jr.	9 – Domask	4 – Shannon Jr.	State Farm Center (12,012); Champaign, IL
November 24, 2023*; 8:00 p.m., BTN		Western Illinois	W 84–52	5–1	19 – Shannon Jr.	15 – Guerrier	4 – Rodgers	State Farm Center (13,051); Champaign, IL
December 2, 2023; 3:00 p.m., BTN	No. 24	at Rutgers	W 76–58	6–1 (1–0)	23 – Shannon Jr.	10 – Shannon Jr.	3 – Tied	Jersey Mike's Arena (8,000); Piscataway, NJ
December 5, 2023*; 5:30 p.m., ESPN	No. 20	vs. No. 11 Florida Atlantic; Jimmy V Classic	W 98–89	7–1	33 – Tied	6 – Domask	3 – Tied	Madison Square Garden (17,873); New York, NY
December 9, 2023*; 11:00 a.m., CBS	No. 20	at No. 17 Tennessee	L 79–86	7–2	22 – Tied	7 – Goode	4 – Hawkins	Thompson–Boling Arena (21,678); Knoxville, TN
December 17, 2023*; 12:00 p.m., BTN	No. 16	Colgate	W 74–57	8–2	16 – Hawkins	8 – Tied	5 – Rodgers	State Farm Center (14,026); Champaign, IL
December 22, 2023*; 8:00 p.m., FS1	No. 13	vs. Missouri; Braggin' Rights	W 97–73	9–2	30 – Shannon Jr.	11 – Shannon Jr.	7 – Domask	Enterprise Center (18,485); St. Louis, MO
December 29, 2023*; 8:00 p.m., BTN	No. 11	Fairleigh Dickinson	W 104–71	10–2	19 – Dainja	15 – Rodgers	11 – Domask	State Farm Center (15,544); Champaign, IL
January 2, 2024; 8:00 p.m., BTN	No. 9	Northwestern; Rivalry	W 96–66	11–2 (2–0)	32 – Domask	10 – Guerrier	6 – Domask	State Farm Center (15,118); Champaign, IL
January 5, 2024; 7:30 p.m., FS1	No. 9	at No. 1 Purdue	L 78–83	11–3 (2–1)	26 – Domask	10 – Guerrier	6 – Hawkins	Mackey Arena (14,876); West Lafayette, IN
January 11, 2024; 8:00 p.m., FS1	No. 10	Michigan State	W 71–68	12–3 (3–1)	15 – Tied	7 – Hawkins	5 – Domask	State Farm Center (14,727); Champaign, IL
January 14, 2024; 1:00 p.m., BTN	No. 10	Maryland	L 67–76	12–4 (3–2)	26 – Domask	7 – Hawkins	5 – Rodgers	State Farm Center (15,544); Champaign, IL
January 18, 2024; 7:30 p.m., FS1	No. 14	at Michigan	W 88–73	13–4 (4–2)	21 – Hawkins	14 – Guerrier	4 – Hawkins	Crisler Center (10,919); Ann Arbor, MI
January 21, 2024; 12:00 p.m., BTN	No. 14	Rutgers	W 86–63	14–4 (5–2)	18 – Harmon	11 – Guerrier	5 – Domask	State Farm Center (15,544); Champaign, IL
January 24, 2024; 8:00 p.m., BTN	No. 10	at Northwestern; Rivalry	L 91–96 ^{OT}	14–5 (5–3)	22 – Tied	13 – Hawkins	6 – Domask	Welsh–Ryan Arena (7,039); Evanston, IL
January 27, 2024; 2:00 p.m., FOX	No. 10	Indiana; Rivalry	W 70–62	15–5 (6–3)	16 – Domask	10 – Domask	4 – Domask	State Farm Center (15,554); Champaign, IL
January 30, 2024; 6:00 p.m., Peacock	No. 14	at Ohio State	W 87–75	16–5 (7–3)	23 – Tied	10 – Rodgers	3 – Shannon Jr.	Value City Arena (10,285); Columbus, OH
February 4, 2024; 5:30 p.m., BTN	No. 14	Nebraska	W 87–84 ^{OT}	17–5 (8–3)	20 – Hawkins	14 – Rodgers	5 – Tied	State Farm Center (15,544); Champaign, IL
February 10, 2024; 1:00 p.m., CBS	No. 10	at Michigan State	L 80–88	17–6 (8–4)	28 – Shannon Jr.	7 – Tied	7 – Hawkins	Breslin Center (14,797); East Lansing, MI
February 13, 2024; 6:00 p.m., Peacock	No. 14	Michigan	W 97–68	18–6 (9–4)	31 – Shannon Jr.	7 – Guerrier	5 – Hawkins	State Farm Center (15,544); Champaign, IL
February 17, 2024; 4:30 p.m., FOX	No. 14	at Maryland	W 85–80	19–6 (10–4)	27 – Shannon Jr.	12 – Domask	3 – Domask	Xfinity Center (17,950); College Park, MD
February 21, 2024; 5:30 p.m., BTN	No. 12	at Penn State; Return to Rec	L 89–90	19–7 (10–5)	35 – Shannon Jr.	11 – Shannon Jr.	6 – Domask	Rec Hall (6,150); University Park, PA
February 24, 2024; 1:15 p.m., BTN	No. 12	Iowa; Rivalry	W 95–85	20–7 (11–5)	30 – Hawkins	8 – Dainja	5 – Hawkins	State Farm Center (15,544); Champaign, IL
February 28, 2024; 8:00 p.m., BTN	No. 13	Minnesota	W 105–97	21–7 (12–5)	29 – Shannon Jr.	7 – Domask	5 – Domask	State Farm Center (15,544); Champaign, IL
March 2, 2024; 12:00 p.m., BTN	No. 13	at Wisconsin	W 91–83	22–7 (13–5)	31 – Domask	8 – Domask	3 – Domask	Kohl Center (17,071); Madison, WI
March 5, 2024; 6:00 p.m., Peacock	No. 12	No. 3 Purdue	L 71–77	22–8 (13–6)	20 – Domask	9 – Hawkins	4 – Domask	State Farm Center (15,544); Champaign, IL
March 10, 2024; 6:00 p.m., FS1	No. 12	at Iowa; Rivalry	W 73–61	23–8 (14–6)	25 – Shannon Jr.	13 – Guerrier	3 – Tied	Carver–Hawkeye Arena (14,998); Iowa City, IA
Big Ten Tournament
March 15, 2024; 5:30 p.m., BTN	(2) No. 13	vs. (10) Ohio State; Quarterfinals	W 77–74	24–8	28 – Shannon Jr.	10 – Rodgers	4 – Domask	Target Center (12,675); Minneapolis, MN
March 16, 2024; 2:30 p.m., CBS	(2) No. 13	vs. (3) Nebraska; Semifinals	W 98–87	25–8	40 – Shannon Jr.	13 – Rodgers	8 – Domask	Target Center (14,138); Minneapolis, MN
March 17, 2024; 2:30 p.m., CBS	(2) No. 13	vs. (5) Wisconsin; Championship	W 93–87	26–8	34 – Shannon Jr.	7 – Tied	8 – Domask	Target Center (13,991); Minneapolis, MN
NCAA tournament
March 21, 2024*; 2:10 p.m., TruTV	(3 E) No. 10	vs. (14 E) Morehead State; First Round	W 85–69	27–8	26 – Shannon Jr.	11 – Domask	10 – Domask	CHI Health Center (17,239); Omaha, NE
March 23, 2024*; 7:40 p.m., TNT	(3 E) No. 10	vs. (11 E) Duquesne; Second Round	W 89–63	28–8	30 – Shannon Jr.	7 – Hawkins	7 – Domask	CHI Health Center (17,387); Omaha, NE
March 28, 2024*; 9:14 p.m., TBS/TruTV	(3 E) No. 10	vs. (2 E) No. 4 Iowa State; Sweet Sixteen	W 72–69	29–8	29 – Shannon Jr.	6 – Tied	5 – Domask	TD Garden (19,144); Boston, MA
March 30, 2024*; 5:09 p.m., TBS/TruTV	(3 E) No. 10	vs. (1 E) No. 1 UConn; Elite Eight	L 52–77	29–9	17 – Domask	6 – Goode	3 – Shannon Jr.	TD Garden (19,181); Boston, MA
*Non-conference game. ^{#}Rankings from AP Poll. (#) Tournament seedings in parentheses. E=East. All times are in Central Time.

== Rankings ==
Ranking movements Legend: ██ Increase in ranking ██ Decrease in ranking RV = Received votes
	Week																				
Poll	Pre	1	2	3	4	5	6	7	8	9	10	11	12	13	14	15	16	17	18	19	Final
AP	25	23	RV	24	20	16	13	11	9	10	14	10	14	10	14	12	13	12	13	10	6
Coaches	RV	23	22	24	18	16	11	9	8	10	14	11	14	12	14	12	16	12	14	10	7
