= 2023–24 Northwestern Wildcats men's basketball team =

American college basketball season

2023–24 Northwestern Wildcats men's basketball

NCAA tournament, Second Round
- Conference: Big Ten Conference
- Record: 22–12 (12–8 Big Ten)
- Head coach: Chris Collins (11th season)
- Assistant coaches: Chris Lowery; Talor Battle; Bryant McIntosh
- Home arena: Welsh–Ryan Arena

2023–24 Big Ten Conference men's basketball standings
	Conf.				Overall
Team	W		L	PCT	W		L	PCT
No. 2 Purdue	17	–	3	.850	34	–	5	.872
No. 6 Illinois †	14	–	6	.700	29	–	9	.763
Nebraska	12	–	8	.600	23	–	11	.676
Northwestern	12	–	8	.600	22	–	12	.647
Wisconsin	11	–	9	.550	22	–	14	.611
Indiana	10	–	10	.500	19	–	14	.576
Iowa	10	–	10	.500	19	–	15	.559
Michigan State	10	–	10	.500	20	–	15	.571
Minnesota	9	–	11	.450	19	–	15	.559
Ohio State	9	–	11	.450	22	–	14	.611
Penn State	9	–	11	.450	16	–	17	.485
Maryland	7	–	13	.350	16	–	17	.485
Rutgers	7	–	13	.350	15	–	17	.469
Michigan	3	–	17	.150	8	–	24	.250
† 2024 Big Ten tournament winner Rankings from AP poll

The 2023–24 Northwestern Wildcats men's basketball team represented Northwestern University in the 2023–24 NCAA Division I men's basketball season. They were led by 11th-year head coach Chris Collins. The Wildcats played their home games at Welsh–Ryan Arena in Evanston, Illinois as members of the Big Ten Conference.

== Previous season ==
The Wildcats finished the 2022–23 season 21–10, 12–8 in Big Ten play to finish in a tie for second place, their highest finish since the 1958–59 season. This season was also notable as the first time Northwestern defeated a number-one ranked opponent, during a home game against Purdue on February 12. As the No. 2 seed in the Big Ten tournament, they were upset in the quarterfinals by No. 10 seed Penn State. The Wildcats received an at-large bid to the NCAA tournament, their second-ever appearance, as the No. 7 seed in the West Region. The Wildcats defeated Boise State in the first round before falling to UCLA in the second round, closing their season with an overall record of 22–12.

== Offseason ==
=== Departures ===
Name	Number	Pos.	Height	Weight	Year	Hometown	Reason for departure
Chase Audige	1	G	6'4"	200	RS Senior	Coram, NY	Graduated/undrafted in 2023 NBA draft; signed with the Washington Wizards
Julian Roper	5	G	6'3"	180	Sophomore	Detroit, MI	Transferred to Notre Dame
Tydus Verhoeven	10	F	6'9"	235	GS Senior	Manteca, CA	Graduated
Robbie Beran	31	F	6'9"	215	Senior	Richmond, VA	Graduate transferred to Virginia Tech
Roy Dixon III	53	G	5'11"	170	Senior	Atlanta, GA	Walk-on; graduated

=== Incoming transfers ===
Name	Number	Pos.	Height	Weight	Year	Hometown	Previous college
Ryan Langborg	5	G	6'4"	196	GS Senior	San Diego, CA	Princeton
Justin Mullins	20	G	6'6"	190	Sophomore	Oak Park, IL	Denver
Blake Preston	32	F	6'9"	230	GS Senior	Charlotte, NC	Liberty

=== Recruiting classes ===
==== 2023 recruiting class ====
College recruiting information
Name	Hometown	School	Height	Weight	Commit date
Jordan Clayton #44 PG	Medford, MA	Bradford Christian School	6 ft 0 in (1.83 m)	180 lb (82 kg)	Aug 12, 2022
Jordan Clayton #44 PG	Recruit ratings: Rivals: 247Sports: ESPN: (80)				
Parker Strauss; PG	Newport Beach, CA	Pacifica Christian School	6 ft 4 in (1.93 m)	175 lb (79 kg)	Oct 3, 2022
Parker Strauss; PG	Recruit ratings: Rivals: 247Sports: ESPN: (NR)				
Blake Barkley; PF	Putnam, CT	Putnam Science Academy	6 ft 8 in (2.03 m)	190 lb (86 kg)	Jan 10, 2023
Blake Barkley; PF	Recruit ratings: Rivals: 247Sports: ESPN: (NR)				
Overall recruit ranking:
Note: In many cases, Scout, Rivals, 247Sports, On3, and ESPN may conflict in their listings of height and weight.; In these cases, the average was taken. ESPN grades are on a 100-point scale.; Sources: "2023 Northwestern Commits". Rivals.; "2023 Team Ranking". Rivals.

==== 2024 recruiting class ====
College recruiting information (2024)
Name	Hometown	School	Height	Weight	Commit date
K.J. Windham #27 PG	Indianapolis, IN	Ben Davis High School	6 ft 1 in (1.85 m)	175 lb (79 kg)	Aug 5, 2023
K.J. Windham #27 PG	Recruit ratings: Rivals: 247Sports: ESPN: (79)				
Angelo Ciaravino; SF	Chicago, IL	Mount Carmel High School	6 ft 5 in (1.96 m)	175 lb (79 kg)	Aug 9, 2023
Angelo Ciaravino; SF	Recruit ratings: Rivals: 247Sports: ESPN: (NR)				
Overall recruit ranking:
Note: In many cases, Scout, Rivals, 247Sports, On3, and ESPN may conflict in their listings of height and weight.; In these cases, the average was taken. ESPN grades are on a 100-point scale.; Sources: "2024 Northwestern Commits". Rivals.; "2024 Team Ranking". Rivals.

== Roster ==
2023–24 Northwestern Wildcats men's basketball team
Players
Coaches

Pos.	#	Name	Height	Weight	Year	Previous school	Hometown
G	0	Boo Buie	6 ft 2 in (1.88 m)	180 lb (82 kg)	GS	Gould Academy	Albany, New York
F	2	Nick Martinelli	6 ft 7 in (2.01 m)	200 lb (91 kg)	So	Glenbrook South High School	Glenview, Illinois
G	3	Ty Berry	6 ft 3 in (1.91 m)	185 lb (84 kg)	Sr	Sunrise Christian Academy	Newton, Kansas
F	4	Blake Barkley	6 ft 7 in (2.01 m)	210 lb (95 kg)	Fr	Putnam Science Academy	Morgantown, West Virginia
G	5	Ryan Langborg	6 ft 4 in (1.93 m)	195 lb (88 kg)	GS	Princeton	San Diego, California
G	10	Parker Strauss	6 ft 3 in (1.91 m)	180 lb (82 kg)	Fr	Pacifica Christian High School	Costa Mesa, California
G	11	Jordan Clayton	6 ft 2 in (1.88 m)	180 lb (82 kg)	Fr	Bradford Christian Academy	Medford, Massachusetts
G	13	Brooks Barnhizer	6 ft 6 in (1.98 m)	215 lb (98 kg)	Jr	Jefferson High School	Lafayette, Indiana
G	20	Justin Mullins	6 ft 4 in (1.93 m)	190 lb (86 kg)	So	Denver	Oak Park, Illinois
F	32	Blake Preston	6 ft 9 in (2.06 m)	240 lb (109 kg)	GS	Liberty	Charlotte, North Carolina
F	33	Luke Hunger	6 ft 10 in (2.08 m)	255 lb (116 kg)	So	Northfield Mount Hermon School	Montreal, Quebec
C	34	Matthew Nicholson	7 ft 0 in (2.13 m)	255 lb (116 kg)	Sr	Clarkston High School	Clarkston, Michigan
G	43	Blake Smith (W)	6 ft 6 in (1.98 m)	175 lb (79 kg)	So	Germantown Academy	Blue Bell, Pennsylvania
F	54	Gus Hurlburt (W)	6 ft 9 in (2.06 m)	210 lb (95 kg)	So	Enderlin High School	Enderlin, North Dakota

Head coach

- Chris Collins (Duke)

Assistant coach(es)

- Chris Lowery (Southern Illinois)
- Talor Battle (Penn State)
- Bryant McIntosh (Northwestern)

Legend

- (C) Team captain
- (S) Suspended
- (I) Ineligible
- (W) Walk-on
- Injured
- Current redshirt

Roster

== Schedule and results ==
Date time, TV	Rank^{#}	Opponent^{#}	Result	Record	High points	High rebounds	High assists	Site (attendance) city, state
Exhibition
November 1, 2023*; 7:00 p.m., BTN Plus		McKendree	W 85–63		29 – Barnhizer	7 – Barnhizer	9 – Buie	Welsh–Ryan Arena; Evanston, IL
Regular season
November 6, 2023*; 7:00 p.m., BTN Plus		Binghamton	W 72–61	1–0	27 – Buie	13 – Barnhizer	4 – Nicholson	Welsh–Ryan Arena (4,170); Evanston, IL
November 10, 2023*; 7:30 p.m., BTN		Dayton	W 71–66	2–0	19 – Langborg	10 – Barnhizer	4 – Buie	Welsh–Ryan Arena (5,769); Evanston, IL
November 14, 2023*; 7:00 p.m., BTN Plus		Western Michigan	W 63–59	3–0	21 – Buie	7 – Barnhizer	5 – Buie	Welsh–Ryan Arena (4,143); Evanston, IL
November 18, 2023*; 1:30 p.m., ESPN+		vs. Rhode Island; Hall of Fame Tip-Off semifinals	W 72–61	4–0	18 – Barnhizer	9 – Tied	5 – Preston	Mohegan Sun Arena (5,112); Uncasville, CT
November 19, 2023*; 12:00 p.m., ESPN2		vs. Mississippi State; Hall of Fame Tip-Off championship	L 57–66	4–1	14 – Berry	8 – Buie	4 – Langborg	Mohegan Sun Arena; Uncasville, CT
November 27, 2023*; 7:00 p.m., BTN Plus		Northern Illinois	W 89–67	5–1	23 – Buie	8 – Barnhizer	7 – Buie	Welsh–Ryan Arena (4,564); Evanston, IL
December 1, 2023; 8:00 p.m., BTN		No. 1 Purdue	W 92–88 ^{OT}	6–1 (1–0)	31 – Buie	5 – Tied	9 – Buie	Welsh–Ryan Arena (7,039); Evanston, IL
December 10, 2023*; 1:00 p.m., BTN Plus		Detroit Mercy	W 91–59	7–1	22 – Martinelli	9 – Barnhizer	8 – Buie	Welsh–Ryan Arena (4,550); Evanston, IL
December 13, 2023*; 7:00 p.m., BTN	No. 25	Chicago State	L 73–75	7–2	23 – Buie	6 – Tied	8 – Buie	Welsh–Ryan Arena (4,153); Evanston, IL
December 16, 2023*; 4:30 p.m., FS1	No. 25	at DePaul	W 56–46	8–2	16 – Martinelli	7 – Barnhizer	5 – Langborg	Wintrust Arena (4,957); Chicago, IL
December 20, 2023*; 7:30 p.m., ESPN2		vs. Arizona State; Jerry Colangelo Classic	W 65–46	9–2	22 – Buie	10 – Berry	3 – Tied	Footprint Center; Phoenix, AZ
December 29, 2023*; 7:00 p.m., Peacock		Jackson State	W 74–63	10–2	20 – Berry	7 – Barnhizer	5 – Tied	Welsh–Ryan Arena (4,938); Evanston, IL
January 2, 2024; 8:00 p.m., BTN		at No. 9 Illinois; Rivalry	L 66–96	10–3 (1–1)	20 – Buie	5 – Martinelli	4 – Langborg	State Farm Center (15,118); Champaign, IL
January 7, 2024; 6:30 p.m., BTN		Michigan State	W 88–74	11–3 (2–1)	22 – Berry	7 – Barnhizer	10 – Buie	Welsh–Ryan Arena (7,039); Evanston, IL
January 10, 2024; 5:30 p.m., BTN		at Penn State	W 76–72	12–3 (3–1)	23 – Barnhizer	5 – 2 tied	8 – Buie	Bryce Jordan Center (7,822); University Park, PA
January 13, 2024; 11:00 a.m., BTN		at No. 15 Wisconsin	L 63–71	12–4 (3–2)	22 – Buie	6 – Martinelli	4 – Barnhizer	Kohl Center (17,071); Madison, WI
January 17, 2024; 8:00 p.m., BTN		Maryland	W 72–69	13–4 (4–2)	20 – Buie	7 – Berry	7 – Buie	Welsh–Ryan Arena (5,462); Evanston, IL
January 20, 2024; 1:15 p.m., BTN		at Nebraska	L 69–75	13–5 (4–3)	24 – Barnhizer	7 – Barnhizer	7 – Buie	Pinnacle Bank Arena (14,977); Lincoln, NE
January 24, 2024; 8:00 p.m., BTN		No. 10 Illinois; Rivalry	W 96–91 ^{OT}	14–5 (5–3)	29 – Buie	8 – Nicholson	7 – Buie	Welsh–Ryan Arena (7,039); Evanston, IL
January 27, 2024; 7:30 p.m., BTN		Ohio State	W 83–58	15–5 (6–3)	19 – Buie	5 – 2 tied	6 – Barnhizer	Welsh–Ryan Arena (6,218); Evanston, IL
January 31, 2024; 5:30 p.m., BTN		at No. 2 Purdue	L 96–105 ^{OT}	15–6 (6–4)	25 – Buie	5 – Buie	8 – Buie	Mackey Arena (14,876); West Lafayette, IN
February 3, 2024; 1:00 p.m., BTN		at Minnesota	L 66–75 ^{OT}	15–7 (6–5)	20 – Buie	10 – Barnhizer	7 – Buie	Williams Arena (9,492); Minneapolis, MN
February 7, 2024; 8:00 p.m., BTN		Nebraska	W 80–68	16–7 (7–5)	22 – Buie	10 – Barnhizer	6 – Langborg	Welsh–Ryan Arena (5,681); Evanston, IL
February 11, 2024; 12:00 p.m., BTN		Penn State	W 68–63	17–7 (8–5)	15 – Buie	9 – Barnhizer	6 – Buie	Welsh–Ryan Arena (5,541); Evanston, IL
February 15, 2024; 5:30 p.m., BTN		at Rutgers	L 60–63	17–8 (8–6)	27 – Buie	14 – Barnhizer	2 – Barnhizer	Jersey Mike's Arena (8,000); Piscataway, NJ
February 18, 2024; 2:00 p.m., FS1		at Indiana	W 76–72	18–8 (9–6)	26 – Langborg	16 – Nicholson	6 – Langborg	Simon Skjodt Assembly Hall (17,222); Bloomington, IN
February 22, 2024; 8:00 p.m., FS1		Michigan	W 76−62	19−8 (10−6)	20 – Langborg	12 – Barnhizer	7 – Buie	Welsh–Ryan Arena (6,400); Evanston, IL
February 28, 2024; 6:00 p.m., BTN		at Maryland	W 68–61	20–8 (11–6)	27 – Martinelli	10 – Barnhizer	5 – Buie	Xfinity Center (12,340); College Park, MD
March 2, 2024; 4:30 p.m., BTN		Iowa	L 80–87	20–9 (11–7)	27 – Buie	6 – Barnhizer	7 – Buie	Welsh–Ryan Arena (7,039); Evanston, IL
March 6, 2024; 6:00 p.m., BTN		at Michigan State	L 49–53	20–10 (11–8)	15 – Buie	12 – Barnhizer	4 – Hunger	Breslin Center (14,797); East Lansing, MI
March 9, 2024; 8:00 p.m., BTN		Minnesota	W 90–66	21–10 (12–8)	23 – Tied	6 – Barnhizer	6 – Tied	Welsh–Ryan Arena (7,039); Evanston, IL
Big Ten tournament
March 15, 2024; 1:30 p.m., BTN	(4)	vs. (5) Wisconsin; Quarterfinals	L 61–70	21–11	29 – Buie	14 – Barnhizer	3 – Tied	Target Center; Minneapolis, MN
NCAA tournament
March 22, 2024*; 11:15 a.m., CBS	(9 E)	vs. (8 E) Florida Atlantic; First Round	W 77–65 ^{OT}	22–11	27 – Langborg	10 – Barnhizer	4 – Tied	Barclays Center; Brooklyn, NY
March 24, 2024*; 6:45 p.m., TruTV	(9 E)	vs. (1 E) No. 1 UConn; Second Round	L 58–75	22–12	18 – Barnhizer	7 – Hunger	4 – Buie	Barclays Center (17,505); Brooklyn, NY
*Non-conference game. ^{#}Rankings from AP Poll. (#) Tournament seedings in parentheses. E=East. All times are in Central Time.

== Rankings ==
Ranking movements Legend: ██ Increase in ranking ██ Decrease in ranking — = Not ranked RV = Received votes
	Week																				
Poll	Pre	1	2	3	4	5	6	7	8	9	10	11	12	13	14	15	16	17	18	19	Final
AP	—	—	—	—	RV	25	RV	RV	RV	RV	—	—	RV	—	RV	—	RV	—	—	—	RV
Coaches	—	—	—	—	RV	RV	—	—	—	RV	—	—	RV	RV	RV	—	RV	RV	RV	—	RV
