= 2023–24 Nebraska Cornhuskers men's basketball team =

American college basketball season

2023–24 Nebraska Cornhuskers men's basketball

NCAA tournament, First Round
- Conference: Big Ten Conference
- Record: 23–11 (12–8 Big Ten)
- Head coach: Fred Hoiberg (5th season)
- Assistant coaches: Adam Howard; Nate Loenser; Ernie Zeigler
- Home arena: Pinnacle Bank Arena

2023–24 Big Ten Conference men's basketball standings
	Conf.				Overall
Team	W		L	PCT	W		L	PCT
No. 2 Purdue	17	–	3	.850	34	–	5	.872
No. 6 Illinois †	14	–	6	.700	29	–	9	.763
Nebraska	12	–	8	.600	23	–	11	.676
Northwestern	12	–	8	.600	22	–	12	.647
Wisconsin	11	–	9	.550	22	–	14	.611
Indiana	10	–	10	.500	19	–	14	.576
Iowa	10	–	10	.500	19	–	15	.559
Michigan State	10	–	10	.500	20	–	15	.571
Minnesota	9	–	11	.450	19	–	15	.559
Ohio State	9	–	11	.450	22	–	14	.611
Penn State	9	–	11	.450	16	–	17	.485
Maryland	7	–	13	.350	16	–	17	.485
Rutgers	7	–	13	.350	15	–	17	.469
Michigan	3	–	17	.150	8	–	24	.250
† 2024 Big Ten tournament winner Rankings from AP poll

The 2023–24 Nebraska Cornhuskers men's basketball team represented the University of Nebraska–Lincoln in the 2023–24 NCAA Division I men's basketball season. The Cornhuskers, led by fifth-year head coach Fred Hoiberg, played their home games at Pinnacle Bank Arena in Lincoln, Nebraska as members of the Big Ten Conference. On March 3 against the Rutgers Scarlet Knights, Nebraska broke the school's season record for 3 pointers, and finished Big Ten play undefeated at home, including a win against then top ranked Purdue. The Nebraska Cornhuskers men's basketball team drew an average home attendance of 14,597 in 19 games in 2023-24.

== Previous season ==
The Cornhuskers finished the 2022–23 season 16–16, 9–11 in Big Ten play to finish tied for 11th place. As the No. 12 seed in the Big Ten Tournament, the Cornhuskers lost in the first round to No. 14 seed Minnesota.

== Offseason ==
=== Departures ===
Name	No.	Pos.	Height	Weight	Year	Hometown	Notes
Emmanuel Bandoumel	25	G	6'4"	187	Sr	Quebec City, QC, Canada	Graduated
Wilhelm Breidenbach	32	F	6'10"	231	So	Rancho Santa Margarita, CA	Transferred to Washington
Denim Dawson	12	G/F	6'6"	193	RFr	San Bernardino, CA	Transferred to Tennessee State
Sam Griesel	5	G	6'7"	216	Sr	Lincoln, NE	Graduated
Oleg Kojenets	33	F	7'0"	232	RFr	Kaunas, Lithuania	Transferred to Wyoming
Quaran McPherson	3	G	6'3"	197	Fr	Queens, New York City, NY	Transferred to Northern Illinois
Derrick Walker	13	F	6'9"	245	Sr	Kansas City, MO	Graduated

=== Incoming transfers ===
Name	No.	Pos.	Height	Weight	Year	Hometown	Previous school
Josiah Allick	53	F	6'8"	231	Sr	Lincoln, NE	New Mexico
Jarron Coleman	9	G	6'5"	213	Sr	Indianapolis, IN	Ball State
Rienk Mast	51	F	6'10"	248	Jr	Groningen, Netherlands	Bradley
Ahron Ulis	5	G	6'3"	190	Jr	Chicago Heights, IL	Iowa
Brice Williams	3	F	6'7"	213	Jr	Huntersville, NC	Charlotte

=== 2023 recruiting class ===
College recruiting
Name	Hometown	School	Height	Weight	Commit date
Eli Rice; F	Bradenton, FL	IMG Academy	6 ft 6 in (1.98 m)	190 lb (86 kg)	Aug 10, 2022
Eli Rice; F	Recruit ratings: Rivals: 247Sports: On3:				
Overall recruit ranking:
Note: In many cases, Scout, Rivals, 247Sports, On3, and ESPN may conflict in their listings of height and weight.; In these cases, the average was taken. ESPN grades are on a 100-point scale.; Sources: "2023 Team Ranking". Rivals.

== Roster ==
2023–24 Nebraska Cornhuskers men's basketball team
Players
Coaches

Pos.	#	Name	Height	Weight	Year	Previous school	Hometown
G	0	C.J. Wilcher	6 ft 5 in (1.96 m)	214 lb (97 kg)	Jr	Xavier	Plainfield, NJ
G	1	Sam Hoiberg (W)	6 ft 0 in (1.83 m)	183 lb (83 kg)	RS So	Pius X HS	Lincoln, NE
G	2	Ramel Lloyd Jr.	6 ft 6 in (1.98 m)	210 lb (95 kg)	RS Fr	Sierra Canyon HS	Chatsworth, CA
F	3	Brice Williams	6 ft 7 in (2.01 m)	213 lb (97 kg)	Jr	Charlotte	Huntersville, NC
F	4	Juwan Gary	6 ft 6 in (1.98 m)	221 lb (100 kg)	RS Sr	Alabama	Columbia, SC
G	5	Ahron Ulis	6 ft 3 in (1.91 m)	190 lb (86 kg)	Jr	Iowa	Chicago Heights, IL
G	9	Jarron Coleman	6 ft 5 in (1.96 m)	213 lb (97 kg)	Sr	Ball State	Indianapolis, IN
G	10	Jamarques Lawrence	6 ft 3 in (1.91 m)	183 lb (83 kg)	So	Roselle Catholic HS	Plainfield, NJ
G	11	Eli Rice	6 ft 8 in (2.03 m)	213 lb (97 kg)	Fr	IMG Academy	Bradenton, FL
C	15	Blaise Keita	6 ft 11 in (2.11 m)	257 lb (117 kg)	Jr	Coffeyville CC	Bamako, Mali
F	21	Matar Diop	6 ft 10 in (2.08 m)	213 lb (97 kg)	Fr	Keystone Athletic Academy	Dakar, Senegal
G	24	Jeffrey Grace III (W)	6 ft 3 in (1.91 m)	197 lb (89 kg)	RS So	Arizona State	Elmhurst, IL
G	30	Keisei Tominaga	6 ft 2 in (1.88 m)	179 lb (81 kg)	Sr	Ranger College	Nagoya, Japan
G	31	Cale Jacobsen (W)	6 ft 4 in (1.93 m)	200 lb (91 kg)	RS Fr	Ashland-Greenwood HS	Ashland, NE
F	35	Henry Burt (W)	6 ft 7 in (2.01 m)	216 lb (98 kg)	RS Fr	Elkhorn South HS	Omaha, NE
F	51	Rienk Mast	6 ft 10 in (2.08 m)	248 lb (112 kg)	Sr	Bradley	Groningen, Netherlands
F	53	Josiah Allick	6 ft 8 in (2.03 m)	231 lb (105 kg)	Sr	New Mexico	Lincoln, NE

Head coach

- Fred Hoiberg (Iowa State)

Assistant coach(es)

- Adam Howard (Western Kentucky)
- Nate Loenser (Iowa State)
- Ernie Zeigler (Northwood)

Legend

- (C) Team captain
- (S) Suspended
- (I) Ineligible
- (W) Walk-on
- Injured
- Current redshirt

Roster

== Schedule and results ==
Date time, TV	Rank^{#}	Opponent^{#}	Result	Record	High points	High rebounds	High assists	Site (attendance) city, state
Exhibition
October 29, 2023*; 5:00 p.m., BTN Plus		Doane	W 84–53	−	18 – Rice	11 – Lawrence	4 – Jacobsen	Pinnacle Bank Arena (−); Lincoln, NE
Regular Season
November 6, 2023*; 7:00 p.m., BTN Plus		Lindenwood	W 84–52	1–0	15 – Hoiberg	8 – Allick	3 – Mast	Pinnacle Bank Arena (13,478); Lincoln, NE
November 9, 2023*; 7:00 p.m., BTN Plus		Florida A&M	W 81–54	2–0	20 – Mast	16 – Mast	4 – Lawrence	Pinnacle Bank Arena (13,766); Lincoln, NE
November 13, 2023*; 7:00 p.m., BTN		Rider; Cornhusker Classic	W 64–50	3–0	13 – Wilcher	13 – Mast	3 – Williams	Pinnacle Bank Arena (13,478); Lincoln, NE
November 15, 2023*; 7:00 p.m., BTN Plus		Stony Brook; Cornhusker Classic	W 84–63	4–0	19 – Gary	9 – Williams	5 – Mast	Pinnacle Bank Arena (13,614); Lincoln, NE
November 18, 2023*; 3:00 p.m., Peacock		vs. Oregon State	W 84–63	5–0	25 – Williams	13 – Mast	3 – Tied	Sanford Pentagon (2,938); Sioux Falls, SD
November 22, 2023*; 7:00 p.m., BTN		Duquesne; Cornhusker Classic	W 89–79	6–0	23 – Tominaga	7 – Allick	5 – Allick	Pinnacle Bank Arena (14,426); Lincoln, NE
November 26, 2023*; 1:00 p.m., BTN Plus		Cal State Fullerton	W 85–72	7–0	19 – Mast	9 – Mast	6 – Lawrence	Pinnacle Bank Arena (14,171); Lincoln, NE
December 3, 2023*; 3:00 p.m., FS1		No. 15 Creighton; Rivalry	L 60–89	7–1	20 – Tominaga	7 – Tied	2 – Tied	Pinnacle Bank Arena (15,838); Lincoln, NE
December 6, 2023; 8:00 p.m., BTN		at Minnesota	L 65–76	7–2 (0–1)	18 – Williams	7 – Lawrence	4 – Williams	Williams Arena (6,899); Minneapolis, MN
December 10, 2023; 5:30 p.m., BTN		Michigan State	W 77–70	8–2 (1–1)	20 – Gary	14 – Mast	6 – Mast	Pinnacle Bank Arena (14,585); Lincoln, NE
December 17, 2023*; 2:00 p.m., ESPN+		at Kansas State	W 62–46	9–2	19 – Mast	18 – Gary	4 – Tominaga	Bramlage Coliseum (10,206); Manhattan, KS
December 20, 2023*; 6:30 p.m., BTN Plus		North Dakota	W 83–75	10–2	16 – Wilcher	12 – Gary	3 – Tied	Pinnacle Bank Arena (13,387); Lincoln, NE
December 29, 2023*; 6:30 p.m., BTN Plus		South Carolina State	W 91–62	11–2	18 – Wilcher	7 – Tied	6 – Coleman	Pinnacle Bank Arena (14,987); Lincoln, NE
January 3, 2024; 8:00 p.m., BTN		Indiana	W 86–70	12–2 (2–1)	28 – Tominaga	8 – Allick	3 – Tied	Pinnacle Bank Arena (13,446); Lincoln, NE
January 6, 2024; 1:15 p.m., BTN		at No. 21 Wisconsin	L 72–88	12–3 (2–2)	17 – Tominaga	6 – Tied	6 – Williams	Kohl Center (15,055); Madison, WI
January 9, 2024; 8:00 p.m., Peacock		No. 1 Purdue	W 88–72	13–3 (3–2)	19 – Tominaga	11 – Williams	9 – Williams	Pinnacle Bank Arena (14,106); Lincoln, NE
January 12, 2024; 8:00 p.m., BTN		at Iowa	L 76–94	13–4 (3–3)	14 – Tied	6 – Hoiberg	4 – Hoiberg	Carver–Hawkeye Arena (9,670); Iowa City, IA
January 17, 2024; 6:00 p.m., BTN		at Rutgers	L 82–87 ^{OT}	13–5 (3–4)	22 – Williams	8 – Mast	5 – Lawrence	Jersey Mike's Arena (8,000); Piscataway, NJ
January 20, 2024; 1:15 p.m., BTN		Northwestern	W 75–69	14–5 (4–4)	15 – Allick	8 – Mast	6 – Mast	Pinnacle Bank Arena (14,977); Lincoln, NE
January 23, 2024; 6:00 p.m., Peacock		Ohio State	W 83–69	15–5 (5–4)	34 – Mast	10 – Mast	6 – Lawrence	Pinnacle Bank Arena (14,408); Lincoln, NE
January 27, 2024; 11:00 a.m., BTN		at Maryland	L 51–73	15–6 (5–5)	14 – Wilcher	6 – Mast	3 – Mast	Xfinity Center (15,481); College Park, MD
February 1, 2024; 7:30 p.m., BTN		No. 6 Wisconsin	W 80–72 ^{OT}	16–6 (6–5)	22 – Wilcher	9 – Williams	4 – Lawrence	Pinnacle Bank Arena (15,318); Lincoln, NE
February 4, 2024; 5:30 p.m., BTN		at No. 14 Illinois	L 84–87 ^{OT}	16–7 (6–6)	31 – Tominaga	11 – Gary	3 – Tominaga	State Farm Center (15,544); Champaign, IL
February 7, 2024; 8:00 p.m., BTN		at Northwestern	L 68–80	16–8 (6–7)	15 – Gary	10 – Williams	4 – Williams	Welsh–Ryan Arena (5,681); Evanston, IL
February 10, 2024; 5:30 p.m., BTN		Michigan	W 79–59	17–8 (7–7)	19 – Tominaga	8 – Allick	8 – Mast	Pinnacle Bank Arena (15,828); Lincoln, NE
February 17, 2024; 11:00 a.m., BTN		Penn State	W 68–49	18–8 (8–7)	17 – Tominaga	9 – Mast	2 – Tied	Pinnacle Bank Arena (15,751); Lincoln, NE
February 21, 2024; 7:30 p.m., BTN		at Indiana	W 85–70	19–8 (9–7)	20 – Tominaga	6 – Tied	5 – Lawrence	Simon Skjodt Assembly Hall (17,222); Bloomington, IN
February 25, 2024; 5:30 p.m., BTN		Minnesota	W 73–55	20–8 (10–7)	22 – Gary	8 – Tied	3 – Hoiberg	Pinnacle Bank Arena (15,920); Lincoln, NE
February 29, 2024; 5:30 p.m., FS1		at Ohio State	L 69–78	20–9 (10–8)	14 – Tied	12 – Mast	5 – Lawrence	Value City Arena (13,090); Columbus, OH
March 3, 2024; 5:30 p.m., BTN		Rutgers	W 67–56	21–9 (11–8)	18 – Tominaga	12 – Allick	3 – Tied	Pinnacle Bank Arena (15,854); Lincoln, NE
March 10, 2024; 11:00 a.m., BTN		at Michigan	W 85–70	22–9 (12–8)	30 – Tominaga	7 – Gary	4 – Williams	Crisler Center (11,006); Ann Arbor, MI
Big Ten tournament
March 15, 2024; 8:00 p.m., BTN	(3)	vs. (6) Indiana; Quarterfinals	W 93–66	23–9	23 – Tied	9 – Allick	7 – Mast	Target Center (12,675); Minneapolis, MN
March 16, 2024; 2:30 p.m., CBS	(3)	vs. (2) No. 13 Illinois; Semifinals	L 87–98	23–10	23 – Williams	7 – Allick	3 – Williams	Target Center (14,138); Minneapolis, MN
NCAA tournament
March 22, 2024; 5:50 p.m., CBS	(8 S)	vs. (9 S) Texas A&M; First Round	L 83–98	23–11	24 – Williams	11 – Allick	4 – Williams	FedExForum; Memphis, TN
*Non-conference game. ^{#}Rankings from AP Poll. (#) Tournament seedings in parentheses. S=South region. All times are in Central Time.

== Rankings ==
Ranking movements Legend: ██ Increase in ranking ██ Decrease in ranking — = Not ranked RV = Received votes
	Week																				
Poll	Pre	1	2	3	4	5	6	7	8	9	10	11	12	13	14	15	16	17	18	19	Final
AP	—	—	—	RV	—	—	—	—	—	—	—	—	—	—	—	—	RV	—	RV	RV	—
Coaches	—	—	—	—	—	—	RV	RV	RV	—	RV	—	—	—	—	—	RV	RV	RV	RV	—

== See also ==
- 2023–24 Nebraska Cornhuskers women's basketball team
