= Justin Harmon =

American basketball player (born 2001)

No. 4 – Salt Lake City Stars
- Position: Shooting guard
- League: NBA G League

Personal information
- Born: August 30, 2001 (age 25) Chicago, Illinois, U.S.
- Listed height: 6 ft 4 in (1.93 m)
- Listed weight: 180 lb (82 kg)

Career information
- High school: Curie Metropolitan (Chicago, Illinois)
- College: Barton CC (2019–2021); Utah Valley (2021–2023); Illinois (2023–2024)
- NBA draft: 2024: undrafted
- Playing career: 2024–present

Career history
- 2024–present: Salt Lake City Stars

Career highlights
- First-team All-Jayhawk West (2021)
- Stats at Basketball Reference

Justin Harmon (born August 30, 2001) is an American professional basketball player for the Salt Lake City Stars of the NBA G League. He played college basketball for the Barton Cougars, the Utah Valley Wolverines, and the Illinois Fighting Illini.

== College career ==
Harmon spent the first two years of his college career at Barton Community College. He then transferred to Utah Valley University, where he ultimately graduated with his bachelor's degree. Utilizing his fifth year of eligibility thanks to COVID, he transferred to the University of Illinois.

== Professional career ==
After going undrafted in the 2024 NBA draft, Harmon joined the Salt Lake City Stars on October 28, 2024.

On September 23, 2026, Harmon signed an Exhibit 10 contract with the Utah Jazz. He was waived the following day.

== Career statistics ==
Legend
GP	Games played	GS	Games started	MPG	Minutes per game
FG%	Field goal percentage	3P%	3-point field goal percentage	FT%	Free throw percentage
RPG	Rebounds per game	APG	Assists per game	SPG	Steals per game
BPG	Blocks per game	PPG	Points per game	**Bold**	Career high

=== College ===
==== NCAA Division I ====
Year	Team	GP	GS	MPG	FG%	3P%	FT%	RPG	APG	SPG	BPG	PPG
2021–22	Utah Valley	21	7	25.3	.410	.297	.782	**3.8**	1.4	.8	**.6**	10.9
2022–23	Utah Valley	37	**36**	**28.4**	**.453**	**.340**	.729	**3.8**	**2.9**	**1.3**	.2	**14.0**
2023–24	Illinois	**38**	0	18.7	.407	.306	**.915**	2.7	1.1	.4	.2	5.6
Career		**96**	**43**	**23.9**	**.432**	**.321**	**.779**	**3.4**	**1.9**	**.8**	**.3**	**10.0**

==== JUCO ====
Year	Team	GP	GS	MPG	FG%	3P%	FT%	RPG	APG	SPG	BPG	PPG
2019–20	Barton	**32**	21	22.8	**.492**	.300	.752	**4.6**	1.7	1.2	.3	11.1
2020–21	Barton	22	**22**	**29**	**.492**	**.345**	**.822**	**4.6**	**3.5**	**1.4**	**.5**	**16**
Career		**54**	**43**	**25.3**	**.492**	**.327**	**.781**	**4.6**	**2.4**	**1.3**	**.4**	**13.1**

== Personal life ==
Harmon earned a bachelor's degree from Utah Valley in applied communication and is now pursuing a strategic brand communication graduate certificate at the University of Illinois.
