= 2023–24 Big 12 Conference men's basketball season =

- League: NCAA Division I
- Sport: Basketball
- Number of teams: 14
- TV partner(s): ESPN, ESPN2, ESPNU, ESPN+, Longhorn Network, CBS

Regular season
- Regular season champion: Houston (1st title)
- Season MVP: Jamal Shead, Houston

Big 12 tournament
- Venue: T-Mobile Center, Kansas City, Missouri
- Champions: Iowa State (6th title)
- Tournament MVP: Keshon Gilbert, Iowa State

Big 12 men's basketball seasons
- ← 2022–23 2024–25 →

2023–24 Big 12 men's basketball standings
	Conf.				Overall
Team	W		L	PCT	W		L	PCT
No. 3т Houston	15	–	3	.833	32	–	5	.865
No. 8 Iowa State †	13	–	5	.722	29	–	8	.784
No. 16 Baylor	11	–	7	.611	24	–	11	.686
Texas Tech	11	–	7	.611	23	–	11	.676
BYU	10	–	8	.556	23	–	11	.676
No. 19 Kansas	10	–	8	.556	23	–	11	.676
Texas	9	–	9	.500	21	–	13	.618
TCU	9	–	9	.500	21	–	13	.618
Oklahoma	8	–	10	.444	20	–	12	.625
Kansas State	8	–	10	.444	19	–	15	.559
Cincinnati	7	–	11	.389	22	–	15	.595
UCF	7	–	11	.389	17	–	16	.515
Oklahoma State	4	–	14	.222	12	–	20	.375
West Virginia	4	–	14	.222	9	–	23	.281
† 2024 Big 12 tournament winner Rankings from AP poll

The 2023–24 Big 12 men's basketball season began with the start of the 2023–24 NCAA Division I men's basketball season in November. Regular season conference play was played from December 2023 and concluded in March 2023, with Houston winning their first regular season title in their first year in the Big 12. The 2024 Big 12 men's basketball tournament was held March 12–16, 2024, at the T-Mobile Center in Kansas City, Missouri, with Iowa State winning the conference tournament, their sixth overall.

This was the first and only season for the Big 12 Conference with 14 teams before expanding to 16 teams in 2024.

== Coaches ==
=== Coaching changes ===
Coach	School	Reason	Replacement
Mark Adams	Texas Tech	Resigned	Grant McCasland
Bob Huggins	West Virginia	Resigned	Josh Eilert

=== Head coaches ===
Note: Stats are through the beginning of the season. All stats and records are from time at current school only.

Team	Head coach	Previous job	Seasons at school as HC	Overall record at School	Big 12 record	NCAA tournaments	NCAA Final Fours	NCAA Championships
Baylor	Scott Drew	Valparaiso	21st	422–232 (.645)	178–166 (.517)	11	1	1
BYU	Mark Pope	Utah Valley	5th	85–40 (.680)	0–0 (–)	1	0	0
Cincinnati	Wes Miller	UNC Greensboro	3rd	41–28 (.594)	0–0 (–)	0	0	0
Houston	Kelvin Sampson	Houston Rockets (asst.)	10th	232–74 (.758)	0–0 (–)	5	1	0
Iowa State	T. J. Otzelberger	UNLV	3rd	41–27 (.603)	16–20 (.444)	2	0	0
Kansas	Bill Self	Illinois	21st	565–132 (.811)	266–68 (.796)	18†	3†	2
Kansas State	Jerome Tang	Baylor (asst.)	2nd	26–10 (.722)	11–7 (.611)	1	0	0
Oklahoma	Porter Moser	Loyola Chicago	3rd	34–33 (.507)	12–24 (.333)	0	0	0
Oklahoma State	Mike Boynton	Oklahoma State (asst.)	7th	107–90 (.543)	47–61 (.435)	1	0	0
TCU	Jamie Dixon	Pittsburgh	8th	139–97 (.589)	51–73 (.411)	3	0	0
Texas	Rodney Terry*	Texas (asst.)	1st	22–8 (.733)	12–6 (.667)	1	0	0
Texas Tech	Grant McCasland	North Texas	1st	0–0 (–)	0–0 (–)	0	0	0
UCF	Johnny Dawkins	Stanford	8th	131–87 (.601)	0–0 (–)	1	0	0
West Virginia	Josh Eilert	West Virginia (asst.)	1st	0–0 (–)	0–0 (–)	0	0	0

† All of the Jayhawks postseason victories and 7 of their regular season wins were vacated from the 2017-18 season. Officially, their record for the season 16-8 overall and 3-5 in conference play. The Jayhawks regular season Big 12 championship and their Big 12 Tournament championship were vacated. The Jayhawks entire NCAA Tournament appearance from the season was vacated including their Final Four appearance.

* Terry was named interim coach during the 2022-23 season and officially named head coach at season end.

== Preseason ==
Big 12 Preseason Poll

	Big 12 Coaches	Points
1.	Kansas (12)	168
2.	Houston (2)	153
3.	Texas	143
4.	Baylor	137
5.	TCU	113
6.	Kansas State	106
7.	Iowa State	95
8.	Texas Tech	80
9.	West Virginia	70
10.	Oklahoma State	57
11.	Cincinnati	55
12.	Oklahoma	54
13.	BYU	29
14.	UCF	14
Reference: (#) first place votes

Pre-Season All-Big 12 Team

Big 12 Coaches
L.J. Cryer, G Houston
Hunter Dickinson, C Kansas
Dejuan Harris Jr., G Kansas
Emanuel Miller, F TCU
Max Abmas, G Texas
† denotes unanimous selection

- Player of the Year: Hunter Dickinson, Kansas
- Newcomer of the Year: Hunter Dickinson, Kansas
- Freshman of the Year: Ja’Kobe Walter, Baylor

=== Recruiting classes ===
Rankings
Team	ESPN	Rivals	247 Sports	On3	Signees
Baylor	-	14	12	5	4
BYU	-	-	-	-	-
Cincinnati	-	21	35	24	3
Houston	-	-	24	29	3
Iowa State	-	5	7	12	5
Kansas	9	12	9	14	4
Kansas State	-	18	23	25	3
Oklahoma	-	28	38	30	2
Oklahoma State	-	7	10	17	5
TCU	-	-	53	53	2
Texas	-	34	43	43	2
Texas Tech	-	54	78	89	2
UCF	-	51	93	-	2
West Virginia	-	-	-	-	-

=== Preseason watchlists ===
Below is a table of notable preseason watch lists.

Player	Wooden	Naismith	Cousy	West	Erving	Malone	Abdul-Jabbar	Olson
Max Abmas	✓	✓	✓					
Jalen Bridges					✓			
LJ Cryer	✓	✓		✓				✓
Hunter Dickinson	✓	✓					✓	✓
Jesse Edwards							✓	
Johnny Furphy					✓			
Dajuan Harris Jr.	✓	✓	✓					
Arthur Kaluma					✓			
Kevin McCullar	✓	✓		✓				✓
Tylor Perry		✓						
J'Wan Roberts						✓		
Jamal Shead	✓	✓	✓					✓
Fousseyni Traore						✓		
Ja'Kobe Walter	✓			✓				✓

=== Preseason All-American teams ===
Player	AP
Hunter Dickinson	1st

=== Preseason national polls/ratings ===
	247 Sports	AP	Blue Ribbon; Yearbook	CBS Sports	Coaches	ESPN	Kenpom	NCAA Sports	Sports; Illustrated
Baylor		20		18	17	17	7	HM	21
BYU							36		
Cincinnati							53		
Houston	7	7		7	6	6	3	13	5
Iowa State					RV		31	HM	
Kansas	1	1		1	1	1	2	1	2
Kansas State		RV			RV		25	HM	
Oklahoma							48		
Oklahoma State							68		
TCU	21	RV			RV		30	HM	
Texas	17	18		20	18	21	16	11	HM
Texas Tech							43		
UCF							72		
West Virginia							64	25	18

== Regular season ==
=== Conference matrix ===
	Baylor	BYU	Cincinnati	Houston	Iowa State	Kansas	Kansas State	Oklahoma	Oklahoma State	TCU	Texas	Texas Tech	UCF	West Virginia
vs. Baylor	—	1–1	0–1	1–0	0–1	1–1	1–0	0–1	0–1	1–1	1–1	1–1	0–1	0–1
vs. BYU	1–1	—	1–0	1–0	1–1	0–1	1–1	1–0	1–1	0–1	0–1	1–0	0–2	0–1
vs. Cincinnati	1–0	0–1	—	2–0	1–0	1–0	0–1	2–0	1–0	1–1	1–0	0–1	0–2	1–1
vs. Houston	0–1	0–1	0–2	—	1–1	1–1	0–1	0–1	0–1	1–0	0–2	0–1	0–2	0–1
vs. Iowa State	1–0	1–1	0–1	1–1	—	0–1	1–1	1–1	0–1	0–2	0–1	0–1	0–1	0–1
vs. Kansas	1–1	1–0	0–1	1–1	1–0	—	1–1	0–2	0–2	0–1	0–1	1–0	1–0	1–0
vs. Kansas State	0–1	1–1	1–0	1–0	1–1	1–1	—	1–0	1–1	1–0	1–0	1–0	0–1	0–2
vs. Oklahoma	1–0	0–1	0–2	1–0	1–1	2–0	0–1	—	0–2	1–0	2–0	1–0	1–0	0–1
vs. Oklahoma State	1–0	1–1	0–1	1–0	1–0	2–0	1–1	2–0	—	1–0	1–0	2–0	1–0	0–1
vs. TCU	1–1	1–0	1–1	0–1	2–0	1–0	0–1	0–1	0–1	—	1–0	1–1	1–0	0–2
vs. Texas	1–1	1–0	0–1	2–0	1–0	1–0	0–1	0–2	0–1	0–1	—	1–1	1–0	1–1
vs. Texas Tech	1–1	0–1	1–0	1–0	1–0	0–1	0–1	0–1	0–2	1–1	1–1	—	1–1	0–1
vs. UCF	1–0	2–0	2–0	2–0	1–0	0–1	1–0	0–1	0–1	0–1	0–1	1–1	—	1–1
vs. West Virginia	1–0	1–0	1–1	1–0	1–0	0–1	2–0	1–0	1–0	2–0	1–1	1–0	1–1	—
Total	11–7	10–8	7–11	15–3	13–5	10–8	8–10	8–10	4–14	9–9	9–9	11–7	7–11	4–14

Thru Mar. 9, 2024.

=== Big East-Big 12 Battle ===
Date	Time	Big East team	Big 12 team	Score	Location	Television	Attendance	Leader
Thu., Nov. 30	5:30 PM	Butler	Texas Tech	103–95 ^{OT}	Hinkle Fieldhouse • Indianapolis, IN	FS1	7,893	Big East (1–0)
Thu., Nov. 30	7:00 PM	No. 15 Creighton	Oklahoma State	79–65	Gallagher-Iba Arena • Stillwater, OK	ESPN2	6,309	Big East (2–0)
Fri., Dec. 1	5:30 PM	Xavier	No. 6 Houston	66–60	Cintas Center • Cincinnati, OH	FS1	10,472	Big East (2–1)
Fri., Dec. 1	6:00 PM	St. John's	West Virginia	79–73	WVU Coliseum • Morgantown, WV	ESPN2	10,781	Big East (3–1)
Fri., Dec. 1	7:30 PM	DePaul	Iowa State	99–80	Wintrust Arena • Chicago, IL	FS1	4,852	Big East (3–2)
Fri., Dec. 1	8:00 PM	No. 4 UConn	No. 5 Kansas	69–65	Allen Fieldhouse • Lawrence, KS	ESPN2	16,300	Tied (3–3)
Sat., Dec. 2	4:30 PM	Georgetown	TCU	84–83	Capital One Arena • Washington, D.C.	FS1	7,910	Big 12 (4–3)
Tue., Dec. 5	6:00 PM	Villanova	Kansas State	72–71 ^{OT}	Bramlage Coliseum • Manhattan, KS	ESPN2	10,140	Big 12 (5–3)
Tue., Dec. 5	6:00 PM	Providence	No. 19 Oklahoma	72–51	Lloyd Noble Center • Norman, OK	ESPNU	7,234	Big 12 (6–3)
Tue., Dec. 5	8:00 PM	Seton Hall	No. 6 Baylor	78–60	Ferrell Center • Waco, TX	ESPN2	8,269	Big 12 (7–3)
Wed., Dec. 6	7:00 PM	No. 8 Marquette	No. 12 Texas	86–65	Fiserv Forum • Milwaukee, WI	FS1	16,733	Big 12 (7–4)
WINNERS ARE IN BOLD. HOME TEAM IN ITALICS. All times Central. Rankings from AP Poll released prior to the game. Did not participate: BYU, Cincinnati, UCF

=== Multi-Team Events ===
Team	Event	Place/Finish
Baylor	NIT Season Tip-Off	1st
BYU	Vegas Showdown	1st
Cincinnati	None	
Houston	Charleston Classic	1st
Iowa State	ESPN Events Invitational	4th
Kansas	Maui Invitational	3rd
Kansas State	Baha Mar Hoops Bahamas Championship	2nd
Oklahoma	Rady Children’s Invitational	1st
Oklahoma State	Legends Classic	4th
TCU	Diamond Head Classic	3rd
Texas	Empire Classic	2nd
Texas Tech	Battle 4 Atlantis	5th
UCF	Jacksonville Classic (Coast Bracket)	1st
West Virginia	Fort Myers Tip-Off	4th

=== Big 12 Players of the Week ===
Week	Player of the week	Newcomer of the week
November 13, 2023	Ja'Kobe Walter, G, Baylor	Hunter Dickinson, C, Kansas
November 20, 2023	Hunter Dickinson, C, Kansas	Hunter Dickinson (2), C, Kansas
November 27, 2023	Kevin McCullar Jr., G, Kansas	RayJ Dennis, G, Baylor; Jaylin Sellers, G, UCF
December 4, 2023	Emanuel Miller, F, TCU	Chance McMillian, G, Texas Tech
December 11, 2023	Arthur Kaluma, F, Kansas State	Keshon Gilbert, G, Iowa State
December 18, 2023	Micah Peavy, G, TCU	Max Abmas, G, Texas
December 28, 2023	RaeQuan Battle, G, West Virginia	RaeQuan Battle, G, West Virginia
January 2, 2024	Pop Isaacs, G, Texas Tech; RaeQuan Battle (2), G, West Virginia	Keshon Gilbert, G, Iowa State
January 8, 2024	Hunter Dickinson (2), C, Kansas	Keshon Gilbert (2), G, Iowa State
January 15, 2024	Emanuel Miller (2), F, TCU	Max Abmas (2), G, Texas
January 22, 2024	Jamal Shead, G, Houston	Arthur Kaluma, F, Kansas State
January 29, 2024	Emanuel Miller (3), F, TCU	Chance McMillian (2), G, Texas Tech
February 5, 2024	Hunter Dickinson (3), C, Kansas	Max Abmas (3), G, Texas
February 12, 2024	Dylan Disu, F, Texas	Yves Missi, C, Baylor
February 19, 2024	Jayden Nunn, G, Baylor	Jayden Nunn, G, Baylor
February 26, 2024	Jamal Shead (2), G, Houston	Arthur Kaluma (2), F, Kansas State
March 4, 2024	Tylor Perry, G, Kansas State	Chendall Weaver, G, Texas
March 11, 2024	Tyrese Hunter, G, Texas; Darrion Williams, F, Texas Tech	Darrion Williams, F, Texas Tech

== Rankings ==
Legend
	Increase in ranking
	Decrease in ranking
	Not ranked previous week
т	Tied with another team in rankings

		Pre	Wk 1	Wk 2	Wk 3	Wk 4	Wk 5	Wk 6	Wk 7	Wk 8	Wk 9	Wk 10	Wk 11	Wk 12	Wk 13	Wk 14	Wk 15	Wk 16	Wk 17	Wk 18	Wk 19	Final
Baylor	AP	20	15	13	9	6	6	10	17	18	14	9	15	18	13	12	11	15	11	14	14	16
Baylor	C	17	13	12	9	6	6	10	19	18	14	9	14	18	13	13	11	14	11	13	13	14
BYU	AP		RV	RV	19	14	18	17	14	12	18	20	21	22	21	19	25	RV	20	20	21	RV
BYU	C		RV	RV	19	13т	17	15	12	12	17	19	19	21	19	17	21	RV	23	21	21	RV
Cincinnati	AP				RV	RV					RV											
Cincinnati	C				RV	RV	RV				RV											
Houston	AP	7	6	6	6	3	4	3	3	3	2	5	4	4	5	3	2	1	1	1	2	3т
Houston	C	6	6	6	5	2	3	3	3	3	2	5	4	4	5	3	2	1	1	1	2	3
Iowa State	AP		RV	RV	RV		RV	RV	RV	RV	RV	24	23	12	14	10	6	8	6	7	4	8
Iowa State	C	RV	RV	RV	RV	RV	RV	RV	RV	RV	RV	20	18	11	14	10	6	6	6	8	4	8
Kansas	AP	1	1	1	5	2	2	2	2	2	3	3	7	8	4	6	9	7	14	16	17	19
Kansas	C	1	1	1	6	3	2	2	2	2	3	4	8	9	4	7	10	9	15	17	20	21
Kansas State	AP	RV			RV		RV						RV									
Kansas State	C	RV		RV									RV									
Oklahoma	AP			RV	25	19	11	7	12	11	9	15	11	23	RV	25		RV				
Oklahoma	C				RV	22	12	8	13	11	9	16	13	24	RV	21	RV	RV	RV	RV		
Oklahoma State	AP																					
Oklahoma State	C																					
TCU	AP	RV	RV	RV	RV	RV	RV	RV			RV	19	RV	25	RV	RV	RV	RV				
TCU	C	RV	RV	RV	RV	RV	RV	RV	RV	RV	RV	22	RV	25	RV	RV	25	RV	RV			
Texas	AP	18	19	15	16	12	19	19	21	20	25	RV	RV	RV	RV	RV			RV	RV		RV
Texas	C	18	17	17	18	16	22	22	24	22	RV	RV	RV	RV	RV							RV
Texas Tech	AP										RV	25	20	15	23	RV	23	RV	RV	25	22	RV
Texas Tech	C										RV	25	21	15	23	RV	23	RV	RV	23	22	25
UCF	AP																					
UCF	C																					
West Virginia	AP																					
West Virginia	C																					

== Record vs Other Conferences ==
The Big 12 had a record of 49–7 in non-conference play.

Power 6 Conferences
Conference	Record
ACC	1–3
Big East	1–0
Big Ten	0–0
Pac–12	1–1
SEC	2–0
Combined	5–4

Other Conferences
Conference	Record
America East	0–0
American	1–0
ASUN	2–0
Atlantic 10	1–1
Big Sky	2–0
Big South	1–0
Big West	1–0
CAA	1–1
Conference USA	3–0
Horizon	3–0
Independents/Non-Division I	1–0
Ivy League	0–0
Metro Atlantic	1–0
Mid-American	1–0
Mid-Eastern Athletic	3–0
Missouri Valley	2–0
Mountain West	2–0
Northeast	0–0
Ohio Valley	1–0
Patriot	0–0
Southern	0–0
Southland	6–0
Southwestern Athletic	4–0
Summit	4–0
Sun Belt	2–0
West Coast	0–0
Western Athletic	1–1
Combined	44–3

== Postseason ==
=== Big 12 tournament ===
- March 12–16, T-Mobile Center, Kansas City, MO.

2024 Big 12 men's basketball tournament seeds and results
Seed	School	Conf.	Over.	Tiebreaker	First round March 12	Second round March 13	Quarterfinals March 14	Semifinals March 15	Championship March 16
1.	Houston#‡	15–3	28–3		Bye	Bye	W vs. TCU	W vs. Texas Tech	L vs. Iowa State
2.	Iowa State‡	13–5	24–7		Bye	Bye	W vs. Kansas State	W vs. Baylor	W vs. Houston
3.	Baylor‡	11–7	22–9	1–0 vs. Iowa State	Bye	Bye	W vs. Cincinnati	L vs. Iowa State	–
4.	Texas Tech‡	11–7	22–9	0–1 vs. Iowa State	Bye	Bye	W vs. BYU	L vs. Houston	–
5.	BYU†	10–8	22–9	1–0 vs. Kansas	Bye	W vs. UCF	L vs. Texas Tech	–	–
6.	Kansas†	10–8	22–9	0–1 vs. BYU	Bye	L vs. Cincinnati	–	–	–
7.	Texas†	9–9	20–11	1–0 vs. TCU	Bye	L vs. Kansas State	–	–	–
8.	TCU†	9–9	20–11	0–1 vs. Texas	Bye	W vs. Oklahoma	L vs. Houston	–	–
9.	Oklahoma†	8–10	20–11	1–0 vs. Kansas State	Bye	L vs. TCU	–	–	–
10.	Kansas State†	8–10	18–13	0–1 vs. Oklahoma	Bye	W vs. Texas	L vs. Iowa State	–	–
11.	Cincinnati	7–11	18–13	2–0 vs. UCF	W vs. West Virginia	W vs. Kansas	L vs. Baylor	–	–
12.	UCF	7–11	16–14	0–2 vs. Cincinnati	W vs. Oklahoma State	L vs. BYU	–	–	–
13.	Oklahoma State	4–14	12–19	1–0 vs. West Virginia	L vs. UCF	–	–	–	–
14.	West Virginia	4–14	9–22	0–1 vs. Oklahoma State	L vs. Cincinnati	–	–	–	–
# – Big 12 regular season champions, and tournament No. 1 seed. ‡ – Received a double-bye into the conference tournament quarterfinal round. † – Received a single-bye into the conference tournament second round. Overall records include all games played in the Big 12 tournament.

=== Bracket ===
First round Tuesday, March 12
12	UCF	77
13	Oklahoma State	62
11	Cincinnati	90
14	West Virginia	85

Second round Wednesday, March 13
8	TCU	77
9	Oklahoma	70
5	BYU	87
12	UCF	73
7	Texas	74
10	Kansas State	78
6	Kansas	52
11	Cincinnati	72

Quarterfinals; Thursday, March 14
1	Houston	60
8	TCU	45
4	Texas Tech	81
5	BYU	67
2	Iowa State	76
10	Kansas State	57
3	Baylor	68
11	Cincinnati	56

Semifinals; Friday, March 15
1	Houston	82
4	Texas Tech	59
2	Iowa State	76
3	Baylor	62

Championship; Saturday, March 16
1	Houston	41
2	Iowa State	69

* denotes overtime period

=== NCAA Tournament ===
Seed	Region	School	First round	Second round	Sweet 16	Elite Eight	Final Four	Championship
1	South	Houston	Defeated (16) Longwood, 86–46	Defeated (9) Texas A&M, 100–95 (OT)	Lost to (4) Duke, 51–54	DNP		
2	East	Iowa State	Defeated (15) South Dakota State, 82–65	Defeated (7) Washington State, 67–56	Lost to (3) Illinois, 69–72	DNP		
3	West	Baylor	Defeated (14) Colgate, 92–67	Lost to (6) Clemson, 64–72	DNP			
4	Midwest	Kansas	Defeated (13) Samford, 93–89	Lost to (5) Gonzaga, 68–89	DNP			
6	East	BYU	Lost to (11) Duquesne, 67–71	DNP				
6	South	Texas Tech	Lost to (11) NC State, 67–80	DNP				
7	Midwest	Texas	Defeated (10) Colorado State, 56–44	Lost to (2) Tennessee, 58–62	DNP			
9	Midwest	TCU	Lost to (8) Utah State, 72–88	DNP				
	Bids	W-L (%):	5–3 (.625)	2–3 (.400)	0–2 (.000)	0–0 (–)	0–0 (–)	TOTAL: 7–8 (.467)

=== NIT ===
Seed	School	First round	Second round	Quarterfinals	Semifinals	Final
2	Cincinnati	Defeated San Francisco, 73–72 (OT)	Defeated (3) Bradley, 74–57	Lost to (1) Indiana State, 81–85	DNP	
4	UCF	Lost to South Florida, 77–83	DNP			
–	Kansas State	Lost to (3) Iowa, 82–91	DNP			
	W-L (%):	1–2 (.333)	1–0 (1.000)	0–1 (–)	0–0 (–)	TOTAL: 2–3 (.400)

== Honors and awards ==
=== All-Big 12 awards and teams ===
2024 Big 12 Men's Basketball Individual Awards
Award	Recipient(s)
Player of the Year	Jamal Shead, Houston
Coach of the Year	Kelvin Sampson, Houston
Defensive Player of the Year	Jamal Shead, Houston
Sixth Man Award	Jaxson Robinson, BYU
Newcomer of the Year	Hunter Dickinson, Kansas
Freshman of the Year	Ja'Kobe Walter, Baylor
Most Improved Player	Dylan Disu, Texas

2024 Big 12 Men's Basketball All-Conference Teams
First Team	Second Team	Third Team	Defensive Team	Newcomer Team	Freshman Team
Jamal Shead, UH; Tamin Lipsey, ISU; Hunter Dickinson, KU; Kevin McCullar Jr., KU; Dylan Disu, UT	RayJ Dennis, BU; LJ Cryer, UH; Keshon Gilbert, ISU; Emanuel Miller, TCU; Max Abmas, UT	Jalen Bridges, BU; Ja'Kobe Walter, BU; J'Wan Roberts, UH; Pop Isaacs, TTU; Darrion Williams, TTU	Yves Missi, BU; John Newman III, UC; Jamal Shead, UH; Tamin Lipsey, ISU; Dajuan Harris Jr., KU	RayJ Dennis, BU; Keshon Gilbert, ISU; Hunter Dickinson, KU; Max Abmas, UT; Darrion Williams, TTU	Yves Missi, BU; Ja'Kobe Walter, BU; Joseph Tugler, UH; Milan Momcilovic, ISU; Johnny Furphy, KU
† - denotes unanimous selection

Honorable Mention: Langston Love (Baylor), Yves Missi (Baylor), Dallin Hall (BYU), Spencer Johnson (BYU), Jaxson Robinson (BYU), Fousseyni Traore (BYU), Ibrahima Diallo (UCF), Darius Johnson (UCF), Jaylin Sellers (UCF), Aziz Bandaogo (Cincinnati), Dan Skillings Jr. (Cincinnati), Ja'Vier Francis (Houston), Emanuel Sharp (Houston), KJ Adams Jr. (Kansas), Johnny Furphy (Kansas), Dajuan Harris Jr. (Kansas), Arthur Kaluma (K-State), Tylor Perry (K-State), Javian McCollum (Oklahoma), Jalon Moore (Oklahoma), Javon Small (Oklahoma State), Jameer Nelson Jr. (TCU), Micah Peavy (TCU), Joe Toussaint (Texas Tech)
