= 2023–24 Texas Tech Red Raiders basketball team =

American college basketball season

2023–24 Texas Tech Red Raiders basketball

NCAA tournament, First Round
- Conference: Big 12 Conference

Ranking
- Coaches: No. 25
- Record: 23–11 (11–7 Big 12)
- Head coach: Grant McCasland (1st season)
- Assistant coaches: Matt Braeuer (1st season); Achoki Moikobu (1st season); Luke Barnwell (1st season); Dave Smart (1st season)
- Home arena: United Supermarkets Arena

2023–24 Big 12 men's basketball standings
	Conf.				Overall
Team	W		L	PCT	W		L	PCT
No. 3т Houston	15	–	3	.833	32	–	5	.865
No. 8 Iowa State †	13	–	5	.722	29	–	8	.784
No. 16 Baylor	11	–	7	.611	24	–	11	.686
Texas Tech	11	–	7	.611	23	–	11	.676
BYU	10	–	8	.556	23	–	11	.676
No. 19 Kansas	10	–	8	.556	23	–	11	.676
Texas	9	–	9	.500	21	–	13	.618
TCU	9	–	9	.500	21	–	13	.618
Oklahoma	8	–	10	.444	20	–	12	.625
Kansas State	8	–	10	.444	19	–	15	.559
Cincinnati	7	–	11	.389	22	–	15	.595
UCF	7	–	11	.389	17	–	16	.515
Oklahoma State	4	–	14	.222	12	–	20	.375
West Virginia	4	–	14	.222	9	–	23	.281
† 2024 Big 12 tournament winner Rankings from AP poll

The 2023–24 Texas Tech Red Raiders basketball team represented Texas Tech University in the 2023–24 NCAA Division I men's basketball season as a member of the Big 12 Conference. The Red Raiders were led by first-year coach Grant McCasland. They played their home games at the United Supermarkets Arena in Lubbock, Texas. The Texas Tech Red Raiders men's basketball team drew an average home attendance of 12,926 in 17 games in 2023-24.

== Previous season ==
The Red Raiders finished the 2022–23 season 16–16, 5–13 in Big 12 play to finish in a tie for last place. As the No. 9 seed the Big 12 tournament, they lost to West Virginia in the first round.

The day after the Red Raiders' final regular season game, Mark Adams was suspended for what the school called an "inappropriate, unacceptable, and racially insensitive comment" that he had made the previous week. On March 8, 2023, Adams resigned. On March 31, the school named North Texas head coach Grant McCasland the team's new head coach.

== Offseason ==
Departures
Name	Number	Pos.	Height	Weight	Year	Hometown	Reason for departure
Kevin Obanor	0	F	6'8"	235	(redshirt) Senior	Houston, TX	Graduated/undrafted in 2023 NBA draft; signed with the Toronto Raptors
K. J. Allen	5	F	6'6"	255	Sophomore	Los Angeles, CA	Transferred to Portland State
Fardaws Aimaq	11	F	6'11"	245	(redshirt) Junior	Vancouver, BC	Transferred to California
Daniel Batcho	12	F	6'11"	235	(redshirt) Freshman	Paris, France	Transferred to Louisiana Tech
CJ Williams	13	G	6'1"	155	Freshman	Fayetteville, AR	Walk-on; transferred to Auburn
Jaylon Tyson	20	G	6'6"	210	(redshirt) Freshman	Plano, TX	Transferred to California
Elijah Fisher	22	G	6'6"	190	Freshman	Oshawa, ON	Transferred to DePaul
De'Vion Harmon	23	G	6'2"	205	Senior	Denton, TX	Graduated

Incoming transfers
Name	Number	Pos.	Height	Weight	Year	Hometown	Previous school
Chance McMillian	0	G	6'3"	185	Junior	Vallejo, CA	Grand Canyon
Darrion Williams	5	F	6'6"	210	Sophomore	Las Vegas, NV	Nevada
Joe Toussaint	6	G	6'0"	190	GS Senior	The Bronx, NY	West Virginia
KyeRon Lindsay	21	F	6'7"	205	Sophomore	Denton, TX	Georgia
Warren Washington	22	C	7'0"	225	GS Senior	Escondido, CA	Arizona State
Devan Cambridge	35	G/F	6'6"	215	GS Senior	Nashville, TN	Arizona State

=== Recruiting classes ===
==== 2023 recruiting class ====
College recruiting
Name	Hometown	School	Height	Weight	Commit date
Drew Steffe #27 SG	Frisco, TX	Memorial High School	6 ft 4 in (1.93 m)	180 lb (82 kg)	Jan 26, 2022
Drew Steffe #27 SG	Recruit ratings: Rivals: 247Sports: ESPN: (81)				
Eemeli Yalah; SF	Hudson, OH	Western Reserve Academy	6 ft 8 in (2.03 m)	230 lb (100 kg)	May 19, 2023
Eemeli Yalah; SF	Recruit ratings: Rivals: 247Sports: ESPN: (NR)				
Overall recruit ranking:
Note: In many cases, Scout, Rivals, 247Sports, On3, and ESPN may conflict in their listings of height and weight.; In these cases, the average was taken. ESPN grades are on a 100-point scale.; Sources: "2023 Team Ranking". Rivals.

== Roster ==
2023–24 Texas Tech Red Raiders men's basketball team
Players
Coaches

Pos.	#	Name	Height	Weight	Year	Previous school	Hometown
G	0	Chance McMillian	6 ft 3 in (1.91 m)	185 lb (84 kg)	Jr	Grand Canyon	Vallejo, CA
G	1	Lamar Washington	6 ft 4 in (1.93 m)	205 lb (93 kg)	So	Compass Prep	Chandler, AZ
G	2	Richard Pop Isaacs	6 ft 2 in (1.88 m)	170 lb (77 kg)	So	Las Vegas Coronado	Las Vegas, NV
G	3	D'Maurian Williams	6 ft 3 in (1.91 m)	200 lb (91 kg)	Sr	Gardner-Webb	Phoenix, AZ
F	5	Darrion Williams	6 ft 6 in (1.98 m)	210 lb (95 kg)	So	Nevada	Las Vegas, NV
G	6	Joe Toussaint	6 ft 0 in (1.83 m)	190 lb (86 kg)	GS	West Virginia	The Bronx, NY
G	10	Jack Francis (W)	6 ft 3 in (1.91 m)	190 lb (86 kg)	So	Anderson HS	Austin, TX
F	11	Drew Steffe	6 ft 5 in (1.96 m)	180 lb (82 kg)	Fr	Memorial HS	Frisco, TX
G	21	KyeRon Lindsay	6 ft 8 in (2.03 m)	205 lb (93 kg)	So	Georgia	Denton, TX
F	22	Warren Washington	7 ft 0 in (2.13 m)	225 lb (102 kg)	GS	Arizona State	Escondido, CA
F	23	Eemeli Yalaho	6 ft 8 in (2.03 m)	210 lb (95 kg)	Fr	Western Reserve Academy	Jyväskylä, Finland
G	24	Kerwin Walton	6 ft 5 in (1.96 m)	200 lb (91 kg)	Sr	North Carolina	Hopkins, MN
F	25	Robert Jennings	6 ft 7 in (2.01 m)	225 lb (102 kg)	So	Texas Alliance of Christian Athletes	DeSoto, TX
G	35	Devan Cambridge	6 ft 6 in (1.98 m)	215 lb (98 kg)	GS	Arizona State	Nashville, TN

Head coach

- Grant McCasland (Baylor)

Assistant coach(es)

- Matt Braeuer (Wichita State)
- Achoki Moikobu (Fort Hays State)
- Luke Barnwell (Newman)
- Dave Smart (Queens (ON))

Legend

- (C) Team captain
- (S) Suspended
- (I) Ineligible
- (W) Walk-on
- Injured
- Current redshirt

Roster
Last update: April 3, 2024

== Schedule and results ==
Date time, TV	Rank^{#}	Opponent^{#}	Result	Record	High points	High rebounds	High assists	Site (attendance) city, state
Exhibition
October 29, 2023*; 4:30 p.m., –		vs. No. 15 Texas A&M; Compete 4 Cause Classic	W 89–84	—	30 – Isaacs	6 – Cambridge	7 – Toussaint	The Super Pit (5,024); Denton, TX
Non-conference regular season
November 8, 2023*; 7:00 p.m., ESPN+		Texas A&M–Commerce	W 73–46	1–0	19 – Isaacs	12 – W. Washington	4 – L. Washington	United Supermarkets Arena (12,930); Lubbock, TX
November 12, 2023*; 1:00 p.m., ESPN+		San Jose State	W 56–42	2–0	15 – Cambridge	7 – Isaacs	5 – Isaacs	United Supermarkets Arena (10,443); Lubbock, TX
November 16, 2023*; 7:00 p.m., ESPN+		Texas A&M–Corpus Christi	W 73–64	3–0	17 – McMillian	14 – Da. Williams	4 – Isaacs	United Supermarkets Arena (11,336); Lubbock, TX
November 22, 2023*; 1:30 p.m., ESPN		vs. Villanova; Battle 4 Atlantis quarterfinals	L 69–85	3–1	16 – Isaacs	8 – W. Washington	8 – Toussaint	Imperial Arena (612); Nassau, Bahamas
November 23, 2023*; 11:00 a.m., ESPN2		vs. Northern Iowa; Battle 4 Atlantis consolation	W 72–70	4–1	21 – Toussaint	9 – Da. Williams	2 – tied	Imperial Arena (400); Nassau, Bahamas
November 24, 2023*; 5:30 p.m., ESPNU		vs. Michigan; Battle 4 Atlantis 5th-place game	W 73–57	5–1	17 – tied	10 – Da. Williams	4 – Toussaint	Imperial Arena (802); Nassau, Bahamas
November 30, 2023*; 5:30 p.m., FS1		at Butler; Big East–Big 12 Battle	L 95–103 ^{OT}	5–2	24 – McMillian	7 – McMillian	12 – Toussaint	Hinkle Fieldhouse (7,893); Indianapolis, IN
December 6, 2023*; 7:00 p.m., ESPN+		Omaha	W 87–58	6–2	22 – Walton	12 – W. Washington	3 – Da. Williams	United Supermarkets Arena (10,640); Lubbock, TX
December 12, 2023*; 8:00 p.m., ESPN+		Oral Roberts	W 82–76	7–2	18 – W. Washington	12 – W. Washington	5 – Isaacs	United Supermarkets Arena (10,280); Lubbock, TX
December 16, 2023*; 6:30 p.m., ESPN+		vs. Vanderbilt; USLBM Coast-to-Coast Challenge	W 76–54	8–2	19 – Isaacs	7 – Toussaint	7 – Isaacs	Dickies Arena (7,219); Fort Worth, TX
December 21, 2023*; 1:00 p.m., ESPN+		UT Arlington	W 77–66	9–2	19 – Toussaint	10 – W. Washington	6 – Da. Williams	United Supermarkets Arena (8,940); Lubbock, TX
December 28, 2023*; 7:00 p.m., ESPN+		Sam Houston	W 96–60	10–2	28 – Isaacs	8 – W. Washington	6 – Da. Williams	United Supermarkets Arena (12,271); Lubbock, TX
January 1, 2024*; 1:00 p.m., ESPN+		North Alabama	W 85–57	11–2	21 – Isaacs	7 – Jennings	5 – W. Washington	United Supermarkets Arena (10,048); Lubbock, TX
Big 12 regular season
January 6, 2024; 7:00 p.m., ESPN2		at No. 20 Texas	W 78–67	12–2 (1–0)	21 – Isaacs	5 – McMillian	5 – Toussaint	Moody Center (10,641); Austin, TX
January 9, 2024; 7:00 p.m., ESPN+		Oklahoma State	W 90–73	13–2 (2–0)	24 – Isaacs	8 – Da. Williams	5 – W. Washington	United Supermarkets Arena (14,362); Lubbock, TX
January 13, 2024; 3:00 p.m., ESPN2		Kansas State	W 60–59	14–2 (3–0)	12 – Toussaint	8 – W. Washington	2 – tied	United Supermarkets Arena (14,856); Lubbock, TX
January 17, 2024; 8:00 p.m., ESPNU	No. 25	at No. 5 Houston	L 54–77	14–3 (3–1)	18 – Walton	9 – W. Washington	5 – Isaacs	Fertitta Center (7,586); Houston, TX
January 20, 2024; 5:00 p.m., ESPN2	No. 25	No. 20 BYU	W 85–78	15–3 (4–1)	32 – Isaacs	9 – W. Washington	5 – Toussaint	United Supermarkets Arena (15,098); Lubbock, TX
January 27, 2024; 1:00 p.m., ESPN+	No. 20	at No. 11 Oklahoma	W 85–84	16–3 (5–1)	27 – McMillian	11 – Da. Williams	6 – Toussaint	Lloyd Noble Center (10,890); Norman, OK
January 30, 2024; 6:00 p.m., ESPN2	No. 15	at No. 25 TCU	L 78–85	16–4 (5–2)	25 – Isaacs	6 – W. Washington	9 – tied	Schollmaier Arena (6,903); Fort Worth, Texas
February 3, 2024; 5:00 p.m., ESPN+	No. 15	Cincinnati	L 72–75	16–5 (5–3)	22 – Isaacs	3 – Da. Williams	4 – Toussaint	United Supermarkets Arena (15,098); Lubbock, TX
February 6, 2024; 8:00 p.m., ESPN	No. 23	at No. 13 Baylor	L 73–79	16–6 (5–4)	18 – Toussaint	4 – Jennings	6 – Toussaint	Foster Pavilion (7,500); Waco, TX
February 10, 2024; 3:00 p.m., ESPN+	No. 23	UCF	W 74–63	17–6 (6–4)	13 – Da. Williams	13 – Da. Williams	6 – Isaacs	United Supermarkets Arena (13,715); Lubbock, TX
February 12, 2024; 8:00 p.m., ESPN		No. 6 Kansas	W 79–50	18–6 (7–4)	30 – Da. Williams	11 – Da. Williams	5 – Isaacs	United Supermarkets Arena (15,098); Lubbock, TX
February 17, 2024; 11:00 a.m., ESPN+		at No. 10 Iowa State	L 74–82	18–7 (7–5)	16 – Toussaint	11 – Da. Williams	4 – Toussaint	Hilton Coliseum (14,267); Ames, IA
February 20, 2024; 8:00 p.m., ESPN2	No. 23	TCU	W 82–81	19–7 (8–5)	19 – Isaacs	7 – tied	7 – Toussaint	United Supermarkets Arena (15,098); Lubbock, TX
February 24, 2024; 3:00 p.m., ESPN+	No. 23	at UCF	L 61–75	19–8 (8–6)	19 – Da. Williams	11 – Da. Williams	3 – tied	Addition Financial Arena (8,711); Orlando, FL
February 27, 2024; 8:00 p.m., ESPN		Texas	L 69–81	19–9 (8–7)	17 – Isaacs	9 – McMillian	5 – Toussaint	United Supermarkets Arena (15,098); Lubbock, TX
March 2, 2024; 5:00 p.m., ESPN2		at West Virginia	W 81–70	20–9 (9–7)	21 – Toussaint	9 – Da. Williams	7 – Toussaint	WVU Coliseum (11,313); Morgantown, WV
March 5, 2024; 7:00 p.m., ESPN+		at Oklahoma State	W 75–58	21–9 (10–7)	19 – Isaacs	9 – Da. Williams	6 – Toussaint	Gallagher-Iba Arena (6,023); Stillwater, OK
March 9, 2024; 5:00 p.m., ESPN2		No. 11 Baylor	W 78–68	22–9 (11–7)	20 – Isaacs	11 – Da. Williams	4 – Toussaint	United Supermarkets Arena (14,432); Lubbock, TX
Big 12 tournament
March 14, 2024; 11:30 a.m., ESPN2	(4) No. 25	vs. (5) No. 20 BYU; Quarterfinals	W 81–67	23–9	22 – Isaacs	8 – McMillian	4 – Toussaint	T-Mobile Center (17,186); Kansas City, MO
March 15, 2024; 6:00 p.m., ESPN2	(4) No. 25	vs. (1) No. 1 Houston; Semifinals	L 59–82	23–10	15 – McMillian	5 – tied	3 – tied	T-Mobile Center (19,135); Kansas City, MO
NCAA tournament
March 21, 2024; 8:40 p.m., CBS	(6 S) No. 22	vs. (11 S) NC State; First Round	L 67–80	23–11	16 – Toussaint	8 – W. Washington	6 – Da. Williams	PPG Paints Arena (18,586); Pittsburgh, PA
*Non-conference game. ^{#}Rankings from AP poll. (#) Tournament seedings in parentheses. S=South. All times are in Central Time.

== Rankings ==
Ranking movements Legend: ██ Increase in ranking ██ Decrease in ranking — = Not ranked RV = Received votes
	Week																				
Poll	Pre	1	2	3	4	5	6	7	8	9	10	11	12	13	14	15	16	17	18	19	Final
AP	—	—	—	—	—	—	—	—	—	RV	25	20	15	23	RV	23	RV	RV	25	22	RV
Coaches	—	—	—	—	—	—	—	—	—	RV	25	21	15	23	RV	23	RV	RV	23	22	25
