= 2023–24 Kansas State Wildcats men's basketball team =

American college basketball season

2023–24 Kansas State Wildcats men's basketball

NIT, First Round
- Conference: Big 12 Conference
- Record: 19–15 (8–10 Big 12)
- Head coach: Jerome Tang (2nd season)
- Associate head coach: Ulric Maligi (2nd season)
- Assistant coaches: Jareem Dowling; Rodney Perry
- Home arena: Bramlage Coliseum

2023–24 Big 12 men's basketball standings
	Conf.				Overall
Team	W		L	PCT	W		L	PCT
No. 3т Houston	15	–	3	.833	32	–	5	.865
No. 8 Iowa State †	13	–	5	.722	29	–	8	.784
No. 16 Baylor	11	–	7	.611	24	–	11	.686
Texas Tech	11	–	7	.611	23	–	11	.676
BYU	10	–	8	.556	23	–	11	.676
No. 19 Kansas	10	–	8	.556	23	–	11	.676
Texas	9	–	9	.500	21	–	13	.618
TCU	9	–	9	.500	21	–	13	.618
Oklahoma	8	–	10	.444	20	–	12	.625
Kansas State	8	–	10	.444	19	–	15	.559
Cincinnati	7	–	11	.389	22	–	15	.595
UCF	7	–	11	.389	17	–	16	.515
Oklahoma State	4	–	14	.222	12	–	20	.375
West Virginia	4	–	14	.222	9	–	23	.281
† 2024 Big 12 tournament winner Rankings from AP poll

The 2023–24 Kansas State Wildcats men's basketball team represented Kansas State University in the 2023–24 NCAA Division I men's basketball season, their 121st basketball season. The Wildcats were led by second-year head coach Jerome Tang and played their home games in Bramlage Coliseum in Manhattan, Kansas as members of the Big 12 Conference.

== Previous season ==
The Wildcats finished the 2022–23 season 26–10, 11–7 in Big 12 play to finish in a tie for third place. They lost in the quarterfinals of the Big 12 tournament to TCU. They received an at-large bid to the NCAA tournament as the No. 3 seed in the East region. They defeated Montana State, Kentucky, and Michigan State to advance to the Elite Eight. There they lost to Florida Atlantic.

== Offseason ==
=== Departures ===
Name	Number	Pos.	Height	Weight	Year	Hometown	Reason for departure
Markquis Nowell	1	G	5'8"	160	Senior	Harlem, NY	Graduated/undrafted in 2023 NBA draft; signed with the Toronto Raptors
Tykei Greene	4	G	6'4"	205	RS Senior	Queens, NY	Graduated
Keyontae Johnson	11	F	6'6"	229	GS Senior	Norfolk, VA	Graduated/2023 NBA draft; selected by 50th overall by Oklahoma City Thunder
Anthony Thomas	12	G/F	6'7"	180	Sophomore	Silver Spring, MD	Transferred to Northwestern State
Desi Sills	13	G	6'3"	200	Senior	Jonesboro, AR	Graduated
Nate Awbrey	21	G	6'3"	190	Senior	Manhattan, KS	Walk-on; graduated
Abayomi Iyiola	23	F/C	6'10"	215	GS Senior	Atlanta, GA	Graduated
Ismael Massoud	25	F	6'9"	210	Junior	East Harlem, NY	Transferred to Georgetown
Peyton Ackerman	43	G	5'10"	150	Freshman	Oklahoma City, OK	Walk-on; transferred

=== Incoming transfers ===
Name	Number	Pos.	Height	Weight	Year	Hometown	Previous school
Tylor Perry	2	G	5'11"	182	GS Senior	Fort Coffee, OK	North Texas
Arthur Kaluma	24	F	6'8"	225	Junior	Glendale, AZ	Creighton

=== Recruiting classes ===
==== 2023 recruiting class ====
College recruiting information
Name	Hometown	School	Height	Weight	Commit date
Dai Dai Ames #16 PG	Chicago, IL	Kenwood Academy High School	6 ft 1 in (1.85 m)	170 lb (77 kg)	Jul 20, 2022
Dai Dai Ames #16 PG	Recruit ratings: Scout: Rivals: 247Sports: ESPN: (85)				
R.J. Jones #15 SG	Aubrey, TX	Wasatch Academy	6 ft 3 in (1.91 m)	180 lb (82 kg)	Sep 7, 2022
R.J. Jones #15 SG	Recruit ratings: Scout: Rivals: 247Sports: ESPN: (84)				
Macaleab Rich #15 SG	East Saint Louis, IL	East St. Louis High School	6 ft 7 in (2.01 m)	225 lb (102 kg)	Sep 26, 2022
Macaleab Rich #15 SG	Recruit ratings: Scout: Rivals: 247Sports: ESPN: (82)				
Overall recruit ranking: Scout: Not Ranked Top 20 Rivals: Not Ranked Top 25 ESPN: Not Ranked Top 25
Note: In many cases, Scout, Rivals, 247Sports, On3, and ESPN may conflict in their listings of height and weight.; In these cases, the average was taken. ESPN grades are on a 100-point scale.; Sources: "2023 Kansas State Basketball Commits". Rivals.; "2023 Kansas State Basketball Commits". Scout.; "2023 Kansas State Basketball Commits". ESPN.; "Scout.com Team Recruiting Rankings". Scout.; "2023 Team Ranking". Rivals.

== Roster ==
2023–24 Kansas State Wildcats men's basketball team
Players
Coaches

Pos.	#	Name	Height	Weight	Year	Previous school	Hometown
F	1	David N'Guessan	6 ft 9 in (2.06 m)	215 lb (98 kg)	Sr	Virginia Tech	De Lier, Netherlands
G	2	Tylor Perry	5 ft 11 in (1.8 m)	182 lb (83 kg)	GS	North Texas	Fort Coffee, OK
G	3	Dorian Finister	6 ft 5 in (1.96 m)	190 lb (86 kg)	So	Carver	New Orleans, Louisiana
G	4	Dai Dai Ames	6 ft 1 in (1.85 m)	160 lb (73 kg)	Fr	Kenwood Academy	Chicago, Illinois
G	5	Cam Carter	6 ft 3 in (1.91 m)	190 lb (86 kg)	Jr	Mississippi State	Donaldsonville, Louisiana
G	8	R.J. Jones	6 ft 3 in (1.91 m)	175 lb (79 kg)	Fr	Wasatch Academy	Denton, Texas
C	13	Will McNair Jr	6 ft 11 in (2.11 m)	265 lb (120 kg)	Sr	Penn Academy	Philadelphia, Pennsylvania
F	15	Taj Manning	6 ft 8 in (2.03 m)	220 lb (100 kg)	RS Fr	La Lumiere School	Grandview, Missouri
C	20	Jerrell Colbert	6 ft 10 in (2.08 m)	235 lb (107 kg)	RS So	LSU	Houston, Texas
F	23	Macaleab Rich	6 ft 8 in (2.03 m)	250 lb (113 kg)	Fr	East St. Louis	East St. Louis, Illinois
F	24	Arthur Kaluma	6 ft 8 in (2.03 m)	225 lb (102 kg)	Jr	Creighton	Glendale, Arizona
F/C	35	Nae'Qwan Tomlin	6 ft 10 in (2.08 m)	210 lb (95 kg)	Sr	Chipola College	Harlem, New York

Head coach

- Jerome Tang (Charter Oak)

Assistant coach(es)

- Ulric Maligi (Howard)
- Jareem Dowling (Maryland Eastern Shore)
- Rodney Perry (Dallas Christian)

Legend

- (C) Team captain
- (S) Suspended
- (I) Ineligible
- (W) Walk-on
- Injured
- Current redshirt

Roster

== Schedule and results ==
Date time, TV	Rank^{#}	Opponent^{#}	Result	Record	High points	High rebounds	High assists	Site (attendance) city, state
Exhibition
August 9, 2023*; 7:00 p.m.		Israel select	W 94–87	–	23 – Kaluma	10 – Carter	7 – Perry	Hadar Yosef Arena; Tel Aviv, ISR
August 17, 2023*; 7:00 p.m.		Mexico	L 81–83	–	18 – Perry	7 – Tied	3 – Tied	Etihad Arena; Abu Dhabi, UAE
August 18, 2023*; 1:00 p.m.		Sharjah SC	W 112–72	–	33 – Perry	11 – Colbert	4 – Carter	Al Jazira Club Gym (128); Abu Dhabi, UAE
November 1, 2023*; 7:00 p.m.		Emporia State	W 102–68	–	20 – Carter	9 – Rich	5 – Perry	Bramlage Coliseum (9,268); Manhattan, KS
Non-conference regular season
November 6, 2023*; 9:00 p.m., TNT		vs. No. 21 USC; Hall of Fame Series	L 69–82	0–1	22 – Perry	10 – N'Guessan	6 – Perry	T-Mobile Arena (7,595); Paradise, NV
November 10, 2023*; 7:00 p.m., ESPN+		Bellarmine	W 83–75	1–1	18 – Perry	9 – N’Guessan	6 – Ames	Bramlage Coliseum (9,947); Manhattan, KS
November 13, 2023*; 7:00 p.m., ESPN+		South Dakota State	W 91–68	2–1	25 – Carter	11 – N’Guessan	7 – Ames	Bramlage Coliseum (9,421); Manhattan, KS
November 17, 2023*; 5:00 p.m., CBSSN		vs. Providence; Baha Mar Hoops Bahamas Championship semifinals	W 73–70 ^{OT}	3–1	24 – Perry	8 – Carter	4 – Ames	Baha Mar Convention Center (1,833); Nassau, Bahamas
November 19, 2023*; 1:30 p.m., CBSSN		vs. No. 12 Miami (FL); Baha Mar Hoops Bahamas Championship final	L 83–91	3–2	28 – Carter	12 – Kaluma	5 – Perry	Baha Mar Convention Center (1,895); Nassau, Bahamas
November 22, 2023*; 7:00 p.m., ESPN+		Central Arkansas	W 100–56	4–2	20 – Kaluma	11 – N’Guessan	6 – Perry	Bramlage Coliseum (8,980); Manhattan, KS
November 28, 2023*; 7:00 p.m., ESPN+		Oral Roberts	W 88–78 ^{OT}	5–2	20 – Tied	10 – Carter	7 – Perry	Bramlage Coliseum (9,887); Manhattan, KS
December 2, 2023*; 1:00 p.m., ESPN+		North Alabama	W 75–74 ^{OT}	6–2	16 – Perry	8 – Tied	6 – Perry	Bramlage Coliseum (9,528); Manhattan, KS
December 5, 2023*; 6:00 p.m., ESPN2		Villanova; Big East-Big 12 Battle	W 72–71 ^{OT}	7–2	26 – Kaluma	10 – N’Guessan	6 – Perry	Bramlage Coliseum (10,140); Manhattan, KS
December 9, 2023*; 12:30 p.m., SECN		at LSU	W 75–60	8–2	21 – Carter	11 – Kaluma	6 – Perry	Pete Maravich Assembly Center (7,413); Baton Rouge, LA
December 17, 2023*; 2:00 p.m., ESPN+		Nebraska	L 46–62	8–3	12 – Carter	9 – Rich	6 – Perry	Bramlage Coliseum (10,206); Manhattan, KS
December 21, 2023*; 7:30 p.m., ESPN+		vs. Wichita State; Wildcat Classic	W 69–60	9–3	17 – Perry	9 – N'Guessan	5 – Tied	T-Mobile Center (18,660); Kansas City, MO
January 2, 2024*; 7:00 p.m., ESPN+		Chicago State	W 62–55	10–3	19 – Carter	13 – Kaluma	4 – Perry	Bramlage Coliseum (9,123); Manhattan, KS
Big 12 regular season
January 6, 2024; 5:00 p.m., ESPN2		UCF	W 77–52	11–3 (1–0)	25 – Perry	14 – N’Guessan	6 – Carter	Bramlage Coliseum (9,698); Manhattan, KS
January 9, 2024; 6:00 p.m., ESPN+		at West Virginia	W 81–67	12–3 (2–0)	23 – Carter	9 – McNair	5 – Perry	WVU Coliseum (10,063); Morgantown, WV
January 13, 2024; 3:00 p.m., ESPN2		at Texas Tech	L 59–60	12–4 (2–1)	16 – Perry	9 – McNair	4 – Perry	United Supermarkets Arena (14,856); Lubbock, TX
January 16, 2024; 7:00 p.m., ESPN+		No. 9 Baylor	W 68–64 ^{OT}	13–4 (3–1)	18 – Tied	10 – Kaluma	4 – Perry	Bramlage Coliseum (10,055); Manhattan, KS
January 20, 2024; 6:00 p.m., ESPN+		Oklahoma State	W 70–66	14–4 (4–1)	23 – Kaluma	7 – Kaluma	5 – Perry	Bramlage Coliseum (10,247); Manhattan, KS
January 24, 2024; 8:00 p.m., ESPN2		at No. 23 Iowa State	L 67–78	14–5 (4–2)	16 – Kaluma	6 – Finister	5 – Perry	Hilton Coliseum (14,267); Ames, IA
January 27, 2024; 11:00 a.m., ESPN		at No. 4 Houston	L 52–74	14–6 (4–3)	16 – Carter	9 – McNair	3 – McNair	Fertitta Center (7,260); Houston, TX
January 30, 2024; 7:00 p.m., ESPN+		No. 23 Oklahoma	L 53–73	14–7 (4–4)	23 – Perry	6 – Tied	2 – Tied	Bramlage Coliseum (9,955); Manhattan, KS
February 3, 2024; 1:00 p.m., ESPN+		at Oklahoma State	L 72–75	14–8 (4–5)	19 – Perry	9 – McNair	5 – Carter	Gallagher-Iba Arena (7,623); Stillwater, OK
February 5, 2024; 8:00 p.m., ESPN		No. 4 Kansas; Sunflower Showdown	W 75–70 ^{OT}	15–8 (5–5)	26 – Perry	11 – Carter	4 – Perry	Bramlage Coliseum (11,010); Manhattan, KS
February 10, 2024; 9:00 p.m., ESPN2		at No. 21 BYU	L 66–72	15–9 (5–6)	18 – Kaluma	10 – McNair Jr.	3 – Perry	Marriott Center (17,446); Provo, UT
February 17, 2024; 11:00 a.m., ESPNU		TCU	L 72–75	15–10 (5–7)	24 – Perry	6 – Carter	3 – Tied	Bramlage Coliseum (9,609); Manhattan, KS
February 19, 2024; 8:00 p.m., ESPN2		at Texas	L 56–62	15–11 (5–8)	17 – Kaluma	7 – Kaluma	4 – Perry	Moody Center (10,905); Austin, TX
February 24, 2024; 1:00 p.m., ESPN+		No. 25 BYU	W 84–74	16–11 (6–8)	28 – Kaluma	10 – Kaluma	5 – Perry	Bramlage Coliseum (9,117); Manhattan, KS
February 26, 2024; 6:00 p.m., ESPN2		West Virginia	W 94–90 ^{OT}	17–11 (7–8)	29 – Perry	10 – N'Guessan	6 – Perry	Bramlage Coliseum (8,813); Manhattan, KS
March 2, 2024; 6:00 p.m., ESPN+		at Cincinnati	L 72–74	17–12 (7–9)	26 – Perry	7 – Tied	3 – Tied	Fifth Third Arena (11,974); Cincinnati, OH
March 5, 2024; 6:00 p.m., ESPN		at No. 14 Kansas; Sunflower Showdown	L 68–90	17–13 (7–10)	17 – McNair Jr.	10 – McNair Jr.	3 – Ames	Allen Fieldhouse (16,300); Lawrence, KS
March 9, 2024; 1:00 p.m., ESPN2		No. 6 Iowa State	W 65–58	18–13 (8–10)	23 – Kaluma	16 – N'Guessan	5 – Perry	Bramlage Coliseum (9,311); Manhattan, KS
Big 12 tournament
March 13, 2024; 6:00 p.m., ESPN+	(10)	vs. (7) Texas; Second Round	W 78–74	19–13	21 – Perry	8 – Kaluma	3 – Ames	T-Mobile Center; Kansas City, MO
March 14, 2024; 6:00 p.m., ESPN2	(10)	vs. (2) No. 7 Iowa State; Quarterfinals	L 57–76	19–14	18 – Perry	6 – McNair Jr.	2 – Tied	T-Mobile Center; Kansas City, MO
NIT
March 19, 2024; 8:00 p.m., ESPN		at (3) Iowa; First Round - Villanova Bracket	L 82–91	19–15	16 – Ames	7 – Tied	5 – Ames	Carver–Hawkeye Arena (4,532); Iowa City, IA
*Non-conference game. ^{#}Rankings from AP Poll. (#) Tournament seedings in parentheses. All times are in Central Time.

== Rankings ==
Ranking movements Legend: ██ Increase in ranking ██ Decrease in ranking — = Not ranked RV = Received votes
	Week																			
Poll	Pre	1	2	3	4	5	6	7	8	9	10	11	12	13	14	15	16	17	18	Final
AP	RV	—	—	—	—	—	—	—	—	—	—	—	RV	—	—	—	—	—		Not released
Coaches	RV	—	—	—	—	—	—	—	—	—	—	—	RV							

*AP does not release post-NCAA Tournament rankings.
