= 2023–24 UCF Knights men's basketball team =

American college basketball season

2023–24 UCF Knights men's basketball

Jacksonville Classic Coast champions

NIT, First Round
- Conference: Big 12 Conference
- Record: 17–16 (7–11 Big 12)
- Head coach: Johnny Dawkins (8th season)
- Assistant coaches: Kevin Norris (8th season); Robbie Laing (8th season); Mamadou N'Diaye (3rd season); Tyson Waterman (1st season); Ben Witherspoon (1st season)
- Home arena: Addition Financial Arena

2023–24 Big 12 men's basketball standings
	Conf.				Overall
Team	W		L	PCT	W		L	PCT
No. 3т Houston	15	–	3	.833	32	–	5	.865
No. 8 Iowa State †	13	–	5	.722	29	–	8	.784
No. 16 Baylor	11	–	7	.611	24	–	11	.686
Texas Tech	11	–	7	.611	23	–	11	.676
BYU	10	–	8	.556	23	–	11	.676
No. 19 Kansas	10	–	8	.556	23	–	11	.676
Texas	9	–	9	.500	21	–	13	.618
TCU	9	–	9	.500	21	–	13	.618
Oklahoma	8	–	10	.444	20	–	12	.625
Kansas State	8	–	10	.444	19	–	15	.559
Cincinnati	7	–	11	.389	22	–	15	.595
UCF	7	–	11	.389	17	–	16	.515
Oklahoma State	4	–	14	.222	12	–	20	.375
West Virginia	4	–	14	.222	9	–	23	.281
† 2024 Big 12 tournament winner Rankings from AP poll

The 2023–24 UCF Knights men's basketball team represented the University of Central Florida during the 2023–24 NCAA Division I men's basketball season, marking their first season as members of the Big 12 Conference. The Knights, in the program's 55th season of basketball, were led by eighth-year head coach Johnny Dawkins and played their home games at the Addition Financial Arena.

== Previous season ==
The Knights finished the 2022–23 season 18–14, 8–10 in AAC Play to finish in 7th place. They defeated SMU in the first round of the AAC Tournament before losing in the quarterfinals to Memphis. The Knights received an at-large bid to the NIT, where they defeated Florida in the first round before losing in the second round to Oregon.

This was also the last season UCF played in the American Athletic Conference before moving to the Big 12 Conference.

== Offseason ==
=== Departures ===
Name	Number	Pos.	Height	Weight	Year	Hometown	Reason for departure
Lahat Thioune	0	C	6'10"	225	RS senior	Dakar, Senegal	Graduate transferred to South Dakota
Jayhlon Young	1	G	6'2"	175	RS sophomore	Dallas, TX	Transferred to Memphis
Michael Durr	2	F	7'0"	250	RS senior	Atlanta, GA	Graduated
Brandon Suggs	4	G/F	6'6"	185	Senior	Powder Springs, GA	Graduate transferred to New Mexico State
P. J. Edwards	5	G	6'4"	200	Sophomore	Springfield, IL	Transferred to Bowling Green
Tyem Freeman	11	G	6'6"	210	RS junior	Springfield, MO	Transferred to Kent State
Ithiel Horton	12	G	6'3"	200	RS senior	Vauxhall, NJ	Graduated
Taylor Hendricks	25	F	6'9"	210	Freshman	Fort Lauderdale, FL	Declare for 2023 NBA draft

=== Incoming transfers ===
Name	Num	Pos.	Height	Weight	Year	Hometown	Previous school
Antwann Jones	1	G	6'6"	220	RS senior	Orlando, FL	Louisiana
Shemarri Allen	2	G	6'4"	200	GS senior	Arden, NC	Kansas City
Omar Payne	5	F	6'10"	240	RS senior	Kissimmee, FL	Jacksonville
Ibrahima Diallo	11	C	7'0"	220	RS senior	Saly, Senegal	San Jose State
Jaylin Sellers	24	G	6'4"	180	Junior	Columbus, GA	Ball State

=== 2023 recruiting class ===
College recruiting
Name	Hometown	School	Height	Weight	Commit date
Comeh Emuobor #80 SF	Raleigh, NC	Brewster Academy	6 ft 9 in (2.06 m)	210 lb (95 kg)	Sep 29, 2022
Comeh Emuobor #80 SF	Recruit ratings: Scout: Rivals: 247Sports: ESPN: (78)				
Overall recruit ranking:
Note: In many cases, Scout, Rivals, 247Sports, On3, and ESPN may conflict in their listings of height and weight.; In these cases, the average was taken. ESPN grades are on a 100-point scale.; Sources: "2023 Team Ranking". Rivals.

== Roster ==
2023–24 UCF Knights men's basketball team
Players
Coaches

Pos.	#	Name	Height	Weight	Year	Previous school	Hometown
G	0	Charlie May (W)	6 ft 5 in (1.96 m)	190 lb (86 kg)	RS Fr	St. Andrew's School	Boca Raton, Florida
G	1	Antwann Jones	6 ft 6 in (1.98 m)	220 lb (100 kg)	RS Sr	Creighton	Orlando, Florida
G	2	Shemarri Allen	6 ft 4 in (1.93 m)	200 lb (91 kg)	GS	Kansas City	Arden, North Carolina
G	3	Darius Johnson	6 ft 1 in (1.85 m)	190 lb (86 kg)	Jr	Episcopal High School	Boyds, Maryland
G	4	Comeh Emuobor	6 ft 5 in (1.96 m)	190 lb (86 kg)	Fr	Brewster Academy	Raleigh, North Carolina
F	5	Omar Payne	6 ft 10 in (2.08 m)	240 lb (109 kg)	RS Sr	Jacksonville	Kissimmee, Florida
C	11	Ibrahima Diallo	7 ft 0 in (2.13 m)	220 lb (100 kg)	RS Sr	San Jose State	Saly, Senegal
G	14	Michael Kalina (W)	6 ft 1 in (1.85 m)	185 lb (84 kg)	RS Fr	North Broward Prep School	Boca Raton, Florida
G	15	Tyler Hendricks	6 ft 5 in (1.96 m)	175 lb (79 kg)	RS Fr	Calvary Christian Academy	Fort Lauderdale, Florida
G	20	Poohpha Warakulnukroh (W)	5 ft 11 in (1.8 m)	180 lb (82 kg)	RS So	Montverde Academy	Bangkok, Thailand
F	21	C. J. Walker	6 ft 8 in (2.03 m)	205 lb (93 kg)	GS	Oregon	Sanford, Florida
G	22	Nils Machowski	6 ft 2 in (1.88 m)	180 lb (82 kg)	Fr		Berlin, Germany
G	24	Jaylin Sellers	6 ft 4 in (1.93 m)	180 lb (82 kg)	Jr	Ball State	Columbus, Georgia
F	31	Thierno Sylla	6 ft 11 in (2.11 m)	225 lb (102 kg)	So	Royal Crown Academic School	Conakry, Guinea

Head coach

- Johnny Dawkins (Duke)

Assistant coach(es)

- Kevin Norris (Miami (FL))
- Robbie Laing (Troy)
- Mamadou N'Diaye (Auburn)

Legend

- (C) Team captain
- (S) Suspended
- (I) Ineligible
- (W) Walk-on
- Injured
- Current redshirt

Roster

== Schedule and results ==
Date time, TV	Rank^{#}	Opponent^{#}	Result	Record	High points	High rebounds	High assists	Site (attendance) city, state
Non-conference regular season
November 6, 2023*; 8:00 p.m., ESPN+		FIU	W 85–62	1–0	23 – Sellers	6 – Tied	5 – Allen	Addition Financial Arena (6,225); Orlando, FL
November 10, 2023*; 7:00 p.m., ACCNX/ESPN+		at No. 13 Miami (FL)	L 72–88	1–1	22 – Sellers	11 – Sellers	1 – Tied	Watsco Center (7,972); Coral Gables, FL
November 16, 2023*; 7:00 p.m., ESPN+		Cal State Fullerton; Jacksonville Classic campus game	W 72–44	2–1	15 – Sellers	8 – Diallo	5 – Sellers	Addition Financial Arena (5,322); Orlando, FL
November 19, 2023*; 8:00 p.m.		vs. South Dakota State; Jacksonville Classic Coast semifinals	W 83–80	3–1	22 – Avery	5 – Tied	4 – Johnson	Flagler Gymnasium (609); St. Augustine, FL
November 20, 2023*; 8:30 p.m.		vs. Charlotte; Jacksonville Classic Coast championship	W 74–71 ^{OT}	4–1	25 – Johnson	14 – Diallo	4 – Johnson	Flagler Gymnasium (329); St. Augustine, FL
November 26, 2023*; 4:00 p.m., ESPN+		Stetson	L 82–85	4–2	34 – Sellers	8 – Sellers	7 – Johnson	Addition Financial Arena (5,089); Orlando, FL
December 2, 2023*; 4:00 p.m., ESPN+		Lipscomb	W 72–57	5–2	19 – Johnson	9 – Diallo	3 – Johnson	Addition Financial Arena (5,152); Orlando, FL
December 6, 2023*; 7:00 p.m., ESPN+		Jacksonville	W 94–52	6–2	20 – Sylla	11 – Sylla	3 – Tied	Addition Financial Arena (5,278); Orlando, FL
December 10, 2023*; 4:00 p.m., ESPN+		Ole Miss	L 68–70	6–3	25 – Johnson	10 – Payne	3 – Tied	Addition Financial Arena (6,067); Orlando, FL
December 18, 2023*; 7:00 p.m., ESPN+		Maine	W 74–51	7–3	16 – Johnson	9 – Allen	5 – Allen	Addition Financial Arena (5,014); Orlando, FL
December 21, 2023*; 7:00 p.m., ESPN+		Florida A&M	W 69–56	8–3	15 – Sellers	12 – Diallo	5 – Johnson	Addition Financial Arena (5,066); Orlando, FL
December 29, 2023*; 7:00 p.m., ESPN+		Bethune–Cookman	W 98–54	9–3	19 – Sellers	7 – Sylla	5 – Langford Jr.	Addition Financial Arena (5,188); Orlando, FL
Big 12 regular season
January 6, 2024; 6:00 p.m., ESPN2		at Kansas State	L 52–77	9–4 (0–1)	10 – Johnson	7 – Avery	3 – Machowski	Bramlage Coliseum (9,698); Manhattan, KS
January 10, 2024; 7:00 p.m., ESPN+		No. 3 Kansas	W 65–60	10–4 (1–1)	18 – Sellers	6 – Allen	6 – Johnson	Addition Financial Arena (9,469); Orlando, FL
January 13, 2024; 4:00 p.m., ESPN+		No. 18 BYU	L 58–63	10–5 (1–2)	18 – Johnson	19 – Diallo	3 – Allen	Addition Financial Arena (9,137); Orlando, FL
January 17, 2024; 8:00 p.m., LHN		at Texas	W 77–71	11–5 (2–2)	24 – Sellers	9 – Walker	7 – Allen	Moody Center (11,235); Austin, TX
January 20, 2024; 2:00 p.m., ESPN+		at No. 5 Houston	L 42–57	11–6 (2–3)	10 – Avery	9 – Sellers	3 – Johnson	Fertitta Center (7,184); Houston, TX
January 23, 2024; 7:00 p.m., ESPN+		West Virginia	W 72–59	12–6 (3–3)	18 – Sellers	12 – Diallo	5 – Allen	Addition Financial Arena (8,882); Orlando, FL
January 27, 2024; 7:00 p.m., ESPN+		at Cincinnati	L 57–68	12–7 (3–4)	19 – Tied	7 – Avery	3 – Johnson	Fifth Third Arena (12,112); Cincinnati, OH
January 31, 2024; 7:00 p.m., ESPN+		No. 18 Baylor	L 69–77	12–8 (3–5)	23 – Johnson	7 – Johnson	10 – Johnson	Addition Financial Arena (8,683); Orlando, FL
February 3, 2024; 4:00 p.m., ESPN+		No. 23 Oklahoma	W 74–63	13–8 (4–5)	14 – Darthard	11 – Moore	3 – Hugley IV	Addition Financial Arena (9,387); Orlando, FL
February 10, 2024; 4:00 p.m., ESPN+		at No. 23 Texas Tech	L 63–74	13–9 (4–6)	14 – Tied	9 – Sylla	3 – Tied	United Supermarkets Arena (13,715); Lubbock, TX
February 13, 2024; 9:00 p.m., ESPN+		at No. 19 BYU	L 88–90	13–10 (4–7)	20 – Johnson	6 – Payne	3 – Johnson	Marriott Center (15,590); Provo, UT
February 17, 2024; 4:00 p.m., ESPN+		Cincinnati	L 74–76	13–11 (4–8)	16 – Johnson	6 – Diallo	7 – Allen	Addition Financial Arena (8,924); Orlando, FL
February 20, 2024; 7:00 p.m., ESPNU		at West Virginia	L 67–77	13–12 (4–9)	29 – Johnson	9 – Walker	4 – Johnson	WVU Coliseum (9,569); Morgantown, WV
February 24, 2024; 4:00 p.m., ESPN+		No. 23 Texas Tech	W 75–61	14–12 (5–9)	16 – Johnson	8 – Walker	5 – Johnson	Addition Financial Arena (8,711); Orlando, FL
February 28, 2024; 8:00 p.m., ESPN+		at Oklahoma State	W 77–71	15–12 (6–9)	17 – Johnson	6 – Walker	2 – Allen	Gallagher-Iba Arena (5,044); Stillwater, OK
March 2, 2024; 4:00 p.m., ESPN+		No. 8 Iowa State	L 52–60	15–13 (6–10)	13 – Sellers	6 – Diallo	2 – Johnson	Addition Financial Arena (9,392); Orlando, FL
March 6, 2024; 7:00 p.m., ESPN+		No. 1 Houston	L 59–67	15–14 (6–11)	15 – Walker	5 – Johnson	4 – Allen	Addition Financial Arena (9,390); Orlando, FL
March 9, 2024; 5:00 p.m., ESPN+		at TCU	W 79–77	16–14 (7–11)	33 – Johnson	9 – Johnson	6 – Allen	Schollmaier Arena (7,033); Fort Worth, TX
Big 12 tournament
March 12, 2024; 12:30 p.m., ESPN+	(12)	vs. (13) Oklahoma State; First Round	W 77–62	17–14	17 – Diallo	11 – Diallo	5 – Johnson	T-Mobile Center; Kansas City, MO
March 13, 2024; 11:30 a.m., ESPN2	(12)	vs. (5) No. 20 BYU; Second Round	L 73–87	17–15	32 – Johnson	9 – Allen	3 – Tied	T-Mobile Center (16,044); Kansas City, MO
NIT
March 19, 2024*; 9:00 p.m., ESPN+	(4)	South Florida; First Round – Villanova Bracket; War on I-4	L 77–83	17–16	24 – Sellers	9 – Avery	4 – Johnson	Addition Financial Arena (4,164); Orlando, FL
*Non-conference game. ^{#}Rankings from AP Poll. (#) Tournament seedings in parentheses. All times are in Eastern Time.
