= Omar Payne =

American basketball player (born 2000)

No. 4 – Peristeri
- Position: Center
- League: Greek Basketball League

Personal information
- Born: November 2, 2000 (age 26) Miami, Florida, U.S.
- Listed height: 2.08 m (6 ft 10 in)
- Listed weight: 109 kg (240 lb)

Career information
- High school: Osceola (Kissimmee, Florida); Montverde Academy (Montverde, Florida)
- College: Florida (2019–2021); Illinois (2021–2022); Jacksonville (2022–2023); UCF (2023–2024)
- NBA draft: 2024: undrafted
- Playing career: 2024–present

Career history
- 2024–2025: Salon Vilpas
- 2025–present: Peristeri

Career highlights
- Greek League blocks leader (2026); Korisliiga blocks leader (2025)

Samuel Omar Payne (born November 2, 2000) is an American professional basketball player for Peristeri in Greek Basketball League. He played college basketball for the Florida Gators, Illinois Fighting Illini, Jacksonville Dolphins, and UCF Knights.

== Professional career ==
Payne started his professional career in 2024 after signing with Finnish Korisliiga team Salon Vilpas for the 2024–25 season. They finished third in the league and won the bronze medal.

In June 2025, Payne joined the Athens-based club Peristeri in the Greek Basketball League. On July 15, 2026, he renewed his contract with the club for one more year.

== Career statistics ==
Legend
| GP | Games played | GS | Games started | MPG | Minutes per game |
| FG% | Field goal percentage | 3P% | 3-point field goal percentage | FT% | Free throw percentage |
| RPG | Rebounds per game | APG | Assists per game | SPG | Steals per game |
| BPG | Blocks per game | PPG | Points per game | **Bold** | Career high |

=== College ===
| Year | Team | GP | GS | MPG | FG% | 3P% | FT% | RPG | APG | SPG | BPG | PPG |
|---|---|---|---|---|---|---|---|---|---|---|---|---|
| 2019–20 | Florida | 30 | 7 | 15.1 | .614 | .000 | .371 | 3.6 | .2 | 1.1 | .3 | 3.8 |
| 2020–21 | Florida | 24 | 8 | 15.7 | .750 | .000 | .571 | 3.2 | .4 | 1.2 | .4 | 3.8 |
| 2021–22 | Illinois | 32 | 3 | 7.4 | .618 | .000 | .536 | 1.7 | .2 | .8 | .1 | 1.8 |
| 2022–23 | Jacksonville | 25 | 9 | 17.0 | .598 | 1.000 | .577 | 3.2 | .5 | 1.0 | .3 | 4.8 |
| 2023–24 | UCF | 33 | 14 | 15.1 | .567 | .250 | .625 | 3.5 | .5 | 1.4 | .5 | 4.2 |
