= 2023–24 Oklahoma Sooners men's basketball team =

American college basketball season

2023–24 Oklahoma Sooners men's basketball

Rady Children's Invitational champions
- Conference: Big 12 Conference
- Record: 20–12 (8–10 Big 12)
- Head coach: Porter Moser (3rd season)
- Assistant coaches: Armon Gates (1st season); Ryan Humphrey (2nd season); Brock Morris (1st season); Clayton Custer (1st season); Paul Jesperson (1st season)
- Home arena: Lloyd Noble Center

2023–24 Big 12 men's basketball standings
	Conf.				Overall
Team	W		L	PCT	W		L	PCT
No. 3т Houston	15	–	3	.833	32	–	5	.865
No. 8 Iowa State †	13	–	5	.722	29	–	8	.784
No. 16 Baylor	11	–	7	.611	24	–	11	.686
Texas Tech	11	–	7	.611	23	–	11	.676
BYU	10	–	8	.556	23	–	11	.676
No. 19 Kansas	10	–	8	.556	23	–	11	.676
Texas	9	–	9	.500	21	–	13	.618
TCU	9	–	9	.500	21	–	13	.618
Oklahoma	8	–	10	.444	20	–	12	.625
Kansas State	8	–	10	.444	19	–	15	.559
Cincinnati	7	–	11	.389	22	–	15	.595
UCF	7	–	11	.389	17	–	16	.515
Oklahoma State	4	–	14	.222	12	–	20	.375
West Virginia	4	–	14	.222	9	–	23	.281
† 2024 Big 12 tournament winner Rankings from AP poll

The 2023–24 Oklahoma Sooners men's basketball team represented the University of Oklahoma during the 2023–24 NCAA Division I men's basketball season. The team was by led head coach Porter Moser in his third year and played their home games at Lloyd Noble Center in Norman, Oklahoma, as members of the Big 12 Conference.

The season was the last season in the Big 12 Conference for Oklahoma as they joined the SEC on July 1, 2024.

== Previous season ==
The Sooners finished the 2022–23 season 15–17, 5–13 in Big 12 Play to finish tied in ninth place. They were defeated by Oklahoma State in the opening round of the Big 12 tournament. The Sooners missed postseason play for the first time since the 2019–20 season.

== Offseason ==
=== Departures ===
==== NBA draft ====
Player	Position
Grant Sherfield	G
Tanner Groves	F

On April 5, 2023, Grant Sherfield announced his decision to declare for the draft while putting his name into the transfer portal. Sherfield leaves the Sooners after one season where he averaged a team-high 15.9 points since transferring from Nevada. After redshirting his true freshman season, Tanner Groves ran out of eligibility following the season. Groves played two seasons with the Sooners averaging 10.9 points and 6.5 rebounds in 66 games as a starter.

==== Outgoing transfers ====
Player	Position	Height	Weight	Year	New team
Benny Schröder	G	6'7	198	Freshman	George Washington
C.J. Noland	G	6'2	229	Sophomore	North Texas
Bijan Cortes	G	6'3	194	Sophomore	Wichita State
Joe Bamisile	G	6'4	194	Junior	VCU
Jalen Hill	F	6'6	232	Senior	UNLV
Jacob Groves	F	6'9	216	Senior	Virginia

The Sooners had six scholarship players transfer out following a disappointing 15–17 season under head coach Porter Moser's second season. Senior Jalen Hill entered the NBA draft and the transfer portal after four seasons with the Sooners. Hill appeared in 122 games during his tenure and averaged a career-high 9.7 points with 5.8 rebounds in his final season with the Sooners. Hill was the longest-tenured player on the roster before his departure.

=== Additions ===
==== Incoming transfers ====
Player	Position	Height	Weight	Year	Former team
John Hugley IV	F	6'9	265	Senior	Pittsburgh
Javian McCollum	G	6'2	155	Junior	Siena
Le'Tre Darthard	G	6'4	180	Senior	Utah Valley
Rivaldo Soares	G	6'6	205	Redshirt senior	Oregon
Jalon Moore	F	6'7	209	Junior	Georgia Tech
Maks Klanjscek	G	6'5	202	Graduate Senior	Houston Christian

After losing six players to the transfer portal, the Sooners added four new transfers for head coach Porter Moser's third season. Pittsburgh transfer John Hugley IV, a former 4-star recruit, committed to the Sooners after appearing in only eight games last season to focus on his mental health. Hugley IV led the Panthers in scoring with 14.8 points and 7.9 rebounds during the 2021–22 season.

==== Recruiting ====
College recruiting information
Name	Hometown	School	Height	Weight	Commit date
Jacolb Cole; SF	Branson, MO	Link Academy	6 ft 7 in (2.01 m)	185 lb (84 kg)	Jun 11, 2022
Jacolb Cole; SF	Recruit ratings: Rivals: 247Sports: ESPN: (83)				
Kaden Cooper; SF	Atlanta, GA	The Skill Factory	6 ft 5 in (1.96 m)	180 lb (82 kg)	Nov 12, 2022
Kaden Cooper; SF	Recruit ratings: Rivals: 247Sports: ESPN: (84)				
Overall recruit ranking:
Note: In many cases, Scout, Rivals, 247Sports, On3, and ESPN may conflict in their listings of height and weight.; In these cases, the average was taken. ESPN grades are on a 100-point scale.; Sources: "Oklahoma 2023 Basketball Commitments". Rivals.; "2023 Oklahoma Basketball Commits". Scout.; "ESPN". ESPN.; "Scout.com Team Recruiting Rankings". Scout.; "2023 Team Ranking". Rivals.

The Sooners had commitments from two 4-star recruits under head coach Porter Moser entering his third season. Jacolb Cole committed to the Sooners rated as a 4-star prospect by ESPN and Rivals and a three-star by 247Sports. Cole attended USA Basketball Junior National Team April minicamp and was named one of the 16 finalists for the 2021 USA U16 National Team roster. Kaden Cooper committed to the Sooners rated as a 4-star prospect from ESPN, Rivals, On3, and 247Sports. Cole and Cooper comprised back-to-back signing classes in the ESPN100 signees joining last year's class with Milos Uzan and Otega Oweh.

== Roster ==
2023–24 Oklahoma Sooners men's basketball team
Players
Coaches

Pos.	#	Name	Height	Weight	Year	Previous school	Hometown
G	0	Le'Tre Darthard	6 ft 4 in (1.93 m)	190 lb (86 kg)	Sr	Utah Valley	Denton, TX
F/C	1	John Hugley IV	6 ft 10 in (2.08 m)	275 lb (125 kg)	RS Jr	Pittsburgh	Cleveland, OH
G	2	Javian McCollum	6 ft 2 in (1.88 m)	160 lb (73 kg)	Jr	Siena	Fort Myers, FL
G	3	Otega Oweh	6 ft 5 in (1.96 m)	210 lb (95 kg)	Fr	Blair Academy	Somerset, NJ
F	4	Kaden Cooper	6 ft 5 in (1.96 m)	190 lb (86 kg)	Fr	The Skill Factory	Ada, OK
G	5	Rivaldo Soares	6 ft 6 in (1.98 m)	215 lb (98 kg)	Sr	Oregon	Boston, MA
F	10	Sam Godwin	6 ft 10 in (2.08 m)	226 lb (103 kg)	Jr	Wofford	Ada, OK
F	11	Yaya Keita	6 ft 9 in (2.06 m)	240 lb (109 kg)	So	Missouri	St. Louis, MO
G	12	Milos Uzan	6 ft 4 in (1.93 m)	183 lb (83 kg)	Fr	Desert Pines	Las Vegas, NV
G	13	Maks Klanjseck	6 ft 5 in (1.96 m)	202 lb (92 kg)	GS	Houston Christian	Ljubljana, Slovenia
F	24	Jacolb Cole	6 ft 7 in (2.01 m)	211 lb (96 kg)	Fr	Link Academy	Bellaire, TX
F	14	Jalon Moore	6 ft 7 in (2.01 m)	222 lb (101 kg)	Jr	Georgia Tech	Birmingham, AL
G	30	Jake Moser (W)	6 ft 3 in (1.91 m)	187 lb (85 kg)	So	Loyola Academy	Norman, OK
C	45	Luke Northweather	6 ft 11 in (2.11 m)	232 lb (105 kg)	Fr	Blair Oaks	Jefferson, MO
G	55	Reid Lovelace (W)	5 ft 11 in (1.8 m)	135 lb (61 kg)	So	Crossings Christian School	Oklahoma City, OK

Head coach

- Porter Moser (Creighton)

Assistant coach(es)

- Clayton Custer (Loyola Chicago)
- Armon Gates (Kent State)
- Ryan Humphrey (Notre Dame)
- Paul Jesperson (Northern Iowa)
- Brock Morris (Snead State)

Legend

- (C) Team captain
- (S) Suspended
- (I) Ineligible
- (W) Walk-on
- Injured
- Current redshirt

Roster
Last update: September 6, 2023

== Schedule and results ==
Date time, TV	Rank^{#}	Opponent^{#}	Result	Record	High points	High rebounds	High assists	Site (attendance) city, state
Non-conference regular season
November 6, 2023*; 7:00 p.m., ESPN+		Central Michigan	W 89–59	1–0	19 – McCollum	8 – Oweh	4 – Uzan	Lloyd Noble Center (6,025); Norman, OK
November 10, 2023*; 7:00 p.m., ESPN+		Mississippi Valley State	W 82–43	2–0	20 – Oweh	11 – Godwin	4 – McCollum	Lloyd Noble Center (5,447); Norman, OK
November 14, 2023*; 7:00 p.m., ESPN+		Texas State	W 93–54	3–0	15 – McCollum	8 – Soares	5 – Uzan	Lloyd Noble Center (4,859); Norman, OK
November 17, 2023*; 7:00 p.m., ESPN+		UT Rio Grande Valley	W 90–66	4–0	16 – Hugley IV	12 – Godwin	4 – Tied	Lloyd Noble Center (4,686); Norman, OK
November 23, 2023*; 2:00 p.m., FS1		vs. Iowa; Rady Children's Invitational Semifinal	W 79–67	5–0	18 – Moore	5 – Tied	9 – Uzan	LionTree Arena (3,500); San Diego, CA
November 24, 2023*; 2:30 p.m., FOX		vs. No. 23 USC; Rady Children's Invitational Championship Game	W 72–70	6–0	18 – McCollum	6 – Moore	4 – Uzan	LionTree Arena (3,912); San Diego, CA
November 30, 2023*; 7:00 p.m., ESPN+	No. 25	Arkansas–Pine Bluff	W 107–86	7–0	20 – Oweh	10 – Hugley IV	8 – Uzan	McCasland Field House (3,594); Norman, OK
December 5, 2023*; 6:00 p.m., ESPNU	No. 19	Providence; Big East–Big 12 Battle	W 72–51	8–0	19 – McCollum	12 – Uzan	4 – McCollum	Lloyd Noble Center (7,234); Norman, OK
December 9, 2023*; 3:00 p.m., ESPN2	No. 19	vs. Arkansas; Crimson & Cardinal Classic	W 79–70	9–0	20 – McCollum	7 – Soares	4 – McCollum	BOK Center (17,485); Tulsa, OK
December 16, 2023*; 8:00 p.m., ESPN+	No. 11	Green Bay	W 81–47	10–0	13 – Soares	8 – Moore	8 – McCollum	Lloyd Noble Center (7,012); Norman, OK
December 20, 2023*; 8:00 p.m., ESPN	No. 7	vs. No. 11 North Carolina; Jumpman Invitational	L 69–81	10–1	23 – Oweh	8 – Soares	3 – McCollum	Spectrum Center (16,344); Charlotte, NC
December 28, 2023*; 6:00 p.m., ESPN+	No. 12	Central Arkansas	W 88–72	11–1	23 – McCollum	9 – Moore	5 – Darthard	Lloyd Noble Center (5,692); Norman, OK
December 31, 2023*; 2:00 p.m., ESPN+	No. 12	Monmouth	W 72–56	12–1	21 – Moore	7 – Godwin	8 – Tied	Lloyd Noble Center (6,683); Norman, OK
Big 12 regular season
January 6, 2024; 5:00 p.m., ESPN+	No. 11	Iowa State	W 71–63	13–1 (1–0)	15 – McCollum	9 – Soares	5 – Tied	Lloyd Noble Center (11,333); Norman, OK
January 10, 2024; 8:00 p.m., ESPN2	No. 9	at TCU	L 71–80	13–2 (1–1)	17 – McCollum	7 – Uzan	10 – Uzan	Schollmaier Arena (6,864); Fort Worth, TX
January 13, 2024; 1:00 p.m., ESPN+	No. 9	at No. 3 Kansas	L 66–78	13–3 (1–2)	17 – McCollum	11 – Moore	3 – Tied	Allen Fieldhouse (16,300); Lawrence, KS
January 17, 2024; 7:00 p.m., ESPN+	No. 15	West Virginia	W 77–63	14–3 (2–2)	16 – Moore	10 – Oweh	5 – Tied	Lloyd Noble Center (6,835); Norman, OK
January 20, 2024; 12:00 p.m., ESPN+	No. 15	at Cincinnati	W 69–65	15–3 (3–2)	16 – McCollum	10 – Moore	3 – Tied	Fifth Third Arena (12,406); Cincinnati, OH
January 23, 2024; 6:00 p.m., ESPN	No. 11	Texas	L 60–75	15–4 (3–3)	15 – Moore	7 – Hugley IV	4 – Tied	Lloyd Noble Center (11,092); Norman, OK
January 27, 2024; 1:00 p.m., ESPN+	No. 11	No. 20 Texas Tech	L 84–85	15–5 (3–4)	19 – Soares	10 – Soares	5 – Uzan	Lloyd Noble Center (10,890); Norman, OK
January 30, 2024; 7:00 p.m., ESPN+	No. 23	at Kansas State	W 73–53	16–5 (4–4)	23 – Moore	9 – Moore	6 – Uzan	Bramlage Coliseum (9,955); Manhattan, KS
February 3, 2024; 3:00 p.m., ESPN+	No. 23	at UCF	L 63–74	16–6 (4–5)	14 – Darthard	11 – Moore	2 – Tied	Addition Financial Arena (9,387); Orlando, FL
February 6, 2024; 7:00 p.m., ESPN+		No. 21 BYU	W 82–66	17–6 (5–5)	20 – McCollum	8 – Godwin	4 – Uzan	Lloyd Noble Center (6,834); Norman, OK
February 10, 2024; 6:00 p.m., ESPN+		Oklahoma State; Bedlam Series	W 66–62	18–6 (6–5)	15 – Moore	8 – Moore	6 – Uzan	Lloyd Noble Center (11,456); Norman, OK
February 13, 2024; 8:00 p.m., ESPN2	No. 25	at No. 12 Baylor	L 62–79	18–7 (6–6)	17 – Soares	5 – Soares	4 – Tied	Foster Pavilion (7,500); Waco, TX
February 17, 2024; 3:00 p.m., ESPN	No. 25	No. 6 Kansas	L 57–67	18–8 (6–7)	17 – Moore	8 – Moore	4 – Uzan	Lloyd Noble Center (11,308); Norman, OK
February 24, 2024; 3:00 p.m., ESPN2		at Oklahoma State; Bedlam Series	W 84–82 ^{OT}	19–8 (7–7)	20 – Soares	14 – Moore	3 – Godwin	Gallagher-Iba Arena (11,370); Stillwater, OK
February 28, 2024; 7:00 p.m., ESPN+		at No. 8 Iowa State	L 45–58	19–9 (7–8)	9 – Soares	7 – Soares	3 – Uzan	Hilton Coliseum (14,267); Ames, IA
March 2, 2024; 7:00 p.m., ESPN2		No. 1 Houston	L 85–87	19–10 (7–9)	17 – Godwin	10 – Moore	8 – McCollum	Lloyd Noble Center (10,960); Norman, OK
March 5, 2024; 7:00 p.m., ESPN+		Cincinnati	W 74–71 ^{OT}	20–10 (8–9)	18 – Darthard	9 – Soares	3 – Tied	Lloyd Noble Center (6,124); Norman, OK
March 9, 2024; 1:00 p.m., ESPN		at Texas	L 80–94	20–11 (8–10)	21 – Soares	9 – Moore	7 – Uzan	Moody Center (11,073); Austin, TX
Big 12 tournament
March 13, 2024; 2:00 p.m., ESPN+	(9)	vs. (8) TCU; Second Round	L 70–77	20–12	16 – Tied	9 – Moore	4 – Uzan	T-Mobile Center (16,044); Kansas City, MO
*Non-conference game. ^{#}Rankings from AP Poll. (#) Tournament seedings in parentheses. All times are in Central Time.

== Rankings ==
Ranking movements Legend: ██ Increase in ranking ██ Decrease in ranking — = Not ranked RV = Received votes т = Tied with team above or below
	Week																				
Poll	Pre	1	2	3	4	5	6	7	8	9	10	11	12	13	14	15	16	17	18	19	Final
AP	—	—	RV	25	19	11	7	12	11	9	15	11	23	RV	25	—	RV	—	—	—	—
Coaches	—	—	—	RV	22	12	8	13	11	9	16	13	24	RV	21т	RV	RV	RV	RV	—	—
