= 2023–24 Kansas Jayhawks men's basketball team =

American college basketball season

2023–24 Kansas Jayhawks men's basketball
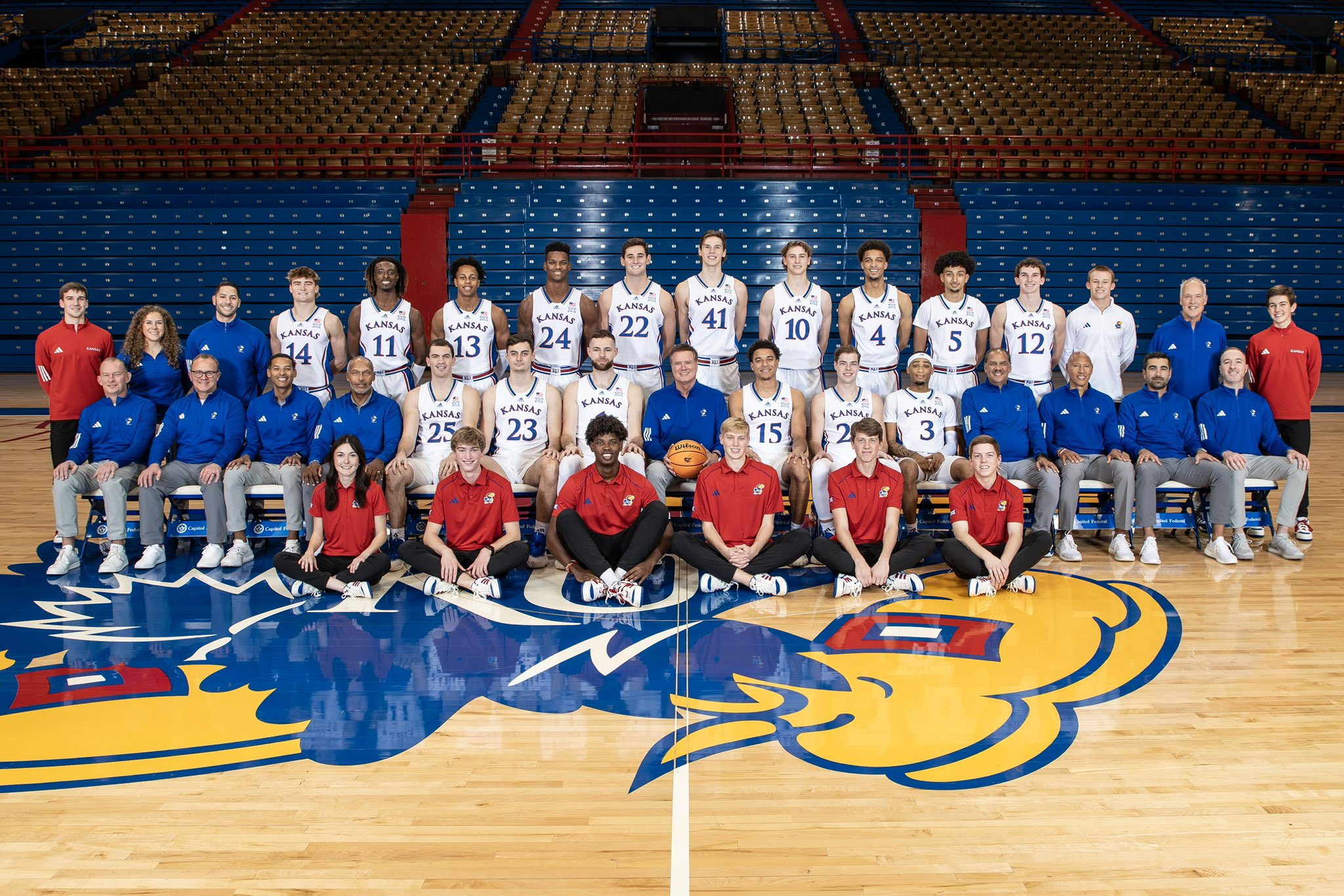

NCAA tournament, Second Round
- Conference: Big 12 Conference

Ranking
- Coaches: No. 21
- AP: No. 19
- Record: 23–11 (10–8 Big 12)
- Head coach: Bill Self (21st season)
- Assistant coaches: Jeremy Case (3rd season); Norm Roberts (13th season); Kurtis Townsend (20th season)
- Home arena: Allen Fieldhouse

2023–24 Big 12 men's basketball standings
	Conf.				Overall
Team	W		L	PCT	W		L	PCT
No. 3т Houston	15	–	3	.833	32	–	5	.865
No. 8 Iowa State †	13	–	5	.722	29	–	8	.784
No. 16 Baylor	11	–	7	.611	24	–	11	.686
Texas Tech	11	–	7	.611	23	–	11	.676
BYU	10	–	8	.556	23	–	11	.676
No. 19 Kansas	10	–	8	.556	23	–	11	.676
Texas	9	–	9	.500	21	–	13	.618
TCU	9	–	9	.500	21	–	13	.618
Oklahoma	8	–	10	.444	20	–	12	.625
Kansas State	8	–	10	.444	19	–	15	.559
Cincinnati	7	–	11	.389	22	–	15	.595
UCF	7	–	11	.389	17	–	16	.515
Oklahoma State	4	–	14	.222	12	–	20	.375
West Virginia	4	–	14	.222	9	–	23	.281
† 2024 Big 12 tournament winner Rankings from AP poll

The 2023–24 Kansas Jayhawks men's basketball team represented the University of Kansas in the 2023–24 NCAA Division I men's basketball season, which was the Jayhawks' 126th basketball season. The Jayhawks, members of the Big 12 Conference, played their home games at Allen Fieldhouse in Lawrence, Kansas. The Kansas Jayhawks men's basketball team drew an average home attendance of 16,300 in 2023–24.

The Jayhawks were led by 21st year Hall of Fame head coach Bill Self. The Jayhawks underwent higher than normal turnover with nine players leaving the team, including consensus All-American Jalen Wilson. Only three players from the previous season that averaged more than 10 minutes per game returned for Kansas as well as only 3 scholarship players. The Jayhawks entire 2022 recruiting class left the program in some way in the offseason. Despite the unusually large turnover on the roster, Kansas entered the season ranked first in the preseason AP poll for the fourth time in the history of the poll and the first time since the 2018–19 season. Kansas finished conference play with 8 losses, their most conference losses since the 1988–89 season. Kansas received an at-large bid to the NCAA tournament and were eliminated in the second round by Gonzaga. Kansas finished the season with 11 losses, which is the most under Bill Self and the most since the 1988–89 season. Kansas’ 76–46 loss to Houston is the least number of points scored by the Jayhawks in a conference game since the shot clock’s introduction in the 1985–86 season.

== Offseason ==
=== Coaching staff changes ===
The Jayhawks had no changes to their coaching staff.

=== Entered NBA draft ===
Players listed below are underclassmen who have entered the 2023 NBA draft. Class provided is class from previous season.

Name	Position	Class	Returned?
Gradey Dick	Guard	Freshman	No
Jalen Wilson	Forward	RS Junior	No

=== Transfers ===
==== Incoming ====
Name	Position	Class	Old school
Parker Braun	Forward	RS Senior	Santa Clara
Hunter Dickinson	Center	Senior	Michigan
Nick Timberlake	Guard	Super Senior	Towson

==== Outgoing ====
Name	Position	Class	New school
Kyle Cuffe Jr.	Guard	Sophomore	Syracuse
Zuby Ejiofor	Center	Sophomore	St. John's
Cam Martin	Center	Super Senior	Boise State
Bobby Pettiford Jr.	Guard	Junior	East Carolina
M. J. Rice	Forward	Sophomore	NC State
Ernest Udeh	Center	Sophomore	TCU
Joseph Yesufu	Guard	Senior	Washington State

=== Walk-ons ===
Name	Position
Justin Cross	F
Patrick Cassidy	G

=== 2023 recruiting class ===
College recruiting information
Name	Hometown	School	Height	Weight	Commit date
Elmarko Jackson; Guard	South Kent, CT	South Kent	6 ft 3 in (1.91 m)	180 lb (82 kg)	Oct 13, 2022
Elmarko Jackson; Guard	Recruit ratings: Rivals: 247Sports: ESPN: (88)				
Jamari McDowell; Guard	Manvel, TX	Manvel	6 ft 3 in (1.91 m)	180 lb (82 kg)	Sep 24, 2022
Jamari McDowell; Guard	Recruit ratings: Rivals: 247Sports: ESPN: (81)				
Johnny Furphy; Forward	Melbourne, Australia	Centre of Excellence	6 ft 7 in (2.01 m)	180 lb (82 kg)	Aug 2, 2023
Johnny Furphy; Forward	Recruit ratings: Rivals: 247Sports: ESPN: (N/A)				
Overall recruiting rankings: 247 Sports: 9 Rivals: 12 ESPN: 9

== Roster ==
2023–24 Kansas Jayhawks men's basketball team
Players
Coaches

Pos.	#	Name	Height	Weight	Year	Hometown
G	--	Charlie McCarthy (W)	6 ft 2 in (1.88 m)	195 lb (88 kg)	Jr	Rancho Mirage, CA
C	1	Hunter Dickinson	7 ft 2 in (2.18 m)	260 lb (118 kg)	Sr	Alexandria, VA
G	3	Dajuan Harris Jr.	6 ft 2 in (1.88 m)	170 lb (77 kg)	RS Jr	Columbia, MO
G	4	Justin Cross (W)	6 ft 8 in (2.03 m)	200 lb (91 kg)	Jr	Oak Park, IL
G	5	Chris Carter (W)	6 ft 4 in (1.93 m)	190 lb (86 kg)	RS Fr	Indio, CA
G	10	Johnny Furphy	6 ft 8 in (2.03 m)	202 lb (92 kg)	Fr	Melbourne, Australia
G	11	Jamari McDowell	6 ft 4 in (1.93 m)	180 lb (82 kg)	Fr	Manvel, TX
G	12	Wilder Evers (W)	6 ft 4 in (1.93 m)	185 lb (84 kg)	Fr	Birmingham, AL
G	13	Elmarko Jackson	6 ft 3 in (1.91 m)	195 lb (88 kg)	Fr	Marlton, NJ
G	14	Patrick Cassidy (W)	6 ft 1 in (1.85 m)	185 lb (84 kg)	Jr	Columbus, KS
G	15	Kevin McCullar Jr. (injured)	6 ft 7 in (2.01 m)	212 lb (96 kg)	RS Sr	San Antonio, TX
G	20	Michael Jankovich (W)	6 ft 4 in (1.93 m)	190 lb (86 kg)	Sr	Dallas, TX
F	22	Dillon Wilhite (W)	6 ft 9 in (2.06 m)	240 lb (109 kg)	RS Fr	San Diego, CA
F	23	Parker Braun	6 ft 10 in (2.08 m)	235 lb (107 kg)	RS Sr	Burlington, KS
F	24	K. J. Adams Jr.	6 ft 7 in (2.01 m)	235 lb (107 kg)	Jr	Austin, TX
G	25	Nick Timberlake	6 ft 4 in (1.93 m)	195 lb (88 kg)	Sr	Braintree, MA
F	41	Zach Clemence (redshirt)	6 ft 11 in (2.11 m)	230 lb (104 kg)	Jr	San Antonio, TX

Head coach

- Bill Self (Oklahoma State)

Assistant coach(es)

- Norm Roberts (Queens (NY))
- Kurtis Townsend (Western Kentucky)
- Jeremy Case (Kansas)

Legend

- (C) Team captain
- (S) Suspended
- (I) Ineligible
- (W) Walk-on
- Injured
- Current redshirt

Roster
Last update: September 29, 2023

== Schedule ==
Date time, TV	Rank^{#}	Opponent^{#}	Result	Record	High points	High rebounds	High assists	Site (attendance) city, state
Exhibition
August 3, 2023*; 11:00 am, –		vs. Puerto Rico Select Team; Puerto Rico Exhibition	W 106–71	–	20 – Morris	7 – McCullar Jr.	9 – Harris	Coliseo Rubén Rodríguez (100); Bayamón, Puerto Rico
August 5, 2023*; 4:00 pm, –		vs. Bahamian National Team; Puerto Rico Exhibition	W 92–87	–	28 – Dickinson	7 – Morris	9 – Harris Jr.	Coliseo Ruben Rodriguez (100); Bayamón, Puerto Rico
August 7, 2023*; 11:00 am, –		vs. Bahamian National Team; Puerto Rico Exhibition	L 81–87	–	23 – Harris Jr.	9 – Dickinson	7 – McCullar Jr.	Coliseo Ruben Rodriguez (200); Bayamón, Puerto Rico
October 29, 2023*; 5:00 pm, BTN	No. 1	at No. 25 Illinois; Maui Strong Fund game	L 75–82	–	25 – McCullar Jr.	9 – Dickinson	8 – Harris Jr.	State Farm Center (12,592); Champaign, IL
November 1, 2023*; 7:00 pm, ESPN+	No. 1	Fort Hays State	W 73–55	–	21 – McCullar Jr.	11 – Dickinson	8 – Harris Jr.	Allen Fieldhouse (16,300); Lawrence, KS
Non-conference
November 6, 2023*; 7:00 pm, ESPN+	No. 1	North Carolina Central; John McLendon Classic	W 99–56	1–0	22 – McCullar Jr.	8 – Dickinson	10 – Harris Jr.	Allen Fieldhouse (16,300); Lawrence, KS
November 10, 2023*; 7:00 pm, ESPN+	No. 1	Manhattan	W 99–61	2–0	18 – Dickinson	8 – Dickinson	10 – Jackson	Allen Fieldhouse (16,300); Lawrence, KS
November 14, 2023*; 8:30 pm, ESPN	No. 1	vs. No. 17 Kentucky; Champions Classic	W 89–84	3–0	27 – Dickinson	21 – Dickinson	10 – McCullar Jr.	United Center (18,780); Chicago, IL
November 20, 2023*; 8:00 pm, ESPNU	No. 1	vs. Chaminade; Maui Invitational First round	W 83–56	4–0	31 – Dickinson	11 – Tied	10 – McCullar Jr.	Stan Sheriff Center (4,838); Honolulu, HI
November 21, 2023*; 9:30 pm, ESPN	No. 1	vs. No. 4 Marquette; Maui Invitational Semifinals	L 59–73	4–1	24 – McCullar Jr.	8 – Tied	3 – Tied	Stan Sheriff Center (5,527); Honolulu, HI
November 22, 2023*; 1:30 pm, ESPN	No. 1	vs. No. 7 Tennessee; Maui Invitational 3rd place game	W 69–60	5–1	17 – Dickinson	20 – Dickinson	8 – Harris Jr.	Stan Sheriff Center (5,164); Honolulu, HI
November 28, 2023*; 7:00 pm, ESPN+	No. 5	Eastern Illinois	W 71–63	6–1	25 – Dickinson	13 – Dickinson	9 – Harris Jr.	Allen Fieldhouse (16,300); Lawrence, KS
December 1, 2023*; 8:00 pm, ESPN2	No. 5	No. 4 UConn; Big East–Big 12 Battle	W 69–65	7–1	21 – McCullar Jr.	10 – Dickinson	6 – Harris Jr.	Allen Fieldhouse (16,300); Lawrence, KS
December 5, 2023*; 7:00 pm, ESPN+	No. 2	Kansas City	W 88–69	8–1	25 – McCullar Jr.	12 – Dickinson	7 – Harris Jr.	Allen Fieldhouse (16,300); Lawrence, KS
December 9, 2023*; 4:15 pm, ESPN	No. 2	Missouri; Border War	W 73–64	9–1	17 – Tied	16 – Dickinson	5 – Tied	Allen Fieldhouse (16,300); Lawrence, KS
December 16, 2023*; 11:30 am, CBS	No. 2	at Indiana	W 75–71	10–1	21 – McCullar Jr.	14 – Dickinson	5 – Harris Jr.	Simon Skjodt Assembly Hall (17,222); Bloomington, IN
December 22, 2023*; 7:00 pm, ESPN+	No. 2	Yale	W 75–60	11–1	34 – McCullar Jr.	10 – Dickinson	6 – Harris Jr.	Allen Fieldhouse (16,300); Lawrence, KS
December 30, 2023*; 3:00 pm, ESPN2	No. 2	vs. Wichita State	W 86–67	12–1	22 – Dickinson	13 – Dickinson	9 – Harris Jr.	T-Mobile Center (18,702); Kansas City, MO
Big 12
January 6, 2024; 1:00 pm, CBS	No. 2	TCU	W 83–81	13–1 (1–0)	30 – Dickinson	11 – Dickinson	8 – Harris Jr.	Allen Fieldhouse (16,300); Lawrence, KS
January 10, 2024; 6:00 pm, ESPN+	No. 3	at UCF	L 60–65	13–2 (1–1)	16 – McCullar Jr.	7 – Adams	8 – Harris Jr.	Addition Financial Arena (9,469); Orlando, FL
January 13, 2024; 1:00 pm, ESPN+	No. 3	No. 9 Oklahoma	W 78–66	14–2 (2–1)	24 – Dickinson	14 – Dickinson	8 – Harris Jr.	Allen Fieldhouse (16,300); Lawrence, KS
January 16, 2024; 8:00 pm, ESPN	No. 3	at Oklahoma State	W 90–66	15–2 (3–1)	21 – Dickinson	7 – Tied	5 – Adams	Gallagher-Iba Arena (8,570); Stillwater, OK
January 20, 2024; 3:00 pm, ESPN+	No. 3	at West Virginia	L 85–91	15–3 (3–2)	24 – McCullar Jr.	7 – Furphy	5 – Tied	WVU Coliseum (11,565); Morgantown, WV
January 22, 2024; 8:00 pm, ESPN	No. 7	Cincinnati	W 74–69	16–3 (4–2)	23 – Furphy	11 – Furphy	11 – Harris Jr.	Allen Fieldhouse (16,300); Lawrence, KS
January 27, 2024; 12:30 pm, CBS	No. 7	at No. 23 Iowa State	L 75–79	16–4 (4–3)	20 – Dickinson	15 – Dickinson	6 – Harris Jr.	Hilton Coliseum (14,267); Ames, IA
January 30, 2024; 8:00 pm, ESPN	No. 8	Oklahoma State	W 83–54	17–4 (5–3)	16 – Tied	11 – Dickinson	7 – Harris Jr.	Allen Fieldhouse (16,300); Lawrence, KS
February 3, 2024; 3:00 pm, ESPN	No. 8	No. 4 Houston	W 78–65	18–4 (6–3)	20 – Dickinson	8 – Tied	7 – Adams	Allen Fieldhouse (16,300); Lawrence, KS
February 5, 2024; 8:00 pm, ESPN	No. 4	at Kansas State; Sunflower Showdown	L 70–75 ^{OT}	18–5 (6–4)	21 – Dickinson	12 – Dickinson	8 – Harris Jr.	Bramlage Coliseum (11,010); Manhattan, KS
February 10, 2024; 5:00 pm, ESPN	No. 4	No. 13 Baylor	W 64–61	19–5 (7–4)	15 – Dickinson	7 – Dickinson	5 – Harris Jr.	Allen Fieldhouse (16,300); Lawrence, KS
February 12, 2024; 8:00 pm, ESPN	No. 6	at Texas Tech	L 50–79	19–6 (7–5)	13 – Tied	7 – Tied	3 – Tied	United Supermarkets Arena (15,098); Lubbock, TX
February 17, 2024; 3:00 pm, ESPN	No. 6	at No. 25 Oklahoma	W 67–57	20–6 (8–5)	20 – Dickinson	16 – Dickinson	7 – Harris Jr.	Lloyd Noble Center (11,308); Norman, OK
February 24, 2024; 5:00 pm, ESPN	No. 9	Texas	W 86–67	21–6 (9–5)	20 – Dickinson	8 – Tied	6 – Harris Jr.	Allen Fieldhouse (16,300); Lawrence, KS
February 27, 2024; 7:00 pm, ESPN+	No. 7	BYU	L 68–76	21–7 (9–6)	17 – Dickinson	11 – Dickinson	6 – Harris	Allen Fieldhouse (16,300); Lawrence, KS
March 2, 2024; 12:00 pm, ABC	No. 7	at No. 15 Baylor	L 74–82	21–8 (9–7)	20 – Tied	6 – Dickinson	9 – Harris Jr.	Foster Pavilion (7,500); Waco, TX
March 5, 2024; 8:00 pm, ESPN	No. 14	Kansas State; Sunflower Showdown	W 90–68	22–8 (10–7)	19 – McCullar Jr.	20 – Dickinson	7 – Harris Jr.	Allen Fieldhouse (16,300); Lawrence, KS
March 9, 2024; 3:00 pm, ESPN	No. 14	at No. 1 Houston	L 46–76	22–9 (10–8)	11 – Dickinson	6 – Dickinson	4 – Furphy	Fertitta Center (7,933); Houston, TX
Big 12 Tournament
March 13, 2024; 8:30 pm, ESPN2	(6) No. 16	vs. (11) Cincinnati; Second Round	L 52–72	22–10	22 – Adams	9 – Jackson	5 – Harris	T-Mobile Center (18,261); Kansas City, MO
NCAA Tournament
March 21, 2024; 8:55 pm, TBS	(4 MW) No. 17	vs. (13 MW) Samford; First Round	W 93–89	23–10	20 – Adams	20 – Dickinson	7 – Harris Jr.	Delta Center (17,404); Salt Lake City, UT
March 23, 2024; 2:15 pm, CBS	(4 MW) No. 17	vs. (5 MW) No. 18 Gonzaga; Second Round	L 68–89	23–11	15 – Dickinson	7 – Furphy	11 – Harris Jr.	Delta Center (17,414); Salt Lake City, UT
*Non-conference game. ^{#}Rankings from AP Poll. (#) Tournament seedings in parentheses. MW=Midwest region. All times are in Central Time.

== Rankings ==
Ranking movements Legend: ██ Increase in ranking ██ Decrease in ranking ( ) = First-place votes
	Week																				
Poll	Pre	1	2	3	4	5	6	7	8	9	10	11	12	13	14	15	16	17	18	19	Final
AP	1 (46)	1 (51)	1 (52)	5	2 (1)	2	2 (6)	2 (5)	2 (5)	3 (2)	3 (3)	7	8	4	6	9	7	14	16	17	19
Coaches	1 (23)	1 (25)	1 (25)	6	3 (1)	2 (1)	2 (3)	2 (1)	2 (1)	3 (1)	4	8	9	4	7	10	9	15	17	20	21
