= Elmarko Jackson =

American basketball player (born 2004)

No. 9 – Georgetown Hoyas
- Position: Point guard / shooting guard
- Conference: Big East Conference

Personal information
- Born: April 13, 2004 (age 22) Marlton, New Jersey, U.S.
- Listed height: 6 ft 3 in (1.91 m)
- Listed weight: 195 lb (88 kg)

Career information
- High school: St. Augustine Preparatory (Richland, New Jersey); Academy of the New Church (Bryn Athyn, Pennsylvania); South Kent School (South Kent, Connecticut)
- College: Kansas (2023–2026); Georgetown (2026–present)

Career highlights
- McDonald's All-American (2023)

Elmarko Demetrius Jackson Jr. (born April 13, 2004) is an American college basketball player for the Georgetown Hoyas of the Big East Conference. He previously played for the Kansas Jayhawks. Jackson was a consensus four-star recruit in the 2023 class.

== Early life and high school career ==
Jackson grew up in the Marlton section of Evesham Township, New Jersey, and initially attended St. Augustine Preparatory School. Jackson was primarily a lacrosse player throughout his early life, and did not begin playing basketball regularly until his sophomore year of high school.

After his sophomore year, Jackson transferred to the Academy of the New Church in Bryn Athyn, Pennsylvania. He averaged 17.9 points, 5.7 rebounds, 5.4 assists, and 2 steals per game there as a junior and was named first-team All-Friends School League and to the non-PIAA All-State team. He transferred to the South Kent School in South Kent, Connecticut for his senior year. Jackson was selected to play in the 2023 McDonald's All-American Boys Game during his senior year.

=== Recruiting ===
Jackson was a consensus four-star recruit and one of the top players in the 2023 class, according to major recruiting services. On October 13, 2022, he committed to play college basketball for Kansas over offers from Texas, Maryland, Notre Dame, and Miami.

College recruiting
Name	Hometown	School	Height	Weight	Commit date
Elmarko Jackson; PG / SG	Marlton, NJ	South Kent School (CT)	6 ft 3 in (1.91 m)	185 lb (84 kg)	Oct 13, 2022
Elmarko Jackson; PG / SG	Recruit ratings: Rivals: 247Sports: On3: ESPN: (88)				
Overall recruit ranking: Rivals: 25 247Sports: 20 On3: 19 ESPN: 26
Note: In many cases, Scout, Rivals, 247Sports, On3, and ESPN may conflict in their listings of height and weight.; In these cases, the average was taken. ESPN grades are on a 100-point scale.; Sources: "Kansas 2023 Basketball Commitments". Rivals.; "2023 Kansas Jayhawks Recruiting Class". ESPN.; "2023 Team Ranking". Rivals.

== College career ==
=== Kansas ===
Jackson enrolled at Kansas in June 2023. He played in the Jayhawks' exhibition series in Puerto Rico and averaged 10.6 points over three games. Jackson entered the season as a starter for the Jayhawks, but was moved to the bench midway through the season. He finished the season averaging 4.3 points, 1.4 rebounds, and 1.7 assists per game.

In September 2024, Jackson suffered a torn patellar tendon during an offseason workout, causing him to miss the entire 2024–25 season.

In his third season at Kansas, Jackson averaged 4.8 points per game. At the conclusion of the season, he announced that he would enter the NCAA transfer portal, and stated that he was looking for "a fresh start."

=== Georgetown ===
On April 16, 2026 it was announced that Jackson would transfer from Kansas to Georgetown.

== Career statistics ==
Legend
GP	Games played	GS	Games started	MPG	Minutes per game
FG%	Field goal percentage	3P%	3-point field goal percentage	FT%	Free throw percentage
RPG	Rebounds per game	APG	Assists per game	SPG	Steals per game
BPG	Blocks per game	PPG	Points per game	**Bold**	Career high

=== College ===
Year	Team	GP	GS	MPG	FG%	3P%	FT%	RPG	APG	SPG	BPG	PPG
2023–24	Kansas	**34**	**17**	**18.6**	**.406**	.267	.769	1.4	**1.7**	**.8**	.1	4.3
2024–25	Kansas	Redshirt (redshirt)										
2025–26	Kansas	**34**	1	17.8	.381	**.372**	**.825**	**1.8**	1.4	.7	**.2**	**4.8**
Career		68	18	18.2	.394	.318	.804	1.6	1.6	.8	.2	4.6

== Personal life ==
Jackson's uncle, Marlin Jackson, played in the NFL from 2005 to 2010. He is Jamaican-American.
