= 2023–24 West Virginia Mountaineers men's basketball team =

American college basketball season

2023–24 West Virginia Mountaineers men's basketball
- Conference: Big 12 Conference
- Record: 9–23 (4–14 Big 12)
- Head coach: Josh Eilert (interim)
- Assistant coaches: DerMarr Johnson; Da'Sean Butler; Alex Ruoff; Jordan McCabe
- Home arena: WVU Coliseum

2023–24 Big 12 men's basketball standings
	Conf.				Overall
Team	W		L	PCT	W		L	PCT
No. 3т Houston	15	–	3	.833	32	–	5	.865
No. 8 Iowa State †	13	–	5	.722	29	–	8	.784
No. 16 Baylor	11	–	7	.611	24	–	11	.686
Texas Tech	11	–	7	.611	23	–	11	.676
BYU	10	–	8	.556	23	–	11	.676
No. 19 Kansas	10	–	8	.556	23	–	11	.676
Texas	9	–	9	.500	21	–	13	.618
TCU	9	–	9	.500	21	–	13	.618
Oklahoma	8	–	10	.444	20	–	12	.625
Kansas State	8	–	10	.444	19	–	15	.559
Cincinnati	7	–	11	.389	22	–	15	.595
UCF	7	–	11	.389	17	–	16	.515
Oklahoma State	4	–	14	.222	12	–	20	.375
West Virginia	4	–	14	.222	9	–	23	.281
† 2024 Big 12 tournament winner Rankings from AP poll

The 2023–24 West Virginia Mountaineers men's basketball team represented West Virginia University during the 2023–24 NCAA Division I men's basketball season. The Mountaineers were coached by interim head coach Josh Eilert, and played their home games at the WVU Coliseum in Morgantown, West Virginia as members of the Big 12 Conference. Following the dismissal of longtime head coach Bob Huggins in the offseason, the Mountaineers finished the season with a 9–23 record (4–14 in Big 12 play), their worst record since the 2001–02 season.

== Previous season ==
The Mountaineers finished the 2022–23 season 19–15, 7–11 in Big 12 Play to finish in eighth place. They lost in the quarterfinals of the Big 12 tournament to Kansas. They received an at-large bid to the NCAA tournament as the No. 9 seed in the South region, where they were defeated by Maryland in the first round.

== Offseason ==
=== Coaching change ===
On June 16, 2023, head coach Bob Huggins was arrested in Pittsburgh and charged with driving while under the influence of alcohol. Police officers reported that they found him in an SUV that was blocking traffic, with the driver's door ajar and with a "flat and shredded tire". Bags of empty beer containers were found in the vehicle. A breath test determined his blood alcohol content to be 0.21%, more than two times the legal limit of 0.08%. Officers asked Huggins what city he was in, and did not get a clear response, with Huggins making mention of Columbus, Ohio a few times. The next day, Huggins released a statement announcing his resignation from West Virginia. In the statement, he also announced his retirement.

On June 24, 2023, assistant coach Josh Eilert was promoted to interim head coach after Huggins resigned.

=== Departures ===
Name	Pos.	Number	Height	Weight	Previous school	Hometown	Reason for leaving
Kedrian Johnson	0	G	6'3"	185	GS senior	Dallas, TX	Graduated
Emmitt Matthews Jr.	1	F	6'7"	215	GS senior	Tacoma, WA	Graduated
Tre Mitchell	3	C	6'9"	225	Senior	Pittsburgh, PA	Graduate transferred to Kentucky
Jamel King	4	F	6'7"	190	Sophomore	Uniontown, AL	Transferred to Kennesaw State
Joe Toussaint	5	G	6'0"	190	Senior	Bronx, NY	Graduate transferred to Texas Tech
Erik Stevenson	10	G	6'4"	205	GS senior	Lacey, WA	Graduated
Mohamed Wague	11	F	6'10"	225	Sophomore	Bronx, NY	Transferred to Alabama
Josiah Davis	12	G	6'3"	190	Freshman	Kitchener, ON	Transferred to Tennessee Tech
Jimmy Bell Jr.	15	F	6'10"	295	Senior	Saginaw, MI	Graduate transferred to Mississippi State
James Oknokwo	32	F	6'8"	230	Sophomore	Maidenhead, England	Transferred to North Carolina

=== Incoming transfers ===
Name	Number	Pos.	Height	Weight	Year	Hometown	Previous school
Noah Farrakhan	1	G	6'2"	162	Junior	Hillside, NJ	Eastern Michigan
Kerr Kriisa	3	G	6'3"	190	Senior	Tartu, Estonia	Arizona
Jeremiah Bembry	5	F	6'6"	185	RS freshman	Brooklyn, NY	Florida State
Jesse Edwards	7	C	6'11"	230	GS senior	Amsterdam, Netherlands	Syracuse
Quinn Slazinski	11	F	6'9"	215	GS senior	Houston, TX	Iona
Akok Akok	13	F	6'9"	205	GS senior	Manchester, NH	Georgetown
RaeQuan Battle	21	G	6'5"	190	Senior	Tulalip, WA	Montana State

=== Recruiting classes ===
==== 2023 recruiting class ====
College recruiting
Name	Hometown	School	Height	Weight	Commit date
Ofri Naveh; PF	Israel	N/A	6 ft 7 in (2.01 m)	185 lb (84 kg)	Jul 28, 2023
Ofri Naveh; PF	Recruit ratings: Rivals: 247Sports: ESPN: (NR)				
Overall recruit ranking:
Note: In many cases, Scout, Rivals, 247Sports, On3, and ESPN may conflict in their listings of height and weight.; In these cases, the average was taken. ESPN grades are on a 100-point scale.; Sources: "2023 Team Ranking". Rivals.

== Roster ==
2023–24 West Virginia Mountaineers men's basketball team
Players
Coaches

Pos.	#	Name	Height	Weight	Year	Previous school	Hometown
F	13	Akok Akok	6 ft 10 in (2.08 m)	225 lb (102 kg)	GS	Georgetown	Manchester, NH
G	21	RaeQuan Battle	6 ft 5 in (1.96 m)	195 lb (88 kg)	GS	Montana State	Tulalip Bay, WA
G	5	Jeremiah Bembry	6 ft 5 in (1.96 m)	185 lb (84 kg)	RS Fr	Florida State	Brooklyn, NY
C	7	Jesse Edwards	6 ft 11 in (2.11 m)	240 lb (109 kg)	GS	Syracuse	Amsterdam, Netherlands
G	1	Noah Farrakhan	6 ft 1 in (1.85 m)	170 lb (77 kg)	Sr	Eastern Michigan	Newark, NJ
F	22	Josiah Harris	6 ft 7 in (2.01 m)	215 lb (98 kg)	So	Richmond Heights HS	Canton, OH
G	2	Kobe Johnson	6 ft 3 in (1.91 m)	205 lb (93 kg)	Jr	Canton McKinley HS	Canton, OH
G	3	Kerr Kriisa	6 ft 3 in (1.91 m)	185 lb (84 kg)	Sr	Arizona	Tartu, Estonia
F	9	Ofri Naveh	6 ft 6 in (1.98 m)	185 lb (84 kg)	Fr	Maccabi Tel Aviv B.C.	Neot Golan, Israel
C	43	Ali Ragab (W)	7 ft 0 in (2.13 m)	275 lb (125 kg)	Jr	Gannon	Cairo, Egypt
F	11	Quinn Slazinski	6 ft 9 in (2.06 m)	230 lb (104 kg)	GS	Iona	Houston, TX
F	24	Patrick Suemnick	6 ft 8 in (2.03 m)	235 lb (107 kg)	Sr	Triton College	Green Bay, WI
G	4	Aden Tagaloa-Nelson (W)	6 ft 1 in (1.85 m)	197 lb (89 kg)	Fr	Woodford County HS	Lexington, KY
G	14	Seth Wilson	6 ft 2 in (1.88 m)	220 lb (100 kg)	Jr	Lorain HS	Lorain, OH

Head coach

- Josh Eilert (interim) (Kansas State)

Assistant coach(es)

- DerMarr Johnson (Cincinnati)
- Da'Sean Butler (West Virginia)
- Alex Ruoff (West Virginia)
- Jordan McCabe (UNLV)

Legend

- (C) Team captain
- (S) Suspended
- (I) Ineligible
- (W) Walk-on
- Injured
- Current redshirt

Roster

== Schedule and results ==
Date time, TV	Rank^{#}	Opponent^{#}	Result	Record	High points	High rebounds	High assists	Site (attendance) city, state
Exhibition
October 27, 2023*; 7:00 p.m., ESPN+		George Mason; Charity Exhibition	W 85–78	–	21 – Tied	9 – Harris	3 – Tied	WVU Coliseum (9,437); Morgantown, WV
Non-conference regular season
November 6, 2023*; 7:00 p.m., ESPN+		Missouri State	W 67–59	1–0	18 – Slazinski	13 – Edwards	4 – Johnson	WVU Coliseum (9,691); Morgantown, WV
November 10, 2023*; 7:00 p.m., ESPN+		Monmouth	L 65–73	1–1	16 – Edwards	13 – Edwards	4 – Slazinski	WVU Coliseum (10,473); Morgantown, WV
November 14, 2023*; 7:00 p.m., ESPN+		Jacksonville State	W 70–57	2–1	19 – Tied	7 – Slazinski	5 – Johnson	WVU Coliseum (9,218); Morgantown, WV
November 20, 2023*; 6:00 p.m., FS1		vs. SMU; Fort Myers Tip-Off semifinals	L 58–70	2–2	18 – Edwards	9 – Edwards	4 – Wilson	Suncoast Credit Union Arena (3,500); Fort Myers, FL
November 22, 2023*; 6:00 p.m., FS1		vs. No. 24 Virginia; Fort Myers Tip-Off consolation	L 54–56	2–3	17 – Tied	9 – Edwards	6 – Johnson	Suncoast Credit Union Arena (3,500); Fort Myers, FL
November 26, 2023*; 5:00 p.m., ESPN+		Bellarmine	W 62–58	3–3	17 – Edwards	14 – Edwards	3 – Slazinski	WVU Coliseum (9,181); Morgantown, WV
December 1, 2023*; 7:00 p.m., ESPN2		St. John's; Big East–Big 12 Battle	L 73–79	3–4	19 – Slazinski	8 – Harris	3 – Naveh	WVU Coliseum (10,781); Morgantown, WV
December 6, 2023*; 9:00 p.m., ESPN2		Pittsburgh; Backyard Brawl	L 63–80	3–5	22 – Slazinski	9 – Edwards	4 – Johnson	WVU Coliseum (12,301); Morgantown, WV
December 9, 2023*; 4:00 p.m., ESPN+		Drexel	W 66–60	4–5	16 – Edwards	6 – Slazinski	6 – Johnson	WVU Coliseum (9,414); Morgantown, WV
December 16, 2023*; 6:30 p.m., ESPNU		vs. UMass; Basketball Hall of Fame Classic	L 79–87	4–6	20 – Tied	6 – Harris	7 – Kriisa	MassMutual Center (4,264); Springfield, MA
December 20, 2023*; 7:00 p.m., ESPN+		Radford	L 65–66	4–7	29 – Battle	7 – Tied	6 – Kriisa	WVU Coliseum (9,019); Morgantown, WV
December 23, 2023*; 1:00 p.m., ESPN+		Toledo	W 91–81	5–7	29 – Battle	12 – Akok	10 – Kriisa	WVU Coliseum (10,693); Morgantown, WV
December 30, 2023*; 7:00 p.m., FOX		vs. Ohio State; Legends of Basketball Showcase	L 75–78 ^{OT}	5–8	24 – Battle	10 – Battle	4 – Kriisa	Rocket Mortgage FieldHouse (12,211); Cleveland, OH
Big 12 regular season
January 6, 2024; 2:00 p.m., ESPN+		at No. 3 Houston	L 55–89	5–9 (0–1)	12 – Suemnick	6 – Harris	3 – Harris	Fertitta Center (7,387); Houston, TX
January 9, 2024; 7:00 p.m., ESPN+		Kansas State	L 67–81	5–10 (0–2)	21 – Battle	4 – Suemnick	5 – Kriisa	WVU Coliseum (10,063); Morgantown, WV
January 13, 2024; 6:00 p.m., ESPN+		No. 25 Texas	W 76–73	6–10 (1–2)	16 – Suemnick	7 – Farrakhan	3 – Johnson	WVU Coliseum (11,565); Morgantown, WV
January 17, 2024; 8:00 p.m., ESPN+		at No. 15 Oklahoma	L 63–77	6–11 (1–3)	14 – Farrakhan	7 – Suemnick	4 – Kriisa	Lloyd Noble Center (6,835); Norman, OK
January 20, 2024; 4:00 p.m., ESPN+		No. 3 Kansas	W 91–85	7–11 (2–3)	23 – Battle	9 – Battle	6 – Farrakhan	WVU Coliseum (11,565); Morgantown, WV
January 23, 2024; 7:00 p.m., ESPN+		at UCF	L 59–72	7–12 (2–4)	15 – Harris	8 – Harris	5 – Kriisa	Addition Financial Arena (8,882); Orlando, FL
January 27, 2024; 2:00 p.m., ESPN+		at Oklahoma State	L 66–70	7–13 (2–5)	21 – Kriisa	7 – Farrakhan	5 – Johnson	Gallagher-Iba Arena (6,889); Stillwater, OK
January 31, 2024; 7:00 p.m., ESPN+		Cincinnati rivalry	W 69–65	8–13 (3–5)	25 – Edwards	10 – Edwards	7 – Kriisa	WVU Coliseum (10,349); Morgantown, WV
February 3, 2024; 6:00 p.m., ESPN+		No. 22 BYU	L 73–86	8–14 (3–6)	23 – Kriisa	7 – Edwards	4 – Kriisa	WVU Coliseum (11,753); Morgantown, WV
February 10, 2024; 3:00 p.m., LHN		at Texas	L 58–94	8–15 (3–7)	17 – Edwards	9 – Edwards	4 – Kriisa	Moody Center (10,073); Austin, TX
February 12, 2024; 8:00 p.m., ESPN+		at TCU	L 65–81	8–16 (3–8)	21 – Battle	5 – Tied	5 – Slazinski	Schollmaier Arena (5,694); Fort Worth, TX
February 17, 2024; 6:00 p.m., ESPN2		No. 12 Baylor	L 81–94	8–17 (3–9)	25 – Battle	9 – Edwards	6 – Kriisa	WVU Coliseum (12,558); Morgantown, WV
February 20, 2024; 7:00 p.m., ESPNU		UCF	W 77–67	9–17 (4–9)	24 – Battle	10 – Edwards	7 – Kriisa	WVU Coliseum (9,569); Morgantown, WV
February 24, 2024; 2:00 p.m., ESPN2		at No. 6 Iowa State	L 64–71	9–18 (4–10)	12 – Tied	8 – Edwards	3 – Tied	Hilton Coliseum (14,267); Ames, IA
February 26, 2024; 7:00 p.m., ESPN2		at Kansas State	L 90–94 ^{OT}	9–19 (4–11)	28 – Battle	7 – Edwards	6 – Kriisa	Bramlage Coliseum (8,813); Manhattan, KS
March 2, 2024; 6:00 p.m., ESPN2		Texas Tech	L 70–81	9–20 (4–12)	18 – Edwards	8 – Edwards	4 – Kriisa	WVU Coliseum (11,313); Morgantown, WV
March 6, 2024; 7:00 p.m., ESPN+		TCU	L 81–93	9–21 (4–13)	36 – Edwards	13 – Edwards	9 – Kriisa	WVU Coliseum (9,674); Morgantown, WV
March 9, 2024; 2:00 p.m., ESPN+		at Cincinnati rivalry	L 56–92	9–22 (4–14)	12 – Farrakhan	4 – Battle	4 – Slazinski	Fifth Third Arena (11,914); Cincinnati, OH
Big 12 tournament
March 12, 2024; 3:00 p.m., ESPN+	(14)	vs. (11) Cincinnati; First Round/rivalry	L 85–90	9–23	14 – Battle	7 – Slazinski	4 – Slazinski	T-Mobile Center (9,404); Kansas City, MO
*Non-conference game. ^{#}Rankings from AP Poll. (#) Tournament seedings in parentheses. All times are in Eastern Time.
