= 2024 Big 12 men's basketball tournament =

American college basketball competition

- Classification: Division I
- Season: 2023–24
- Teams: 14
- Site: T-Mobile Center; Kansas City, Missouri
- Champions: Iowa State (6th title)
- Winning coach: T. J. Otzelberger (1st title)
- MVP: Keshon Gilbert (Iowa State)
- Attendance: 118,300 (total); 19,135 (championship)
- Top scorer: Keshon Gilbert (48)
- Television: ESPN, ESPN2, ESPN+

2023–24 Big 12 men's basketball standings
| | Conf. | | | | Overall |
| Team | W | | L | PCT | W | | L | PCT |
|---|---|---|---|---|---|---|---|---|
| No. 3т Houston | 15 | – | 3 | .833 | 32 | – | 5 | .865 |
| No. 8 Iowa State † | 13 | – | 5 | .722 | 29 | – | 8 | .784 |
| No. 16 Baylor | 11 | – | 7 | .611 | 24 | – | 11 | .686 |
| Texas Tech | 11 | – | 7 | .611 | 23 | – | 11 | .676 |
| BYU | 10 | – | 8 | .556 | 23 | – | 11 | .676 |
| No. 19 Kansas | 10 | – | 8 | .556 | 23 | – | 11 | .676 |
| Texas | 9 | – | 9 | .500 | 21 | – | 13 | .618 |
| TCU | 9 | – | 9 | .500 | 21 | – | 13 | .618 |
| Oklahoma | 8 | – | 10 | .444 | 20 | – | 12 | .625 |
| Kansas State | 8 | – | 10 | .444 | 19 | – | 15 | .559 |
| Cincinnati | 7 | – | 11 | .389 | 22 | – | 15 | .595 |
| UCF | 7 | – | 11 | .389 | 17 | – | 16 | .515 |
| Oklahoma State | 4 | – | 14 | .222 | 12 | – | 20 | .375 |
| West Virginia | 4 | – | 14 | .222 | 9 | – | 23 | .281 |
† 2024 Big 12 tournament winner Rankings from AP poll

The 2024 Big 12 Men's Basketball Tournament was a postseason men's basketball tournament for the Big 12 Conference. It was played from March 12–16, 2024, in Kansas City, Missouri at T-Mobile Center. The winner received the conference's automatic bid to the 2024 NCAA Tournament. Due to a major conference realignment that significantly impacted the Big 12, it was the first and only tournament with 14 teams participating. At the beginning of the 2023–24 season, BYU, Cincinnati, Houston, and UCF joined the conference. It was the final appearance in the tournament for Texas and Oklahoma before leaving the conference. The tournament was sponsored by Phillips 66.

== Seeds ==
All fourteen teams participated in the tournament. It was the first and only tournament with the 14-team bracket format. The top ten teams received a first round bye and the top four teams received a double bye, automatically advancing them into the quarterfinals.

Teams were seeded by record within the conference. Ties were broken using a tiebreaker system, with the first tiebreaker being best record in head-to-head matchups then the 2nd tiebreaker being head-to-head record against each team in the conference beginning with the first place team and working down.

| Seed | School | Conference Record | Tiebreaker 1 | Tiebreaker 2 | Tiebreaker 3 |
|---|---|---|---|---|---|
| 1 | Houston | 15–3 | | | |
| 2 | Iowa State | 13–5 | | | |
| 3 | Baylor | 11–7 | 1–1 vs. Texas Tech | 0–1 vs. Houston | 1–0 vs. Iowa State |
| 4 | Texas Tech | 11–7 | 1–1 vs. Baylor | 0–1 vs. Houston | 0–1 vs. Iowa State |
| 5 | BYU | 10–8 | 1–0 vs. Kansas | | |
| 6 | Kansas | 10–8 | 0–1 vs. BYU | | |
| 7 | Texas | 9–9 | 1–0 vs. TCU | | |
| 8 | TCU | 9–9 | 0–1 vs. Texas | | |
| 9 | Oklahoma | 8–10 | 1–0 vs. Kansas State | | |
| 10 | Kansas State | 8–10 | 0–1 vs. Oklahoma | | |
| 11 | Cincinnati | 7–11 | 2–0 vs. UCF | | |
| 12 | UCF | 7–11 | 0–2 vs. Cincinnati | | |
| 13 | Oklahoma State | 4–14 | 1–0 vs. West Virginia | | |
| 14 | West Virginia | 4–14 | 0–1 vs. Oklahoma State | | |

== Schedule ==
| Game | Time* | Matchup^{#} | Final score | Television | Attendance |
First round – Tuesday, March 12
| 1 | 11:30 a.m. | No. 12 UCF vs No. 13 Oklahoma State | 77–62 | ESPN+ | 9,404 |
| 2 | 2:00 p.m. | No. 11 Cincinnati vs No. 14 West Virginia | 90–85 | ESPN+ | 9,404 |
Second round – Wednesday, March 13
| 3 | 11:30 a.m. | No. 5 BYU vs No. 12 UCF | 87–73 | ESPN2 | 16,044 |
| 4 | 2:00 p.m. | No. 8 TCU vs No. 9 Oklahoma | 77–70 | ESPN+ | 16,044 |
| 5 | 6:00 p.m. | No. 7 Texas vs No. 10 Kansas State | 74–78 | ESPN+ | 18,261 |
| 6 | 8:30 p.m. | No. 6 Kansas vs No. 11 Cincinnati | 52–72 | ESPN2 | 18,261 |
Quarterfinals – Thursday, March 14
| 7 | 11:30 a.m. | No. 4 Texas Tech vs No. 5 BYU | 81–67 | ESPN2 | 17,186 |
| 8 | 2:00 p.m. | No. 1 Houston vs No. 8 TCU | 60–45 | ESPN | 17,186 |
| 9 | 6:00 p.m. | No. 2 Iowa State vs No. 10 Kansas State | 76–57 | ESPN2 | 19,135 |
| 10 | 8:30 p.m. | No. 3 Baylor vs No. 11 Cincinnati | 68–56 | ESPN2 | 19,135 |
Semifinals – Friday, March 15
| 11 | 6:00 p.m. | No. 1 Houston vs No. 4 Texas Tech | 82–59 | ESPN2 | 19,135 |
| 12 | 8:30 p.m. | No. 2 Iowa State vs No. 3 Baylor | 76–62 | ESPN | 19,135 |
Championship – Saturday, March 16
| 13 | 5:00 p.m. | No. 1 Houston vs No. 2 Iowa State | 41–69 | ESPN | 19,135 |
*Game times in CDT. #-Rankings denote tournament seed

== Bracket ==
First round Tuesday, March 12; ESPN+
12 | UCF | 77
13 | Oklahoma State | 62
11 | Cincinnati | 90
14 | West Virginia | 85

Second round Wednesday, March 13; ESPN2/ESPN+
8 | TCU | 77
9 | Oklahoma | 70
5 | BYU | 87
12 | UCF | 73
7 | Texas | 74
10 | Kansas State | 78
6 | Kansas | 52
11 | Cincinnati | 72

Quarterfinals; Thursday, March 14; ESPN/ESPN2
1 | Houston | 60
8 | TCU | 45
4 | Texas Tech | 81
5 | BYU | 67
2 | Iowa State | 76
10 | Kansas State | 57
3 | Baylor | 68
11 | Cincinnati | 56

Semifinals; Friday, March 15; ESPN/ESPN2
1 | Houston | 82
4 | Texas Tech | 59
2 | Iowa State | 76
3 | Baylor | 62

Championship; Saturday, March 16; ESPN
1 | Houston | 41
2 | Iowa State | 69
