= Darrion Williams =

American basketball player (born 2003)

No. 5 – Texas Tech Red Raiders
- Position: Small forward
- Conference: Big 12 Conference

Personal information
- Born: April 23, 2003 (age 23)
- Listed height: 6 ft 6 in (1.98 m)
- Listed weight: 225 lb (102 kg)

Career information
- High school: Capital Christian (Sacramento, California); Bishop Gorman (Las Vegas, Nevada)
- College: Nevada (2022–2023); Texas Tech (2023–2025); NC State (2025–2026); Texas Tech (2026–present)

Career highlights
- First-team All-Big 12 (2025); Third-team All-Big 12 (2024); Big 12 All-Newcomer team (2024); Mountain West Freshman of the Year (2023)

Darrion Williams (born April 23, 2003) is an American college basketball player for the Texas Tech Red Raiders of the Big 12 Conference. He previously played for the Nevada Wolf Pack and NC State Wolfpack.

== Early life ==
Williams was born on April 23, 2003, growing up in Sacramento, California and initially attended Capital Christian School. After his sophomore year, he transferred to Bishop Gorman High School in Las Vegas, Nevada. Williams' junior season at Bishop Gorman was canceled due to COVID-19. As a senior, he was named the Nevada Gatorade Player of the Year. Williams was rated a three-star recruit and committed to play college basketball at the University of Nevada, Reno.

== College career ==
=== Nevada ===
Williams began his college career with the Nevada Wolf Pack. He averaged 7.7 points, 7.3 rebounds, 2.7 assists, and 1.4 steals per game and was named the Mountain West Conference Freshman of the Year. After the season, Williams entered the NCAA transfer portal.

=== Texas Tech ===
In April 2023, Williams first transferred to play for Texas Tech. He averaged 11.4 points, 7.5 rebounds, 2.5 assists, and 1.2 steals per game and was named third-team All-Big 12 Conference.

=== NC State ===
Williams entered the transfer portal and NBA draft on April 6, 2025, and withdrew from the NBA Draft on May 20. He committed to the North Carolina State Wolfpack on May 22.

=== Texas Tech (2nd stint) ===
On August 7, 2026, Williams transferred to Texas Tech for a second time. He was granted a temporary restraining order against the NCAA and as a result granted a fifth season of eligibility after filing a lawsuit in the state of Texas.
