= Josh Eilert =

American basketball coach (born 1980)

Current position
- Title: Assistant coach
- Team: Wichita State
- Conference: American

Biographical details
- Born: December 2, 1980 (age 45); Beloit, Kansas, U.S.
- Education: Kansas State University (2004)

Playing career
- 2000–2002: Cloud County
- 2002–2004: Kansas State
- Position: Forward

Coaching career (HC unless noted)
- 2005–2007: Kansas State (GA)
- 2022–2023: West Virginia (assistant)
- 2023–2024: West Virginia (interim HC)
- 2024–2025: Utah (assistant)
- 2025: Utah (interim HC)
- 2025–present: Wichita State (assistant)

Administrative career (AD unless noted)
- 2007–2013: West Virginia (video coordinator)
- 2013–2022: West Virginia (DBO)
- 2022: West Virginia (assistant A.D. for basketball operations)

Head coaching record
- Overall: 10–28 (.263)

Josh Eilert (born December 2, 1980) is an American college basketball coach who is currently an assistant coach for the Wichita State Shockers of the American Conference. He has previously served as the interim head coach of the West Virginia Mountaineers and the Utah Utes of the Big 12 Conference.

== Playing career ==
Eilert started his playing career at Cloud County Community College where he earned academic All-America honors as a sophomore, where he also averaged six points and five rebounds. Eilert would then walk on to Kansas State University. In his time with Kansas State, Eilert played in eight games, where he totalled two points, four rebounds, and a block.

== Coaching career ==
Eilert started his coaching career at Kansas State where he was a graduate assistant for three years. He next worked for the West Virginia University Mountaineers, where he held multiple different positions over a period of fifteen years.

In 2022, West Virginia promoted Eilert to assistant coach, and on June 24, 2023, he was promoted to be the Mountaineers' interim head coach after former coach Bob Huggins resigned. After finishing the season 9–23, Eilert was not retained as head coach.

On June 6, 2024, Eilert was hired as an assistant coach under Craig Smith at Utah. On February 24, 2025, Smith was relieved of his duties as head coach and Eilert was named interim head coach for the remainder of the 2024–25 season.

After concluding the 2024-25 season with a 1-5 record, Eilert was not retained by Utah. In May 2025, he was hired as an assistant coach at Wichita State University, joining head coach Paul Mills' staff.

== Head coaching record ==
Record table
Season	Team	Overall	Conference	Standing	Postseason
West Virginia Mountaineers (Big 12 Conference) (2023–2024)
2023–24	West Virginia	9–23	4–14	T–13th	
West Virginia:		9–23 (.281)	4–14 (.222)		
Utah Utes (Big 12 Conference) (2025)
2024–25	Utah	1–5	1–3	11th	CBC First Round
Utah:		1–5 (.167)	1–3 (.250)		
Total:		10–28 (.263)			
