= Tylor Perry =

American basketball player (born 2001)

Seattle SuperHawks
- Position: Point guard
- League: United States Basketball League

Personal information
- Born: January 17, 2001 (age 25) Fort Coffee, Oklahoma, U.S.
- Listed height: 5 ft 11 in (1.80 m)
- Listed weight: 180 lb (82 kg)

Career information
- High school: Spiro (Spiro, Oklahoma)
- College: Coffeyville CC (2019–2021); North Texas (2021–2023); Kansas State (2023–2024)
- NBA draft: 2024: undrafted
- Playing career: 2024–present

Career history
- 2024–2026: Raptors 905
- 2026–present: Seattle SuperHawks

Career highlights
- NIT champion (2023); NIT MVP (2023); Conference USA Player of the Year (2023); 2× First-team All-Conference USA (2022, 2023); Conference USA Sixth Man of the Year (2022)

Tylor Timar Perry (born January 17, 2001) is an American professional basketball player for the Seattle SuperHawks of the United States Basketball League. He played college basketball for the Coffeyville Red Ravens, North Texas Mean Green and Kansas State Wildcats.

== Early life and high school ==
As a child, Tylor Perry attended Moffett Public Schools. For his high school life, he grew up in Spiro, Oklahoma, and attended Spiro High School. He averaged 25 points per game as a senior and was named to the Oklahoma 3A All-State team. Perry originally committed to attend Central Missouri, a Division II institution, before his parents persuaded him to enroll at Coffeyville Community College.

== College career ==
As a freshman at Coffeyville, Perry averaged 11.8 points per game. Perry averaged 17.6 points per game as a sophomore and led the Red Ravens to the junior college national title. He was a first-team selection on the NJCAA All-Region VI team. Perry committed to continue his college career at North Texas.

As a junior, Perry averaged 13.5 points, 2.9 rebounds and 2.5 assists per game. He scored a career-high 35 points on November 25, 2022, in a 69-54 win over San Jose State. Perry averaged 17.3 points, 3.4 rebounds and 2.1 assists per game as a senior, while also shooting 43.7 percent from the floor. Perry earned Conference USA Player of the Year honors and led North Texas to the NIT championship, receiving MVP accolades.

Following the season, Perry transferred to Kansas State, choosing the Wildcats over Texas Tech, Florida and Ole Miss. He averaged 15.3 points, three rebounds and 4.3 assists per game. Perry was named All-Big 12 Honorable Mention and was selected to the NABC-Reese’s College All-Star Game.

== Professional career ==
Perry went undrafted in the 2024 NBA draft but was signed by the Toronto Raptors to an Exhibit 10 deal. On October 26, 2024, Perry joined Raptors 905 after being selected in the 2024 NBA G League draft. In 2026, he joined the Seattle SuperHawks of the United States Basketball League.
