= Clemson Tigers men's basketball statistical leaders =

The Clemson Tigers men's basketball statistical leaders are individual statistical leaders of the Clemson Tigers men's basketball program in various categories, including points, rebounds, assists, steals, and blocks. Within those areas, the lists identify single-game, single-season, and career leaders. The Tigers represent Clemson University in the NCAA's Atlantic Coast Conference.

Clemson began competing in intercollegiate basketball in 1911. However, the school's record book does not generally list records from before the 1950s, as records from before this period are often incomplete and inconsistent. Since scoring was much lower in this era, and teams played much fewer games during a typical season, it is likely that few or no players from this era would appear on these lists anyway.

The NCAA did not officially record assists as a stat until the 1983–84 season, and blocks and steals until the 1985–86 season, but Clemson's record books includes players in these stats before these seasons. These lists are updated through the end of the 2020–21 season.

== Scoring ==
Career
Rk	Player	Points	Seasons
1	Elden Campbell	1880	1986–87 1987–88 1988–89 1989–90
2	Terrell McIntyre	1839	1995–96 1996–97 1997–98 1998–99
3	Chase Hunter	1789	2019–20 2020–21 2021–22 2022–23 2023–24 2024–25
4	Butch Zatezalo	1761	1967–68 1968–69 1969–70
5	Greg Buckner	1754	1994–95 1995–96 1996–97 1997–98
6	Jaron Blossomgame	1733	2013–14 2014–15 2015–16 2016–17
7	Trevor Booker	1725	2006–07 2007–08 2008–09 2009–10
8	PJ Hall	1702	2020–21 2021–22 2022–23 2023–24
9	Horace Grant	1696	1983–84 1984–85 1985–86 1986–87
10	K.C. Rivers	1684	2005–06 2006–07 2007–08 2008–09

Season
Rk	Player	Points	Season
1	PJ Hall	659	2023–24
2	Bill Yarborough	651	1954–55
	Horace Grant	651	1986–87
4	Butch Zatezalo	645	1968–69
5	Terrell McIntyre	627	1998–99
	Will Solomon	627	1999–00
7	K.J. McDaniels	614	2013–14
8	Marcquise Reed	602	2018–19
9	Will Solomon	591	2000–01
10	Jaron Blossomgame	584	2016–17

Single game
Rk	Player	Points	Season	Opponent
1	James Erwin	58	1911–12	Butler Guards
2	J.W. Stribling	50	1915–16	Erskine
3	Bill Yarborough	46	1954–55	South Carolina
	Butch Zatezalo	46	1968–69	Wake Forest
5	Butch Zatezalo	43	1969–70	NC State
	Will Solomon	43	1999–00	Virginia
7	Will Solomon	41	2000–01	Georgia Tech
8	Bill Yarborough	40	1954–55	Virginia
9	Choppy Patterson	39	1960–61	The Citadel
10	Bill Yarborough	38	1955–56	Duke
	Butch Zatezalo	38	1968–69	Wake Forest
	Skip Wise	38	1974–75	Pennsylvania

== Rebounds ==
Career
Rk	Player	Rebounds	Seasons
1	Tree Rollins	1311	1973–74 1974–75 1975–76 1976–77
2	Dale Davis	1216	1987–88 1988–89 1989–90 1990–91
3	Trevor Booker	1060	2006–07 2007–08 2008–09 2009–10
4	Horace Grant	981	1983–84 1984–85 1985–86 1986–87
5	Harold Jamison	937	1995–96 1996–97 1997–98 1998–99
6	Sharone Wright	903	1991–92 1992–93 1993–94
7	Ian Schieffelin	884	2021–22 2022–23 2023–24 2024–25
8	Elden Campbell	836	1986–87 1987–88 1988–89 1989–90
9	Jaron Blossomgame	831	2013–14 2014–15 2015–16 2016–17
10	Larry Nance	784	1977–78 1978–79 1979–80 1980–81

Season
Rk	Player	Rebounds	Season
1	Dale Davis	395	1989–90
2	Sharone Wright	362	1993–94
3	Tree Rollins	359	1976–77
4	Horace Grant	357	1985–86
5	Harold Jamison	346	1998–99
6	Dale Davis	340	1990–91
	Ian Schieffelin	340	2023–24
8	Tree Rollins	328	1974–75
9	Ron Richardson	327	1951–52
10	Hunter Tyson	325	2022–23

Single game
Rk	Player	Rebounds	Season	Opponent
1	Tommy Smith	30	1954–55	Georgia
2	Donnie Mahaffey	25	1962–63	Georgia
3	Donnie Mahaffey	24	1962–63	The Citadel
	Tree Rollins	24	1973–74	Delaware
5	Tree Rollins	23	1976–77	Tennessee Tech
	Tree Rollins	23	1976–77	Maryland
7	David Angel	22	1971–72	Auburn
	Tree Rollins	22	1975–76	Harvard
	Tree Rollins	22	1975–76	Baptist
10	Earle Maxwell	21	1960–61	North Carolina
	David Angel	21	1972–73	Virginia
	Dale Davis	21	1988–89	North Carolina
	Dale Davis	21	1990–91	SC State

== Assists ==
Career
Rk	Player	Assists	Seasons
1	Grayson Marshall	857	1984–85 1985–86 1986–87 1987–88
2	Edward Scott	595	1999–00 2000–01 2001–02 2002–03
3	Terrell McIntyre	577	1995–96 1996–97 1997–98 1998–99
4	Derrick Johnson	476	1975–76 1976–77 1977–78 1978–79
5	Cliff Hammonds	473	2004–05 2005–06 2006–07 2007–08
6	Chase Hunter	435	2019–20 2020–21 2021–22 2022–23 2023–24 2024–25
7	Demontez Stitt	419	2007–08 2008–09 2009–10 2010–11
8	Bobby Conrad	402	1976–77 1977–78 1978–79 1979–80
9	Vernon Hamilton	399	2003–04 2004–05 2005–06 2006–07
10	Rod Hall	393	2011–12 2012–13 2013–14 2014–15

Season
Rk	Player	Assists	Season
1	Grayson Marshall	262	1985–86
2	Edward Scott	238	2001–02
3	Grayson Marshall	221	1986–87
4	Chris Whitney	193	1992–93
5	Grayson Marshall	192	1984–85
6	Terrell McIntyre	188	1998–99
7	Chris Dodds	187	1980–81
8	Grayson Marshall	182	1986–87
	Lou Richie	182	1993–94
10	Marion Cash	174	1989–90

Single game
Rk	Player	Assists	Season	Opponent
1	Grayson Marshall	20	1985–86	Maryland-Eastern Shore
2	Derrick Johnson	18	1976–77	Boston College
3	Derrick Johnson	16	1976–77	Buffalo
	Edward Scott	16	2001–02	Wake Forest
5	Mike Eppley	15	1982–83	Saint Francis (N.Y.)
6	Chris Whitney	14	1992–93	Liberty
	Edward Scott	14	2001–02	Charleston Southern
8	Grayson Marshall	13	1985–86	Middle Tennessee
	Lou Richie	13	1993–94	Florida State
	Lou Richie	13	1993–94	Southern Mississippi
	Edward Scott	13	2001–02	NC State

== Steals ==
Career
Rk	Player	Steals	Seasons
1	Vernon Hamilton	271	2003–04 2004–05 2005–06 2006–07
2	Cliff Hammonds	225	2004–05 2005–06 2006–07 2007–08
3	K.C. Rivers	210	2005–06 2006–07 2007–08 2008–09
4	Terrell McIntyre	194	1995–96 1996–97 1997–98 1998–99
5	Grayson Marshall	189	1984–85 1985–86 1986–87 1987–88
6	Derrick Johnson	188	1975–76 1976–77 1977–78 1978–79
7	Andre Young	184	2008–09 2009–10 2010–11 2011–12
8	Greg Buckner	179	1994–95 1995–96 1996–97 1997–98
9	Marcquise Reed	170	2016–17 2017–18 2018–19
10	James Mays	166	2004–05 2005–06 2006–07 2007–08

Season
Rk	Player	Steals	Season
1	Vernon Hamilton	83	2005–06
2	Chris Whitney	73	1992–93
3	Vernon Hamilton	70	2006–07
	Jaeden Zackery	70	2024–25
5	James Mays	69	2006–07
6	Vernon Hamilton	68	2004–05
7	Cliff Hammonds	66	2007–08
	Marcquise Reed	66	2018–19
9	K.C. Rivers	64	2007–08
10	Greg Buckner	63	1994–95

Single game
Rk	Player	Steals	Season	Opponent
1	Stan Rome	7	1976–77	Maryland
	Devin Gray	7	1992–93	The Citadel
	Terrell McIntyre	7	1997–98	Georgia Tech
	K.C. Rivers	7	2008–09	Duke
	Andre Young	7	2009–10	Maryland
6	Stan Rome	6	1977–78	Maryland
	Fred Gilliam	6	1979–80	Maryland
	Mike Eppley	6	1982–83	South Carolina
	Michael Tait	6	1986–87	Maryland
	Marion Cash	6	1989–90	Villanova
	David Young	6	1990–91	Furman
	Corey Wallace	6	1992–93	Howard
	Lou Richie	6	1993–94	Florida State
	Iker Iturbe	6	1994–95	NC State
	Greg Buckner	6	1997–98	Maryland
	Edward Scott	6	1999–00	Duke
	Vernon Hamilton	6	2004–05	UNC Asheville
	Cheyenne Moore	6	2004–05	Georgia Tech
	Vernon Hamilton	6	2005–06	Wofford
	Vernon Hamilton	6	2006–07	North Carolina
	James Mays	6	2007–08	Furman
	K.C. Rivers	6	2007–08	North Carolina
	Avry Holmes	6	2015–16	Georgia Tech
	Dillon Hunter	6	2024–25	Stanford

== Blocks ==
Career
Rk	Player	Blocks	Seasons
1	Tree Rollins	450	1973–74 1974–75 1975–76 1976–77
2	Elden Campbell	334	1986–87 1987–88 1988–89 1989–90
3	Sharone Wright	286	1991–92 1992–93 1993–94
4	Trevor Booker	249	2006–07 2007–08 2008–09 2009–10
5	Landry Nnoko	212	2012–13 2013–14 2014–15 2015–16
6	Dale Davis	210	1987–88 1988–89 1989–90 1990–91
7	Jerai Grant	197	2007–08 2008–09 2009–10 2010–11
8	Elijah Thomas	181	2016–17 2017–18 2018–19
9	K.J. McDaniels	177	2011–12 2012–13 2013–14
	Sharrod Ford	177	2001–02 2002–03 2003–04 2004–05

Season
Rk	Player	Blocks	Season
1	Sharone Wright	124	1992–93
2	Tree Rollins	119	1974–75
3	Tree Rollins	117	1975–76
4	Tree Rollins	108	1976–77
5	Tree Rollins	106	1973–74
6	K.J. McDaniels	100	2013–14
7	Sharone Wright	99	1993–94
8	Elden Campbell	97	1989–90
9	Elden Campbell	88	1987–88
10	Elden Campbell	87	1988–89

Single game
Rk	Player	Blocks	Season	Opponent
1	Tree Rollins	10	1975–76	Presbyterian
	Tree Rollins	10	1976–77	Jacksonville
	Tree Rollins	10	1976–77	Duke
	Sharone Wright	10	1992–93	UNC Greensboro
	Sharone Wright	10	1992–93	Maryland
6	Tree Rollins	9	1973–74	Saint John’s
	Tree Rollins	9	1974–75	Maryland
	Sharrod Ford	9	2004–05	Maryland
9	Tree Rollins	8	1973–74	Virginia
	Tree Rollins	8	1973–74	Furman
	Tree Rollins	8	1973–74	Furman
	Tree Rollins	8	1974–75	Virginia
	Tree Rollins	8	1974–75	NC State
	Tree Rollins	8	1976–77	North Carolina
	Tree Rollins	8	1976–77	North Carolina
	Elden Campbell	8	1986–87	Florida International
	Elden Campbell	8	1989–90	Radford
	Sharone Wright	8	1991–92	Maryland
	Sharone Wright	8	1993–94	Duke
	Sharrod Ford	8	2003–04	East Tennessee State
	Trevor Booker	8	2006–07	North Carolina
	Jerai Grant	8	2010–11	East Carolina
	Landry Nnoko	8	2015–16	Virginia Tech
