= Devin Gray =

Devin Gray may refer to:

- Devin Gray (basketball)
- Devin Gray (American football)
