= Clemson Tigers men's basketball =

Men's basketball team of Clemson University

Clemson Tigers
2026–27 Clemson Tigers men's basketball team
- University: Clemson University
- First season: 1911–12; 115 years ago
- Athletic director: Graham Neff
- Head coach: Brad Brownell; 17th season, 316–207 (.604)
- Location: Clemson, South Carolina
- Arena: Littlejohn Coliseum (capacity: 9,000)
- NCAA division: Division I
- Conference: ACC
- Nickname: Tigers
- Colors: Orange and regalia
- All-time record: 1,478–1,383–2 (.517)
- NCAA tournament record: 14–15 (.483)

NCAA Division I tournament Elite Eight
- 1980, 2024
Other NCAA Division I tournament results
Sweet Sixteen	1980, 1990*, 1997, 2018, 2024
Appearances	1980, 1987, 1989, 1990*, 1996, 1997, 1998, 2008, 2009, 2010, 2011, 2018, 2021, 2024, 2025, 2026

Conference tournament champions
- SoCon: 1939

Conference regular-season champions
- ACC: 1990

Uniforms
Home	Away	Alternate
- * vacated by NCAA

The Clemson Tigers men's basketball team is a college basketball program that represents Clemson University and competes in the NCAA Division I. Clemson is a founding member of the Atlantic Coast Conference.

Clemson sponsored its first men's basketball team in 1911–12, winning its first conference championship in 1939 and the ACC regular season in 1990. The Tigers have never won the ACC basketball tournament since its inception in 1953. The Tigers have reached the NCAA tournament 15 times in the modern era (1980, 1987, 1989, 1990, 1996, 1997, 1998, 2008, 2009, 2010, 2011, 2018, 2021, 2024, 2025) since the tournament expansion in 1980, advancing to the NCAA Sweet 16 five times (1980, 1990, 1997, 2018, 2024), with their best performance reaching the Elite Eight twice in 1980 and 2024.

Clemson's home court is Littlejohn Coliseum. It has been the scene of 55 Clemson wins over ranked teams (23 in the Top 10) since 1968, including a victory over #1 Duke in 1980, a 75–65 victory over #1 North Carolina in 2001, and a 74–47 victory over #3 Duke in 2009. The Clemson basketball programs have won roughly 75% of their games in Littlejohn, making it one of the ACC's toughest road venues.

Clemson's current head coach is Brad Brownell.

== Team history ==
Clemson's basketball history had an unusual beginning. The Tigers' first two basketball games were both played in Greenville, South Carolina on February 9, 1912, a 46–12 win at Furman, followed by a 78–6 victory over the Butler Guards later that evening. Brothers John and Frank Erwin scored a combined 74 points in their second game; John Erwin's 58 points still stand as Clemson's single-game scoring record, unique in college basketball for not being broken in over a century since the program's inaugural day. Clemson won its first seven games in the program's history, the longest streak to open a program among the current 15 ACC schools. Former Pittsburgh Nationals player Frank Dobson was Clemson's first basketball coach, taking the Tigers to a 13–5 record in the first two seasons.

=== Southern Conference ===
The Tigers began play in the Southern Conference in 1921, and 1922–23 had an 11–6 finish. Josh Cody coached for five seasons, the longest tenure for a Clemson Basketball coach in the first 25 years. In 1928–29, the Tigers won 15 games, a school record, and then followed that with a 16–9 mark. Cody pulled off the first huge upset in Clemson basketball history when the Tigers defeated Adolph Rupp's 10–1 Kentucky Wildcats, 29–26, at Clemson on Valentine's Day in 1931. From 1931 to 1940, Joe Davis coached Clemson to 101 victories, including 44 wins on the road. Davis still has the best winning percentage in Clemson history on the road and led the Tigers to a 15–3 (.833) mark in 1934–35. In the 1938–39 season, the Tigers won 10 of their last 11 games to close the regular season. Banks McFadden, eventual All-American in both football and basketball, averaged 11.8 points per game to lead the team as the starting pivot to four victories. It was an incredible run in the tournament as Clemson beat North Carolina, 44–43, Wake Forest, 30–28, Davidson 49–33 and Maryland 39–27 to clinch the Southern Conference title. McFadden's best year as coach was the 1951–52 season when the Tigers were 17–7 overall and 11–4 in the Conference.

=== Atlantic Coast Conference ===
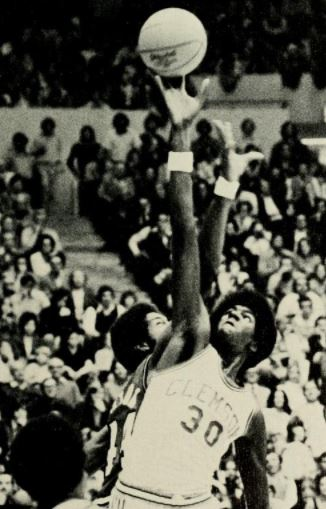
Center Tree Rollins, Clemson keyplayer in the 1970s

In 1953, Clemson became a founding member of the Atlantic Coast Conference. In the 1954–55 season, Bill Yarborough averaged 28.3 points per game, 4th best in the nation and best in the ACC. In 1958, Vince Yockel became the first Clemson player to make first-team All-ACC. Press Maravich, father of basketball legend Pete Maravich, coached the Tigers to a 96–94 double overtime victory against a #8 NC State team. Jim Brennan became the first Clemson player to make the first-team All-ACC Tournament in 1962 with 34 points against #8 Duke in the semifinals before losing to Billy Packer and the Wake Forest Demon Deacons, 77–66. In 1963–64, coach Bobby Roberts guided the Tigers to an 8–6 record in the ACC. The season included the only regular season sweep of North Carolina in school history. Roberts beat the Tar Heels and Dean Smith, 66–64, in double overtime at Clemson to open the season and beat them again, 97–90, in double overtime in Charlotte at the North–South Doubleheader. In 1966–67. Clemson won seven straight ACC games, including consecutive wins over Wake Forest, #14 Duke, North Carolina State and #4 North Carolina. It was the first sweep of "the North Carolina ACC schools" in ACC history. Clemson finished with a 17–8 record and a 9–5 record in the ACC. Randy Mahaffey was a first-team All-ACC selection who became Clemson's first professional player. His teammate Jim Sutherland averaged 17 points a game and was the first Clemson athlete in any sport to win the Jim Weaver Award as the ACC's top scholar-athlete.

In the 1970s, Tree Rollins ushered in a new era in Clemson basketball when he matriculated to Tigertown for the 1973–74 season. He changed the image of Clemson basketball more than any other player. At 7–2, he was a shot-blocking phenomenon who burst on the national scene in his second game when he had 22 points, 20 rebounds and nine blocked shots against St. John's. Rollins started 110 games in a row, which was a national record then. His sophomore year, 1974–75, he joined forces with Skip Wise to take Clemson to its first top 20 final ranking and its first postseason NIT tournament bid. The Tigers defeated 3rd ranked Maryland, 10th ranked North Carolina and 4th ranked NC State at home. Wise was named first-team All-ACC and the first true freshman in league history to obtain that honor.

==== Bill Foster ====
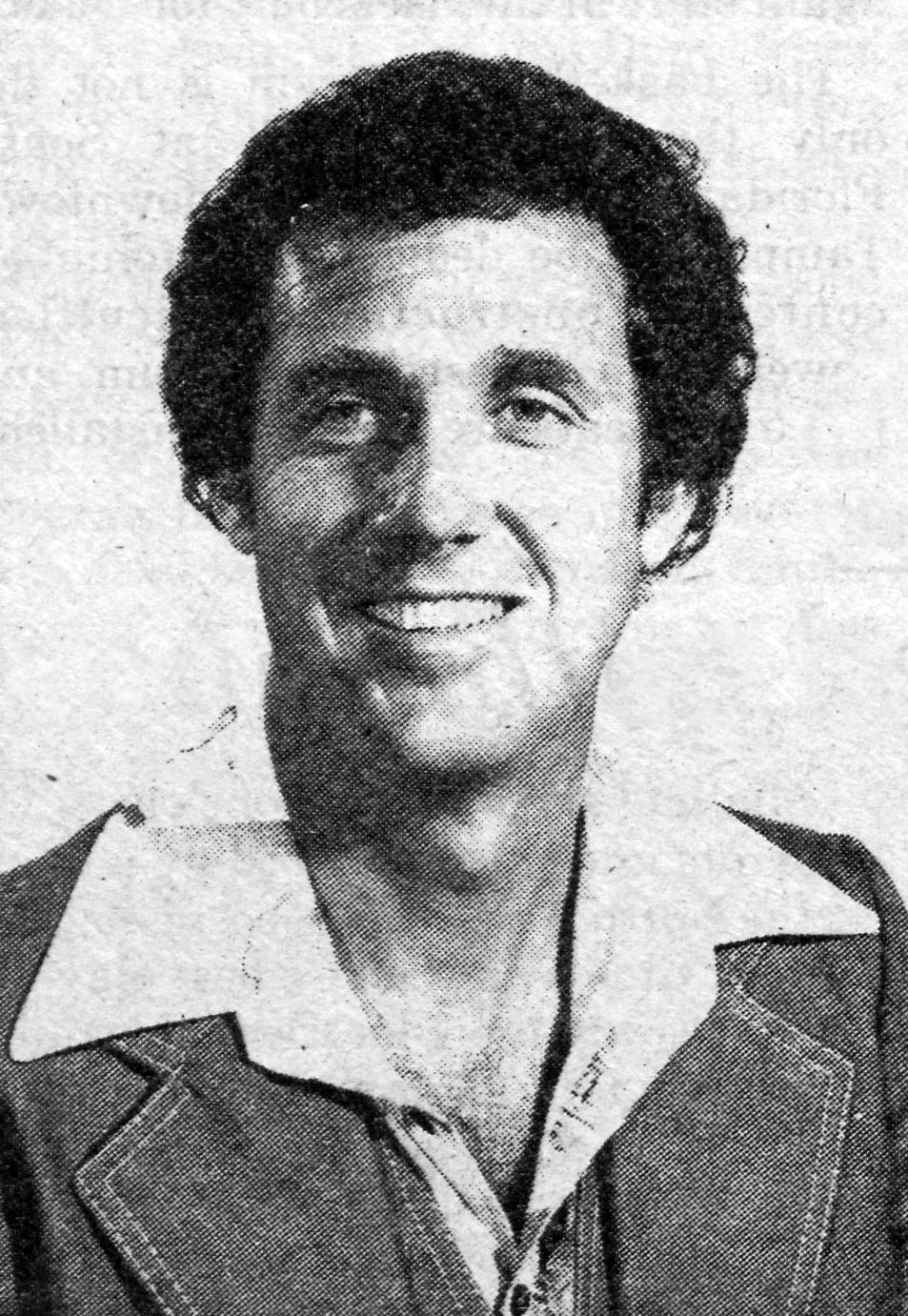
Bill Foster

In 1975, Bill Foster was brought in to build the program further. He had an impeccable reputation and came from a UNC Charlotte program he helped advance. When Tree Rollins decided not to turn professional, Foster coached the Tigers to a 22–6 record, the program's ninth straight year with an improved winning percentage. Before his final game, Rollins had his #30 jersey retired, the first athlete in Clemson history so honored. It was a fitting way to honor Rollins, who averaged a double-double for four years and is still first in ACC history in blocked shots, before starting his 18-year career in the NBA. Bill Foster did a remarkable job in keeping Clemson at a winning level. He won 100 games in his first 147, still fifth in ACC history in terms of the fewest games required to get 100 wins. He could find diamonds in the rough that kept Clemson competitive in the ACC: Bobby Conrad, Horace Grant, Harvey Grant, & Larry Nance an eventual All-West regional choice in the 1980 NCAA tournament and NBA All-Star. Foster's 1979–80 team defeated six top 20 teams during the year, including #1 ranked Duke on January 9, 1980, in overtime, 87–82. Clemson went to the NCAA Tournament defeating Danny Ainge and BYU in Round 2 before being eliminated by Larry Brown and UCLA in the Elite Eight.

==== Cliff Ellis ====
Cliff Ellis became the winningest coach in Clemson basketball history on a total victories basis (177–128). He took the Tigers to eight post-season tournaments, including three NCAA tournaments. He coached a record 25-win season in 1987, with ACC Player of the Year and future NBA champion Horace Grant. Ellis coached Clemson to the ACC regular season title in 1990, with the Tigers posting a 24–8 record that year behind Dale Davis and Elden Campbell, ending in a last-second shot by UConn in the Sweet 16. Ellis set 33 Clemson coaching records, including ACC regular season victories, victories at home and home winning percentage. The Tigers won 22 games over the top 25 teams in Ellis' ten years at Clemson, including an upset of 12th-ranked Florida State in the 1993 ACC Tournament and a victory over #2 North Carolina in 1994. Ellis was also named ACC Coach-of-the-Year in 1987 and 1990, the only Clemson coach to win that award.

==== Rick Barnes ====
Rick Barnes was the first coach in Clemson history to take the Tigers to the NCAA Tournament three consecutive years. Barnes coached Clemson into post-season play every year of his tenure and to the NCAA in 1996, 1997, and 1998. The Tigers' top season was his third year, when he coached the Tigers to a 16–1 start and a #2 national ranking. In the season, he opened with a 79–71 overtime victory against defending National Champion Kentucky. The team ended the season 23–10 and ranked #8 in the final USA Today poll. Picked last in the ACC before his first season, he shocked the basketball world by winning his first ten games, including a 75–70 victory over 9th-ranked Duke in Cameron Indoor Stadium. In his second season, he featured an 18–11 record, including Clemson's first-ever ACC Tournament victory over #20 North Carolina. The Tigers were ranked fifth in the nation in the preseason poll of 1997–1998, an example of the level of respect that Barnes had brought back to the program. His fiery on-the-floor interactions with Dean Smith and the teams' physical style of play made him a basketball fan favorite. Clemson defeated three top-25 teams in 1997–1998, including sixth-ranked South Carolina. Barnes concluded his four years with a 74–48 record, a 60.7 percent winning mark before leaving for the University of Texas.

==== Larry Shyatt ====
Barnes' assistant Larry Shyatt, who was a part of Clemson's success in the three seasons prior, took over as head coach for five seasons from 1998 to 2003. Shyatt led the Tigers to a 20-win season in his first season (20–15). The Tigers advanced to the 1999 NIT Championship Game before losing to California by one point, 60–61. At the time, Shyatt became only the fourth first-year coach in Atlantic Coast Conference (ACC) history to guide his team to a 20-win season. Also during his time as head coach at Clemson, the 2000–01 team set a school record for three-point field goals in a season and recorded one of the biggest wins in school history with a 75–65 win over No. 1 ranked North Carolina on February 18, 2001, ending an 18-game winning streak for the Tar Heels.

==== Oliver Purnell ====
After several lackluster seasons and renovations to Littlejohn Coliseum, Oliver Purnell rebuilt the program steadily, improving each subsequent season. The trademark of Purnell's teams was full-court pressure defense. In 2008, he guided the Tigers to a third-place 10–6 record in the Atlantic Coast Conference and a runner-up position in the ACC Tournament in Charlotte, losing to North Carolina by 5 points. The 2008–09 season was record-breaking on many fronts. Purnell's team finished with a 23–9 record, a .719 winning percentage, and a No. 24 final ranking in the Associated Press poll. Clemson's victims that season were #3 Duke, who lost to the #10 Tigers by a score of 74–47 at Littlejohn Coliseum. It was the largest margin of victory ever for Clemson against a ranked opponent. Coaching players such as Cliff Hammonds, K.C. Rivers, and Trevor Booker, Purnell finished with a record of 138–88 and guided the Tigers to 3 NCAA appearances.

==== Brad Brownell ====
Brad Brownell is the current Clemson head basketball coach. In his first season in 2010, Brownell guided the Tigers to a 4th-place ACC finish and a 2nd-round finish in the NCAA Tournament and set a record with 22 wins (9 ACC), the most ever by a rookie coach. Jerai Grant and Demontez Stitt became the first scholarship players in school history to be consistent contributors to four straight NCAA Tournament teams. Brownell's second team went 16–15 and 8–8 in ACC play, a record fifth straight season the Tigers were .500 or better in conference games, defeating three teams that advanced to the NCAA Tournament, including NC State. In 2013, the Tigers suffered a 13–18 overall record. Still, they were impressive in several statistical categories, yielding just 60.1 points per game, finishing 2nd in the ACC in Scoring Defense, and setting a record for fewest turnovers. Brownell's defensive style continued to stifle teams into the 2014 season, as the Tigers, led by blocking and scoring leader K. J. McDaniels, was ranked 2nd in the nation in Scoring Defense (56.8 ppg), which helped elevate Clemson to a 72–59 upset of #16 Duke on January 11. The Tigers were seeded 6th in the 2014 ACC tournament and advanced to the semifinals of the NIT at Madison Square Garden. On January 16, 2016, the Clemson Tigers defeated #8 Miami, marking the first time Clemson has defeated three consecutive top-25 opponents. In the two games prior, Clemson defeated #16 Louisville and #9 Duke. Brownell was announced after the 2016–2017 season to stay as Clemson's head coach with a contract extension until 2021.

In 2017–18 the Tigers went 25-10 (9-9) and Brownell and the Tigers made their first appearance in the NCAA tournament since 2010–11. Clemson would beat #12 seed New Mexico State 79–68 and #4 seed Auburn 84–53 before losing to #1 seeded Kansas 80–76. In the 2019–20 season, the Tigers beat #3 Duke at home and North Carolina back to back and won in Chapel Hill for the first time. The Tigers also beat #5 Louisville and #6 Florida State, finished with a 16–15 (9–11) record, and finished 9th in the ACC.

The 2023–2024 season proved to be one of the most successful seasons in Clemson history. Led by All-ACC selection PJ Hall and senior guard Chase Hunter, the team boasted ranked non-conference wins over in-state rival South Carolina and Alabama, the latter coming in the ACC—SEC Challenge. Clemson also achieved their second-ever win in Chapel Hill over #3 UNC, the second highest-ranked road win in history for the Tigers, second only to Clemson's win over #2 Maryland in 1976. The Tigers earned a 6 seed in the ACC tournament, only to fall in their first game to 12 seed Boston College. The Tigers were selected for their first NCAA tournament appearance since 2021, as a 6 seed. Rebounding from their disappointing ACC tournament finish, the Tigers earned their first Elite Eight appearance since 1980, beating three favored teams in 11 seed New Mexico, 3 seed Baylor, and 2 seed Arizona before falling to 4-seed Alabama in the Elite Eight. Clemson's 2024 Elite Eight finish is Brownell's best as a head coach, and Clemson's best finish since the tournament expanded to 64 teams in 1985.

The 2024–25 season was another very successful season for the Tigers. The team was led by senior guard Chase Hunter and senior forward Ian Schieffelin. The team posted an early season non-conference upset of the #4 ranked Kentucky Wildcats during the ACC/SEC Challenge, defeating them 70–66. Clemson would post an 18–2 (.900) ACC regular season record, the best in its history, featuring wins over North Carolina 85–65 and #2 Duke 77–71 matching their highest ranked opponent to ever be defeated with the only other instance coming against #2 Maryland in 1976. Clemson earned the 3 seed in the 2025 ACC Tournament where they defeated SMU in the quarterfinals 57–54 but ultimately being eliminated in the semifinals falling to Louisville 76-73. The Tigers 26–5 combined regular season record earned them the #5 seed in the 2025 NCAA Tournament where they were upset by #12 McNeese St in a game where the Tigers only produced 13 points in the first half but rallied late only to lose by 2 points, 69–67.

== Awards ==
=== Retired Numbers ===
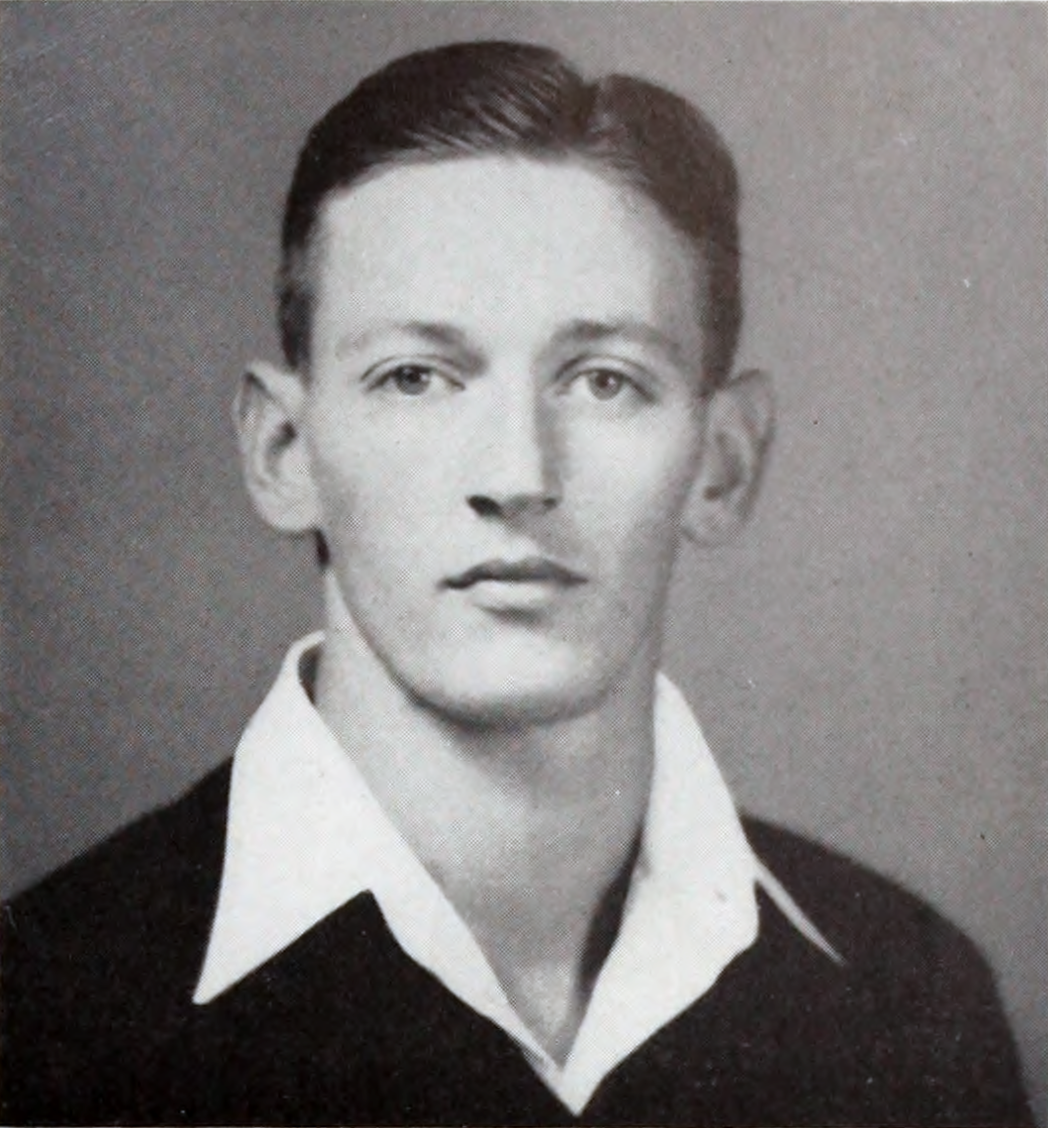
Banks McFadden, whose number 23 was retired by Clemson

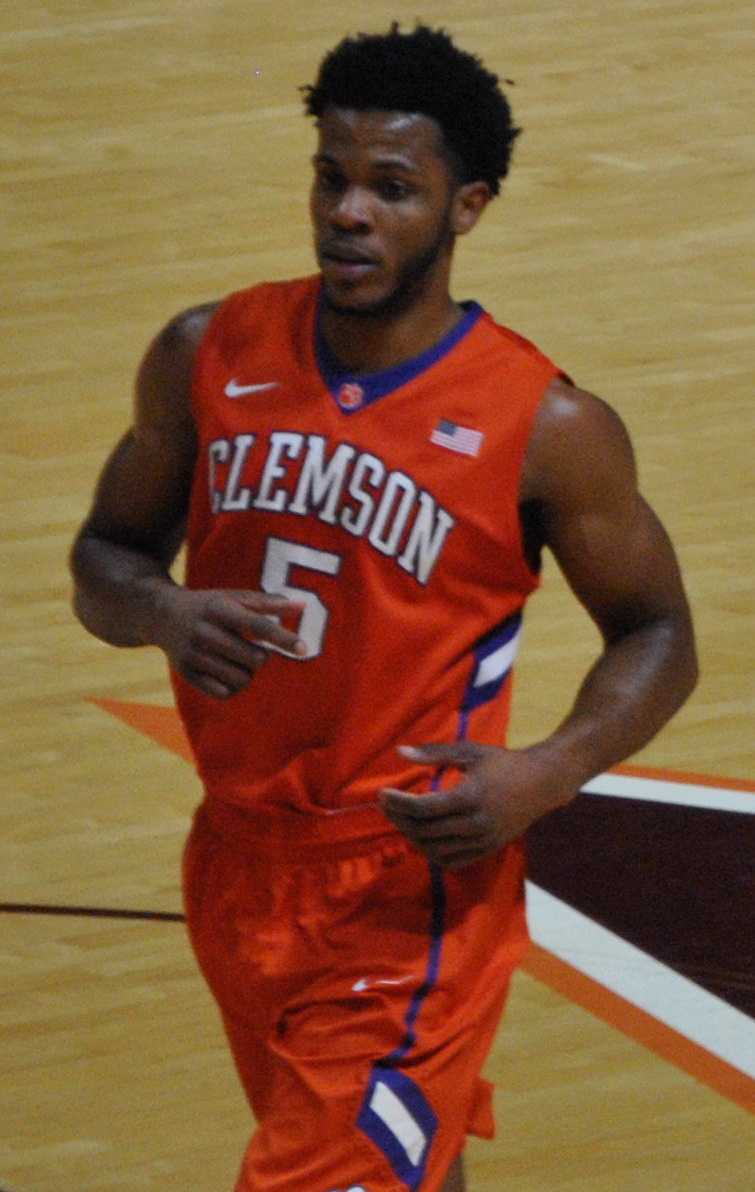
Jaron Blossomgame

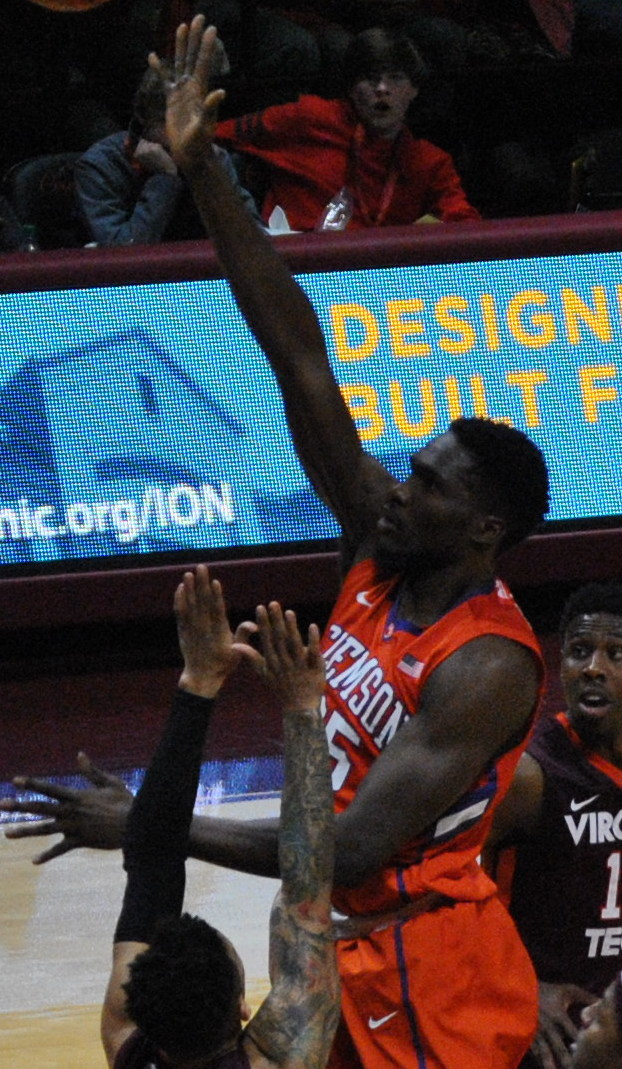
Landry Nnoko

No.	Player	Pos.	Tenure	Ref.
23	Banks McFadden (Note: McFadden is the only Clemson athlete to have retired both, his football (#66) and basketball numbers retired.)		1937–40	
30	Wayne Rollins	C	1973–77	
34	Dale Davis	C	1987–91	

=== All-Americans ===
- Banks McFadden (1939 Helms Foundation)
- Tree Rollins (1977 Helms, 3rd Team – AP)
- Billy Williams (1980 Helms, Honorable Mention – AP)
- Horace Grant (1987 Consensus 2nd Team)
- Elden Campbell & Dale Davis (1990 Honorable Mention – AP)
- Sharone Wright (1994 Honorable Mention – AP)

=== Clemson Ring of Honor ===
- Banks McFadden
- Dale Davis

=== ACC Player of the Year ===
- Horace Grant – 1987

=== ACC Defensive Player of the Year ===
- K. J. McDaniels – 2014

=== ACC Freshman of the Year ===
- Skip Wise – 1975
- Greg Buckner – 1995

=== ACC Most Improved Player ===
- Jaron Blossomgame – 2016
- Ian Schieffelin - 2024

=== ACC All-Defensive Team ===
- Greg Buckner – 1997
- Vernon Hamilton – 2006 & 2007
- James Mays – 2007 & 2008
- Cliff Hammonds – 2008
- Trevor Booker – 2009 & 2010
- K. J. McDaniels – 2014
- Landry Nnoko – 2016

=== ACC Coach of the Year ===
- Cliff Ellis – 1987, 1990

=== All-Southern Conference ===
- Banks McFadden – 1938, 1939, 1940
- Johnny Snee – 1952

=== All-ACC First Team ===
- Vince Yockel – 1958
- Choppy Patterson – 1960
- Randy Mahaffey – 1967
- Skip Wise – 1975
- Billy Williams – 1980
- Horace Grant – 1987
- Dale Davis & Elden Campbell – 1990
- Terrell McIntyre – 1998
- Will Solomon – 2000
- Ed Scott – 2003
- Trevor Booker – 2010
- K. J. McDaniels – 2014
- Jaron Blossomgame – 2016
- Hunter Tyson – 2023
- PJ Hall – 2024
- Chase Hunter – 2025

=== All-ACC Second Team ===
- Bill Yarborough – 1955 & 1956
- Vince Yockel – 1956
- Choppy Patterson – 1961
- Jim Brennan – 1963 & 1964
- Randy Mahaffey – 1965
- Jim Sutherland – 1965, 1967
- Butch Zatezalo – 1968, 1969, 1970
- Tree Rollins – 1975, 1976, 1977
- Stan Rome – 1977
- Larry Nance – 1981
- Vince Hamilton – 1982
- Horace Grant – 1986
- Elden Campbell – 1989
- Dale Davis – 1991
- Sharone Wright – 1994
- Greg Buckner – 1997, 1998
- Terrell McIntyre – 1997, 1999
- Will Solomon – 2001
- K. C. Rivers – 2008
- Trevor Booker – 2009
- Marquise Reed – 2018
- Aamir Simms – 2021
- Ian Schieffelin – 2025

=== All-ACC Third Team ===
- Sharone Wright & Chris Whitney – 1993
- Devin Gray – 1994
- Terrell McIntyre – 1998
- Ed Scott – 2002
- Sharrod Ford – 2005
- Cliff Hammonds – 2008
- Demontez Stitt – 2011
- Devin Booker – 2013
- PJ Hall – 2023

=== NBA Players ===
- Trevor Booker
- Sharrod Ford
- Will Solomon
- Harold Jamison
- Greg Buckner
- Devin Gray
- Sharone Wright
- Chris Whitney
- Dale Davis
- Elden Campbell
- Horace Grant
- Larry Nance
- Tree Rollins
- Skip Wise
- Randy Mahaffey
- K.J. McDaniels
- Jaron Blossomgame
- Hunter Tyson
- PJ Hall

== Postseason ==
=== NCAA tournament results ===
The Tigers have appeared in the NCAA tournament 15 times. Their combined record is 14–15.^*

Year	Seed	Round	Opponent	Result
1980	#6	First Round; Second Round; Sweet Sixteen; Elite Eight	#11 Utah State #3 BYU #10 Lamar #8 UCLA	W 76–73; W 71–66; W 74–66; L 74–85
1987	#4	First Round	#13 SW Missouri State	L 60–65
1989	#9	First Round; Second Round	#8 Saint Mary's #1 Arizona	W 83–70; L 68–94
1990	#5	First Round; Second Round; Sweet Sixteen	#12 BYU #4 La Salle #1 Connecticut	W 49–47; W 79–75; L 70–71
1996	#9	First Round	#8 Georgia	L 74–81
1997	#4	First Round; Second Round; Sweet Sixteen	#13 Miami (OH) #5 Tulsa #1 Minnesota	W 68–56; W 65–59; L 84–90^{2OT}
1998	#6	First Round	#11 Western Michigan	L 72–75
2008	#5	First Round	#12 Villanova	L 69–75
2009	#7	First Round	#10 Michigan	L 59–62
2010	#7	First Round	#10 Missouri	L 78–86
2011	#12	First Four; First Round	#12 UAB #5 West Virginia	W 70–52; L 76–84
2018	#5	First Round; Second Round; Sweet Sixteen	#12 New Mexico State #4 Auburn #1 Kansas	W 79–68; W 84–53; L 76–80
2021	#7	First Round	#10 Rutgers	L 56–60
2024	#6	First Round; Second Round; Sweet Sixteen; Elite Eight	#11 New Mexico #3 Baylor #2 Arizona #4 Alabama	W 77–56; W 72–64; W 77–72; L 82–89
2025	#5	First Round	#12 McNeese State	L 67–69
2026	#8	First Round	#9 Iowa	L 61–67

=== NIT results ===
The Tigers have appeared in the National Invitation Tournament (NIT) 18 times. Their combined record is 19–18.

Year	Round	Opponent	Result
1975	First Round	Providence	L 84–91
1979	First Round; Second Round	Kentucky; Old Dominion	W 68–67; L 59–61
1981	First Round	Temple	L 82–90
1982	First Round	Ole Miss	L 49–53
1985	First Round	Chattanooga	L 65–67
1986	First Round; Second Round; Quarterfinals	Middle Tennessee; Georgia; Wyoming	W 99–81; W 77–65; L 57–62
1988	First Round	Southern Miss	L 69–74
1993	First Round; Second Round	Auburn; UAB	W 84–72; L 64–65
1994	First Round; Second Round; Quarterfinals	Southern Miss; West Virginia; Vanderbilt	W 96–85; W 96–79; L 74–89
1995	First Round	Virginia Tech	L 54–62
1999	First Round; Second Round; Quarterfinals; Semifinals; Final	Georgia; Rutgers; Butler; Xavier; California	W 77–57; W 78–68; W 89–69; W 79–76; L 60–61
2005	First Round	Texas A&M	L 74–82
2006	First Round; Second Round	Louisiana Tech; Louisville	W 69–53; L 68–74
2007	First Round; Second Round; Quarterfinals; Semifinals; Final	East Tennessee State; Ole Miss; Syracuse; Air Force; West Virginia	W 64–57; W 89–68; W 74–70; W 68–67; L 73–78
2014	First Round; Second Round; Quarterfinals; Semifinals	Georgia State; Illinois; Belmont; SMU	W 78–66; W 50–49; W 73–68; L 59–65
2017	First Round	Oakland	L 69–74
2019	First Round; Second Round	Wright State; Wichita State	W 75–69; L 55–63
2023	First Round	Morehead State	L 64–68

== Home courts ==
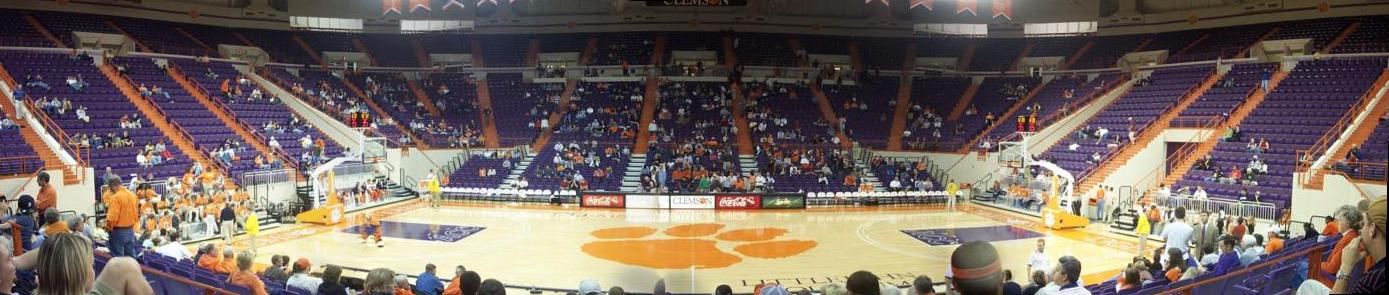
Littlejohn Coliseum before the first game of the 2003–04 season

- Clemson Field House/Fike Field House: 1930–1968
- Littlejohn Coliseum: November 30, 1968 – February 23, 2002; January 5, 2003 – 2015; 2016 – present
- Civic Center of Anderson: November 13, 2002 – December 31, 2002, (For eight games as Littlejohn Coliseum was undergoing renovations)
- Bon Secours Wellness Arena, Greenville: 2015–2016 season, (While Littlejohn Coliseum was undergoing renovations)

== Coaching history ==
=== Current coaching staff ===
- Head coach: Brad Brownell
- Associate head coach: Billy Donlon
- Assistant coach: Dick Bender
- Assistant coach: Sean Dixon
- Director of basketball operations: Andy Assaley
- Special assistant to the head coach: Jeff Reynolds

== Season-by-season results ==
Record table
Season	Coach	Overall	Conference	Standing	Postseason
2009–10	Oliver Purnell	21–11	9–7	T-5th	NCAA First Round
2010–11	Brad Brownell	22–12	9–7	T-4th	NCAA First Round
2011–12	Brad Brownell	16–15	8–8	6th	
2012–13	Brad Brownell	13–18	5–13	T-10th	
2013–14	Brad Brownell	23–13	10–7	6th	NIT Semifinals
2014–15	Brad Brownell	16–15	8–10	9th	
2015–16	Brad Brownell	17–14	10–8	8th	
2016–17	Brad Brownell	17–16	6–12	12th	NIT First Round
2017–18	Brad Brownell	25–10	11–7	T-3rd	NCAA Sweet 16
2018–19	Brad Brownell	20–14	9–9	T-8th	NIT Second Round
2019–20	Brad Brownell	16–15	9–11	8th	
2020–21	Brad Brownell	16–8	10–6	T–5th	NCAA First Round
2021–22	Brad Brownell	17–16	8–12	10th	NIT First Round
2022–23	Brad Brownell	23–11	14–6	T-3rd	
2023–24	Brad Brownell	24–12	11–9	T-5th	NCAA Elite Eight
2024–25	Brad Brownell	27–7	18–2	T-2nd	NCAA First Round
2024–25	Brad Brownell	24–11	12–6	T-4th	NCAA First Round
Since 2009–10:		339–216	167–140		
Total:		1,478–1,383–2	575–864		
