= Billy Williams (basketball) =

American basketball player

Personal information
- Born: September 27, 1958 (age 68) New York City, New York, U.S.
- Listed height: 6 ft 4 in (1.93 m)
- Listed weight: 205 lb (93 kg)

Career information
- High school: Broughton (Raleigh, North Carolina)
- College: Brevard CC (1976–1977); Clemson (1977–1980)
- NBA draft: 1980: 2nd round, 43rd overall pick
- Drafted by: Houston Rockets
- Position: Shooting guard

Career highlights
- First-team All-ACC (1980)
- Stats at Basketball Reference

Wilfred Williams (born September 27, 1958) is an American former basketball player who played one year at Brevard Community College and three years at Clemson University, before being drafted by the Houston Rockets in the 1980 NBA draft. However, he did not play in the NBA.
