= 2024 NCAA Division I men's basketball tournament =

American college basketball tournament

- Season: 2023–24
- Teams: 68
- Finals site: State Farm Stadium, Glendale, Arizona
- Champions: UConn Huskies (6th title, 6th title game, 7th Final Four)
- Runner-up: Purdue Boilermakers (2nd title game, 3rd Final Four)
- Semifinalists: Alabama Crimson Tide (1st Final Four); North Carolina State Wolfpack (4th Final Four)
- Winning coach: Dan Hurley (2nd title)
- MOP: Tristen Newton (UConn Huskies)
- Attendance: 713,877
- Top scorer: Zach Edey (Purdue) (177 points)

The 2024 NCAA Division I men's basketball tournament involved 68 teams playing in a single-elimination tournament to determine the National Collegiate Athletic Association (NCAA) Division I men's basketball national champion for the 2023–24 season. The 85th annual edition of the tournament began on March 19, 2024, and concluded with the UConn Huskies successfully defending their title to become the first repeat champion since Florida in 2007, defeating the Purdue Boilermakers, 75–60, in the championship game on April 8, at State Farm Stadium in Glendale, Arizona.

ASUN champion Stetson and SWAC champion Grambling State made their NCAA tournament debuts. Additionally, Duquesne made its first appearance since 1977, Samford made its first appearance since 2000, McNeese made its first appearance since 2002, and Wagner made its second-ever appearance, its first since 2003.

The first round of the tournament saw the Southeastern Conference (SEC) struggle, with only three out of the initial eight teams advancing to the next round. Three SEC teams suffered first-round upsets. On the other hand, the Pac-12 Conference saw all four of their teams advance to the second round, though Arizona was the only team in the conference to make the Sweet Sixteen.

This was the first NCAA tournament since 2019 to not see a 15-seed defeat a 2-seed. All the 1 and 2-seeds advanced to the Sweet Sixteen, marking only the fifth time it has happened and the first since 2019. Also, with No. 11 seeded NC State advancing to the Sweet Sixteen, this marked the 16th consecutive tournament where a double-digit seed made the regional semifinals. The Wolfpack eventually became the sixth 11-seed to reach the Final Four.

The Final Four consisted of UConn (second consecutive appearance), Alabama (their first Final Four appearance in program history), NC State (first appearance since 1983), and Purdue (first appearance since 1980).

With No. 1 overall seed UConn winning the championship, this was the first time that the top overall seed won the tournament since Kentucky in 2012, along with becoming the first defending champion to advance to the Sweet Sixteen since 2016. (Note: Louisville won the tournament the following year as the top overall seed; however, their title later was vacated due to a sex scandal.)

== Tournament procedure ==
A total of 68 teams entered the 2024 tournament. A total of 32 automatic bids are awarded to each program that won a conference tournament. The remaining 36 bids are issued "at-large", with selections extended by the NCAA Selection Committee. The Selection Committee also seeds the entire field from 1 to 68.

Eight teams (the four-lowest seeded automatic qualifiers and the four lowest-seeded at-large teams) played in the First Four. The winners of those games advanced to the main tournament bracket.

First four out
NET	School	Conference	Record
46	Oklahoma	Big 12	20–12
67	Seton Hall	Big East	20–12
29	Indiana State	MVC	28–6
40	Pittsburgh	ACC	22–11

== Schedule and venues ==
The following are the sites selected to host each round of the 2024 tournament:

2024 First Four (orange) and first and second rounds (green)
2024 Regionals (blue) and Final Four (red)

First Four

- March 19 and 20
  - University of Dayton Arena, Dayton, Ohio (Host: University of Dayton)

First and Second Rounds (Subregionals)

- March 21 and 23
  - Spectrum Center, Charlotte, North Carolina (Host: University of North Carolina at Charlotte)
  - CHI Health Center, Omaha, Nebraska (Host: Creighton University)
  - PPG Paints Arena, Pittsburgh, Pennsylvania (Host: Duquesne University)
  - Delta Center, Salt Lake City, Utah (Host: University of Utah)
- March 22 and 24
  - Barclays Center, Brooklyn, New York (Host: Atlantic 10 Conference)
  - Gainbridge Fieldhouse, Indianapolis, Indiana (Host: IUPUI, Horizon League)
  - FedExForum, Memphis, Tennessee (Host: University of Memphis)
  - Spokane Veterans Memorial Arena, Spokane, Washington (Host: University of Idaho)

Regional Semi-Finals and Finals (Sweet Sixteen and Elite Eight)

- March 28 and 30
  - East Regional
    - TD Garden, Boston, Massachusetts (Host: Boston College)
  - West Regional
    - Crypto.com Arena, Los Angeles, California (Host: Pepperdine University)
- March 29 and 31
  - South Regional
    - American Airlines Center, Dallas, Texas (Host: Big 12 Conference)
  - Midwest Regional
    - Little Caesars Arena, Detroit, Michigan (Hosts: University of Detroit Mercy, Oakland University)

National Semifinals and Championship (Final Four)

- April 6 and 8
  - State Farm Stadium, Glendale, Arizona (Host: Arizona State University)

Glendale hosted the Final Four for the second time, having previously hosted in 2017.

== Qualification and selection of teams ==
The 68 teams came from 34 states and the District of Columbia.

Teams that participated in the 2024 tournament. South Region (red), East Region (blue), Midwest Region (green), and West Region (purple)

=== Automatic qualifiers ===
Teams who won their conference championships automatically qualify.

Automatic qualifiers in the 2024 NCAA Division I men's basketball tournament
Conference	Team	Appearance	Last bid
America East	Vermont	10th	2023
American	UAB	17th	2022
Atlantic 10	Duquesne	6th	1977
ACC	NC State	29th	2023
ASUN	Stetson	1st	Never
Big 12	Iowa State	23rd	2023
Big East	UConn	36th	2023
Big Sky	Montana State	6th	2023
Big South	Longwood	2nd	2022
Big Ten	Illinois	34th	2023
Big West	Long Beach State	7th	2012
CAA	Charleston	7th	2023
CUSA	Western Kentucky	26th	2013
Horizon	Oakland	4th	2011
Ivy League	Yale	7th	2022
MAAC	Saint Peter's	5th	2022
MAC	Akron	6th	2022
MEAC	Howard	4th	2023
Missouri Valley	Drake	7th	2023
Mountain West	New Mexico	16th	2014
NEC	Wagner	2nd	2003
Ohio Valley	Morehead State	9th	2021
Pac-12	Oregon	18th	2021
Patriot	Colgate	7th	2023
SEC	Auburn	13th	2023
Southern	Samford	3rd	2000
Southland	McNeese	3rd	2002
SWAC	Grambling State	1st	Never
Summit League	South Dakota State	7th	2022
Sun Belt	James Madison	6th	2013
WCC	Saint Mary's	13th	2023
WAC	Grand Canyon	3rd	2023

=== Seeds ===
The tournament seeds and regions were determined through the NCAA basketball tournament selection process and were published by the selection committee after the brackets were released on March 17.

East Regional – TD Garden, Boston, MA
Seed	School	Conference	Record	Overall Seed	Berth type	Last bid
1	UConn	Big East	31–3	1	Automatic	2023
2	Iowa State	Big 12	27–7	8	Automatic	2023
3	Illinois	Big Ten	26–8	12	Automatic	2023
4	Auburn	SEC	27–7	15	Automatic	2023
5	San Diego State	Mountain West	24–10	18	At Large	2023
6	BYU	Big 12	23–10	21	At Large	2021
7	Washington State	Pac-12	24–9	26	At Large	2008
8	Florida Atlantic	American	25–8	31	At Large	2023
9	Northwestern	Big Ten	21–11	36	At Large	2023
10	Drake	Missouri Valley	28–6	40	Automatic	2023
11	Duquesne	Atlantic 10	24–11	46	Automatic	1977
12	UAB	American	23–11	50	Automatic	2022
13	Yale	Ivy	22–9	52	Automatic	2022
14	Morehead State	Ohio Valley	26–8	57	Automatic	2021
15	South Dakota State	Summit	22–12	61	Automatic	2022
16	Stetson	ASUN	22–12	64	Automatic	Never

West Regional – Crypto.com Arena, Los Angeles, CA
Seed	School	Conference	Record	Overall Seed	Berth type	Last bid
1	North Carolina	ACC	27–7	4	At Large	2022
2	Arizona	Pac-12	25–8	6	At Large	2023
3	Baylor	Big 12	23–10	9	At Large	2023
4	Alabama	SEC	21–11	16	At Large	2023
5	Saint Mary's	WCC	26–7	20	Automatic	2023
6	Clemson	ACC	21–11	22	At Large	2021
7	Dayton	Atlantic 10	24–7	28	At Large	2017
8	Mississippi State	SEC	21–13	32	At Large	2023
9	Michigan State	Big Ten	19–14	33	At Large	2023
10	Nevada	Mountain West	26–7	37	At Large	2023
11	New Mexico	Mountain West	26–9	44	Automatic	2014
12	Grand Canyon	WAC	29–4	47	Automatic	2023
13	Charleston	CAA	27–7	54	Automatic	2023
14	Colgate	Patriot	25–9	58	Automatic	2023
15	Long Beach State	Big West	21–14	59	Automatic	2012
16*	Howard	MEAC	18–16	67	Automatic	2023
16*	Wagner	NEC	16–15	68	Automatic	2003

South Regional – American Airlines Center, Dallas, TX
Seed	School	Conference	Record	Overall Seed	Berth type	Last bid
1	Houston	Big 12	30–4	2	At Large	2023
2	Marquette	Big East	25–9	7	At Large	2023
3	Kentucky	SEC	23–9	11	At Large	2023
4	Duke	ACC	24–8	13	At Large	2023
5	Wisconsin	Big Ten	22–13	19	At Large	2022
6	Texas Tech	Big 12	23–10	23	At Large	2022
7	Florida	SEC	24–11	25	At Large	2021
8	Nebraska	Big Ten	23–10	29	At Large	2014
9	Texas A&M	SEC	20–14	34	At Large	2023
10*	Boise State	Mountain West	22–10	38	At Large	2023
10*	Colorado	Pac-12	24–10	39	At Large	2021
11	NC State	ACC	22–14	45	Automatic	2023
12	James Madison	Sun Belt	31–3	48	Automatic	2013
13	Vermont	America East	28–6	51	Automatic	2023
14	Oakland	Horizon	23–11	55	Automatic	2011
15	Western Kentucky	C-USA	22–11	60	Automatic	2013
16	Longwood	Big South	21–13	63	Automatic	2022

Midwest Regional – Little Caesars Arena, Detroit, MI
Seed	School	Conference	Record	Overall Seed	Berth type	Last bid
1	Purdue	Big Ten	29–4	3	At Large	2023
2	Tennessee	SEC	24–8	5	At Large	2023
3	Creighton	Big East	23–9	10	At Large	2023
4	Kansas	Big 12	22–10	14	At Large	2023
5	Gonzaga	West Coast	25–7	17	At Large	2023
6	South Carolina	SEC	26–7	24	At Large	2017
7	Texas	Big 12	20–12	27	At Large	2023
8	Utah State	Mountain West	27–6	30	At Large	2023
9	TCU	Big 12	21–12	35	At Large	2023
10*	Virginia	ACC	23–10	41	At Large	2023
10*	Colorado State	Mountain West	24–10	42	At Large	2022
11	Oregon	Pac-12	23–11	43	Automatic	2021
12	McNeese	Southland	30–3	49	Automatic	2002
13	Samford	Southern	29–5	53	Automatic	2000
14	Akron	MAC	24–10	56	Automatic	2022
15	Saint Peter's	MAAC	19–13	62	Automatic	2022
16*	Montana State	Big Sky	17–17	65	Automatic	2023
16*	Grambling State	SWAC	20–14	66	Automatic	Never

*See First Four

== Tournament bracket ==
All times are listed in Eastern Daylight Time (UTC−4)

=== First Four – Dayton, Ohio ===
The First Four games involve eight teams: the four lowest-seeded automatic qualifiers and the four lowest-seeded at-large teams.

March 19 – West Regional
16	Howard	68
16	Wagner	71

March 19 – Midwest Regional
10	Virginia	42
10	Colorado State	67

March 20 – Midwest Regional
16	Montana State	81
16	Grambling State	88^{OT}

March 20 – South Regional
10	Boise State	53
10	Colorado	60

=== East regional – Boston, Massachusetts ===
First round Round of 64; March 21–22
1	UConn	91
16	Stetson	52
Brooklyn – Fri/Sun
8	Florida Atlantic	65
9	Northwestern	77^{OT}
5	San Diego State	69
12	UAB	65
Spokane – Fri/Sun
4	Auburn	76
13	Yale	78
6	BYU	67
11	Duquesne	71
Omaha – Thu/Sat
3	Illinois	85
14	Morehead State	69
7	Washington State	66
10	Drake	61
Omaha – Thu/Sat
2	Iowa State	82
15	South Dakota State	65

Second round Round of 32; March 23–24
1	UConn	75
9	Northwestern	58
5	San Diego State	85
13	Yale	57
11	Duquesne	63
3	Illinois	89
7	Washington State	56
2	Iowa State	67

Regional semifinals Sweet 16; March 28
1	UConn	82
5	San Diego State	52
3	Illinois	72
2	Iowa State	69

Regional Final; Elite 8 March 30
1	UConn	77
3	Illinois	52

==== East regional final ====
TBS

March 30
6:09 p.m. EDT

Recap

No. 3 Illinois Fighting Illini 52, No. 1 UConn Huskies 77
Scoring by half: 23−28, 29−49
Pts: Domask (17); Rebs: Goode (6); Asts: Shannon Jr. (3)	Pts: Clingan (22); Rebs: Clingan (10); Asts: Tied (5)

TD Garden – Boston, Massachusetts
Attendance: 19,181
Referees: Doug Shows, Terry Oglesby, Byron Jarrett

==== East regional all-tournament team ====
- Donovan Clingan (MOP) - UConn
- Cam Spencer - UConn
- Stephon Castle - UConn
- Terrence Shannon Jr. - Illinois
- Jaedon LeDee - San Diego State

=== West regional – Los Angeles, California ===
First round Round of 64; March 21–22
1	North Carolina	90
16	Wagner	62
Charlotte – Thu/Sat
8	Mississippi State	51
9	Michigan State	69
5	Saint Mary's	66
12	Grand Canyon	75
Spokane – Fri/Sun
4	Alabama	109
13	Charleston	96
6	Clemson	77
11	New Mexico	56
Memphis – Fri/Sun
3	Baylor	92
14	Colgate	67
7	Dayton	63
10	Nevada	60
Salt Lake City – Thu/Sat
2	Arizona	85
15	Long Beach State	65

Second round Round of 32; March 23–24
1	North Carolina	85
9	Michigan State	69
12	Grand Canyon	61
4	Alabama	72
6	Clemson	72
3	Baylor	64
7	Dayton	68
2	Arizona	78

Regional semifinals Sweet 16; March 28
1	North Carolina	87
4	Alabama	89
6	Clemson	77
2	Arizona	72

Regional Final; Elite 8 March 30
4	Alabama	89
6	Clemson	82

==== West regional final ====
TBS

March 30
8:49 p.m. EDT

Recap

No. 6 Clemson Tigers 82, No. 4 Alabama Crimson Tide 89
Scoring by half: 32–35, 50–54
Pts: Sears (23); Rebs: Pringle (11); Asts: Estrada (7)	Pts: Girard (19); Rebs: Schieffelin (11); Asts: Hunter (6)

Crypto.com Arena – Los Angeles, California
Attendance: 19,227
Referees: James Breeding, Keith Kimble, Brian Dorsey

==== West regional all-tournament team ====
- Mark Sears (MOP) - Alabama
- Grant Nelson - Alabama
- PJ Hall - Clemson
- Chase Hunter - Clemson
- Ian Schieffelin - Clemson

=== South regional – Dallas, Texas ===
First round Round of 64; March 21–22
1	Houston	86
16	Longwood	46
Memphis – Fri/Sun
8	Nebraska	83
9	Texas A&M	98
5	Wisconsin	61
12	James Madison	72
Brooklyn – Fri/Sun
4	Duke	64
13	Vermont	47
6	Texas Tech	67
11	NC State	80
Pittsburgh – Thu/Sat
3	Kentucky	76
14	Oakland	80
7	Florida	100
10	Colorado	102
Indianapolis – Fri/Sun
2	Marquette	87
15	Western Kentucky	69

Second round Round of 32; March 23–24
1	Houston	100^{OT}
9	Texas A&M	95
12	James Madison	55
4	Duke	93
11	NC State	79^{OT}
14	Oakland	73
10	Colorado	77
2	Marquette	81

Regional semifinals Sweet 16; March 29
1	Houston	51
4	Duke	54
11	NC State	67
2	Marquette	58

Regional Final; Elite 8 March 31
4	Duke	64
11	NC State	76

==== South regional final ====
Related article: Tobacco Road (rivalry)

CBS

March 31
5:05 p.m. EDT

Recap

No. 11 NC State Wolfpack 76, No. 4 Duke Blue Devils 64
Scoring by half: 21−27, 55−37
Pts: Burns (29); Rebs: O'Connell (11); Asts: O'Connell (6)	Pts: McCain (32); Rebs: Filipowski (9); Asts: Proctor (4)

American Airlines Center – Dallas, Texas
Attendance: 16,969
Referees: Michael Irving, Brian O'Connell, Doug Sirmons

==== South regional all-tournament team ====
- D. J. Burns (MOP) - N.C. State
- DJ Horne - N.C. State
- Jared McCain - Duke
- Jamal Shead - Houston
- Tyler Kolek - Marquette

=== Midwest regional – Detroit, Michigan ===
First round Round of 64; March 21–22
1	Purdue	78
16	Grambling State	50
Indianapolis – Fri/Sun
8	Utah State	88
9	TCU	72
5	Gonzaga	86
12	McNeese	65
Salt Lake City – Thu/Sat
4	Kansas	93
13	Samford	89
6	South Carolina	73
11	Oregon	87
Pittsburgh – Thu/Sat
3	Creighton	77
14	Akron	60
7	Texas	56
10	Colorado State	44
Charlotte – Thu/Sat
2	Tennessee	83
15	Saint Peter's	49

Second round Round of 32; March 23–24
1	Purdue	106
8	Utah State	67
5	Gonzaga	89
4	Kansas	68
11	Oregon	73
3	Creighton	86^{2OT}
7	Texas	58
2	Tennessee	62

Regional semifinals Sweet 16; March 29
1	Purdue	80
5	Gonzaga	68
3	Creighton	75
2	Tennessee	82

Regional Final; Elite 8 March 31
1	Purdue	72
2	Tennessee	66

==== Midwest regional final ====
CBS

March 31
2:20 p.m. EDT

Recap

No. 2 Tennessee Volunteers 66, No. 1 Purdue Boilermakers 72
Scoring by half: 34−36, 32−36
Pts: Knecht (37); Rebs: Tied (4); Asts: Zeigler (8)	Pts: Edey (40); Rebs: Edey (16); Asts: Smith (7)

Little Caesars Arena – Detroit, Michigan
Attendance: 18,577
Referees: Ron Groover, Marques Pettigrew, Ray Natali

==== Midwest regional all-tournament team ====
- Zach Edey (MOP) - Purdue
- Braden Smith - Purdue
- Dalton Knecht - Tennessee
- Zakai Zeigler - Tennessee
- Baylor Scheierman - Creighton

=== Final Four – Glendale, Arizona ===
National Semifinals; Final Four; Saturday, April 6
E1	UConn	86
W4	Alabama	72
S11	NC State	50
MW1	Purdue	63

National Championship Game; Monday, April 8
E1	UConn	75
MW1	Purdue	60

==== National semifinals ====
TBS

April 6
6:09 p.m. EDT

Preview

#S11 NC State Wolfpack 50, #MW1 Purdue Boilermakers 63
Scoring by half: 29−35, 21−28
Pts: DJ Horne, 20; Rebs: DJ Horne, 6 Asts: D. J. Burns, 3	Pts: Zach Edey, 20; Rebs: Zach Edey, 12; Asts: Braden Smith, 6

State Farm Stadium – Glendale, Arizona
Attendance: 74,720
Referees: Keith Kimble, Kipp Kissinger, Michael Reed

TBS

April 6
8:49 p.m. EDT

Preview

#W4 Alabama Crimson Tide 72, #E1 UConn Huskies 86
Scoring by half: 40−44, 32−42
Pts: Mark Sears, 24; Rebs: Grant Nelson, 15; Asts: Tied, 3	Pts: Stephon Castle, 21; Rebs: Tied, 8 Asts: Tristen Newton, 9

State Farm Stadium – Glendale, Arizona
Attendance: 74,720
Referees: Ron Groover, Patrick Adams, Paul Szelc

==== National championship ====
TBS

April 8, 2024
9:20 p.m. EDT

Report

#MW1 Purdue Boilermakers 60, #E1 UConn Huskies 75
Scoring by half: 30−36, 30−39
Pts: Zach Edey, 37; Rebs: Zach Edey, 10; Asts: Braden Smith, 8	Pts: Tristen Newton, 20; Rebs: Cam Spencer, 8 Asts: Tristen Newton, 7

State Farm Stadium – Glendale, Arizona
Attendance: 74,423
Referees: Jeffrey Anderson, Terry Oglesby, Roger Ayers

==== Final Four all-tournament team ====
- Tristen Newton (MOP) - UConn
- Stephon Castle - UConn
- Donovan Clingan - UConn
- Zach Edey - Purdue
- Cam Spencer - UConn

== Record by conference ==
Overview of conference performance in the 2024 NCAA Division I men's basketball tournament
Conference	Bids	Record	Win %	FF	R64	R32	S16	E8	F4	CG	NC
Atlantic Coast	5	12–5	.705	1	4	4	4	3	1	–	–
Big East	3	10–2	.833	–	3	3	3	1	1	1	1
Big Ten	6	10–6	.625	–	6	4	2	2	1	1	–
Southeastern	8	8–8	.500	–	8	3	2	2	1	–	–
Big 12	8	7–8	.467	–	8	5	2	–	–	–	–
Pac-12	4	6–4	.600	1	4	4	1	–	–	–	–
Mountain West	6	4–6	.400	2	5	2	1	–	–	–	–
West Coast	2	2–2	.500	–	2	1	1	–	–	–	–
Atlantic 10	2	2–2	.500	–	2	2	–	–	–	–	–
Horizon	1	1–1	.500	–	1	1	–	–	–	–	–
Ivy League	1	1–1	.500	–	1	1	–	–	–	–	–
Sun Belt	1	1–1	.500	–	1	1	–	–	–	–	–
WAC	1	1–1	.500	–	1	1	–	–	–	–	–
Northeast	1	1–1	.500	1	1	–	–	–	–	–	–
SWAC	1	1–1	.500	1	1	–	–	–	–	–	–
American	2	0–2	.000	–	2	–	–	–	–	–	–
America East	1	0–1	.000	–	1	–	–	–	–	–	–
ASUN	1	0–1	.000	–	1	–	–	–	–	–	–
Big South	1	0–1	.000	–	1	–	–	–	–	–	–
Big West	1	0–1	.000	–	1	–	–	–	–	–	–
CAA	1	0–1	.000	–	1	–	–	–	–	–	–
CUSA	1	0–1	.000	–	1	–	–	–	–	–	–
MAAC	1	0–1	.000	–	1	–	–	–	–	–	–
MAC	1	0–1	.000	–	1	–	–	–	–	–	–
Missouri Valley	1	0–1	.000	–	1	–	–	–	–	–	–
Ohio Valley	1	0–1	.000	–	1	–	–	–	–	–	–
Patriot	1	0–1	.000	–	1	–	–	–	–	–	–
Southern	1	0–1	.000	–	1	–	–	–	–	–	–
Southland	1	0–1	.000	–	1	–	–	–	–	–	–
Summit	1	0–1	.000	–	1	–	–	–	–	–	–
Big Sky	1	0–1	.000	1	–	–	–	–	–	–	–
MEAC	1	0–1	.000	1	–	–	–	–	–	–	–

== Game summaries and tournament notes ==
=== Tournament upsets ===
Per the NCAA, an upset occurs "when the losing team in an NCAA tournament game was seeded at least five seed lines better than the winning team."

The 2024 tournament saw a total of 9 upsets, with seven in the first round, one in the Sweet Sixteen and one in the Elite Eight.

Upsets in the 2024 NCAA Division I men's basketball tournament
Round	West	Midwest	South	East
Round of 64	No. 12 Grand Canyon defeated No. 5 Saint Mary's, 75–66	No. 11 Oregon defeated No. 6 South Carolina, 87–73	No. 14 Oakland defeated No. 3 Kentucky, 80–76; No. 11 NC State defeated No. 6 Texas Tech, 80–67; No. 12 James Madison defeated No. 5 Wisconsin, 72–61	No. 11 Duquesne defeated No. 6 BYU, 71–67; No. 13 Yale defeated No. 4 Auburn, 78–76
Round of 32	None	None	None	None
Sweet 16	None	None	No. 11 NC State defeated No. 2 Marquette, 67–58	None
Elite 8	None	None	No. 11 NC State defeated No. 4 Duke, 76–64	None
Final 4	None			
National Championship	None			

== Media coverage ==
=== Television ===
CBS Sports and TNT Sports (formerly Warner Bros. Discovery Sports during the previous 2023 tournament, and Turner Sports two years prior) have US television rights to the tournament. As part of a cycle that began in 2016, TBS televised the 2024 Final Four and the National Championship Game.

This was the first tournament with Ian Eagle as the lead play-by-play announcer.

For the first time since 1997, longtime studio host Greg Gumbel was not part of this year's March Madness coverage due to family health issues. Gumbel died from cancer on December 27, 2024.

Beginning this tournament, Max will be streaming all of its games airing on its networks (TNT, TBS and TruTv) on its Bleacher Report Sports Add-On.

CBS will continue to stream all of its games on Paramount+ and for free on March Madness Live.

==== Television channels ====
- Selection Show – CBS
- First Four – TruTV
- First and Second Rounds – CBS, TBS, TNT and TruTV
- Regional Semifinals (Sweet 16) and Finals (Elite 8) – CBS, TBS, and TruTV
- National Semifinals (Final Four) and Championship – TBS, TNT, and TruTV

==== Studio hosts ====
- Ernie Johnson (New York City and Glendale) – First and second rounds, regionals, Final Four and national championship game
- Adam Lefkoe (Atlanta and Glendale) – First Four, first, second rounds, regional semifinals and Final Four
- Adam Zucker (New York City) – First and second rounds
- Jamie Erdahl – First and second rounds (game breaks)

==== Studio analysts ====
- Charles Barkley (New York City and Glendale) – First and second rounds, regionals, Final Four and national championship game
- Seth Davis (Atlanta and Glendale) – First Four, first and second rounds, regional semifinals and Final Four
- Clark Kellogg (New York City and Glendale) – First and second rounds, regionals, Final Four and national championship game
- Candace Parker (Atlanta and Glendale) – First Four, first and second rounds, regional semifinals and Final Four
- Bruce Pearl (Atlanta) – Regional Semifinals
- Kenny Smith (New York City and Glendale) – First and second rounds, regionals, Final Four and national championship game
- Gene Steratore (New York City and Glendale) (Rules Analyst) – First Four, first and second rounds, regionals, Final Four and national championship game
- Wally Szczerbiak (New York City) – Second round
- Jay Wright (Atlanta, New York City and Glendale) – First Four, first and second rounds, regionals, Final Four and national championship game

==== Broadcast assignments ====
- Ian Eagle/Bill Raftery/Grant Hill/Tracy Wolfson – First and second rounds at Brooklyn, New York; South Regional at Dallas, Texas; Final Four and National Championship at Glendale, Arizona
- Brian Anderson/Jim Jackson/Allie LaForce – First and second rounds at Charlotte, North Carolina; West Regional at Los Angeles, California
- Kevin Harlan/Dan Bonner/Stan Van Gundy/Andy Katz – First and second rounds at Indianapolis, Indiana; East Regional at Boston, Massachusetts
- Andrew Catalon/Steve Lappas/Evan Washburn – First and second rounds at Pittsburgh, Pennsylvania; Midwest Regional at Detroit, Michigan
- Brad Nessler/Brendan Haywood/Dana Jacobson – First and second rounds at Salt Lake City, Utah
- Spero Dedes/Jim Spanarkel/Jon Rothstein – First Four at Dayton, Ohio; First and second rounds at Memphis, Tennessee
- Lisa Byington/Steve Smith/Robbie Hummel/Lauren Shehadi – First and second rounds at Spokane, Washington
- Tom McCarthy/Debbie Antonelli/Avery Johnson/AJ Ross – First and second rounds at Omaha, Nebraska

==== Most watched tournament games ====
(#) Tournament seedings and region in parentheses.

Rank	Round	Date and time (ET)	Matchup			Network	Viewers (millions)	TV rating
1	Elite Eight	March 31, 2024, 5:10 p.m.	(11 S) NC State	76–64	(4 S) Duke	CBS	15.14	6.4
2	National Championship	April 8, 2024, 9:09 p.m.	(1 MW) Purdue	60–75	(1 E) UConn	TBS	14.82	6.5
3	Final Four	April 6, 2024, 8:39 p.m.	(4 W) Alabama	72–86	(1 E) UConn	TBS	14.18	6.7
4	Final Four	April 6, 2024, 6:09 p.m.	(11 S) NC State	50–63	(1 MW) Purdue	TBS	11.45	5.3
5	Elite Eight	March 31, 2024, 2:20 p.m.	(2 MW) Tennessee	66–72	(1 MW) Purdue	CBS	10.39	4.4
6	Second Round	March 23, 2024, 5:36 p.m.	(9 W) Michigan State	69–85	(1 W) North Carolina	CBS	10.02	5.0
7	Second Round	March 23, 2024, 3:15 p.m.	(5 MW) Gonzaga	89–68	(4 MW) Kansas	CBS	8.28	4.38
8	Second Round	March 24, 2024, 2:40 p.m.	(8 MW) Utah State	67–106	(1 MW) Purdue	CBS	8.08	4.34
9	Second Round	March 24, 2024, 5:15 p.m.	(12 S) James Madison	55–93	(4 S) Duke	CBS	7.80	4.03
10	Elite Eight	March 30, 2024, 9:44 p.m.	(6 W) Clemson	82–89	(4 W) Alabama	TBS	7.80	3.80

=== Radio ===
Westwood One had exclusive coverage of the entire tournament.

==== First Four ====
- Nate Gatter and Jim Boeheim – at Dayton, Ohio

==== First and second rounds ====
- Jason Benetti and Casey Jacobsen – Charlotte, North Carolina
- Kevin Kugler and Stephen Bardo – Omaha, Nebraska
- Scott Graham and Jordan Cornette – Pittsburgh, Pennsylvania
- Dave Pasch and P. J. Carlesimo – Salt Lake City, Utah
- Chris Carrino and Jon Crispin – Brooklyn, New York
- Ted Emrich and Austin Croshere – Indianapolis, Indiana
- John Sadak and Tom Crean – Memphis, Tennessee
- Ryan Radtke and Dan Dickau – Spokane, Washington

==== Regionals ====
- Tom McCarthy (Thursday)/Scott Graham (Saturday) and Jordan Cornette – East Regional at Boston, Massachusetts
- Spero Dedes and Austin Croshere – West Regional at Los Angeles, California
- Ryan Radtke and P. J. Carlesimo – South Regional at Dallas, Texas
- Kevin Kugler and Robbie Hummel – Midwest Regional at Detroit, Michigan

==== Final Four and national championship ====
- Kevin Kugler, Jim Jackson, Clark Kellogg, and Andy Katz – Glendale, Arizona

=== Internet ===
Video

Live video of games is available for streaming through the following means:

- NCAA March Madness Live (website and app, CBS games available for free on digital media players; access to all other games requires TV Everywhere authentication through provider)
- Paramount+ (only CBS games)
- Max (only TBS, TNT, and truTV games)
- Watch TBS website and app (only TBS games, required TV Everywhere authentication)
- Watch TNT website and app (only TNT games, required TV Everywhere authentication)
- Watch truTV website and app (only truTV games, required TV Everywhere authentication)
- CBS website and app (only CBS games, required TV Everywhere authentication)
- Websites and apps of cable, satellite, and OTT providers of CBS, TBS, TNT, and truTV (access required subscription)

For the app this year, a multiview which showed all games airing simultaneously was available for the second straight year.

In addition, the March Madness app will offer Fast Break, whiparound coverage of games similar to NFL RedZone on the First weekend of the tournament (First and Second rounds).

- Dave Briggs, Tony Delk, Randolph Childress, Josh Pastner (Atlanta)

Audio

Live audio of games is available for streaming through the following means:

- NCAA March Madness Live (website and app)
- Westwood One Sports website
- TuneIn (website and app, required TuneIn Premium subscription)
- Varsity Network app
- Websites and apps of Westwood One Sports affiliates

The March Madness app also supported Apple CarPlay and Android Auto through a native app.

== See also ==
- 2024 NCAA Division I women's basketball tournament
- 2024 NCAA Division II men's basketball tournament
- 2024 NCAA Division III men's basketball tournament
- 2024 National Invitation Tournament
- 2024 College Basketball Invitational
