= Asheville Championship =

US Basketball tournament

- Asheville Championship logo
- Sport: College basketball
- Founded: 2021
- Founder: KemperLesnik
- Folded: 2023
- No. of teams: 4
- Country: United States
- Venues: Harrah's Cherokee Center; Asheville, NC
- Last champion: Clemson
- Broadcaster: ESPN

The Asheville Championship was a two-day college basketball tournament held in Asheville, North Carolina at Harrah's Cherokee Center. The inaugural tournament took place during the opening week of the 2021–22 season, and aired on the ESPN family of networks. The tournament is unofficially a continuation of the 2020 Camping World Maui Invitational, which was held in Asheville because of restrictions. The final tournament was held in 2023.

== Champions ==
Year	Champion
2021	Minnesota
2022	Louisiana
2023	Clemson

== Brackets ==
=== 2023 ===
Semifinals; Friday, November 10
Clemson	77
UAB	76
Davidson	64
Maryland	61

Championship Game; Sunday, November 12
Clemson	68
Davidson	65
Consolation Game; November 12
UAB	66
Maryland	63

=== 2022 ===
Semifinals; November 11
Louisiana	75
Harvard	61
Elon	64
East Tennessee State	77

Championship Game; November 13
Louisiana	81
East Tennessee State	77
Consolation Game; November 13
Harvard	92
Elon	77

=== 2021 ===
* – Denotes overtime period

Semifinals; November 12
Western Kentucky	69
Minnesota	73
Princeton	66
South Carolina	62

Championship Game; November 14
Minnesota	87**
Princeton	80
Consolation Game; November 14
Western Kentucky	64
South Carolina	75
