= Vernon Hamilton =

American basketball player & coach (born 1984)

LSU Tigers
- Title: Assistant coach
- League: Southeastern conference

Personal information
- Born: December 28, 1984 (age 41) Richmond, Virginia, U.S.
- Listed height: 6 ft 1 in (1.85 m)
- Listed weight: 195 lb (88 kg)

Career information
- High school: Benedictine (Richmond, Virginia)
- College: Clemson (2003–2007)
- NBA draft: 2007: undrafted
- Playing career: 2007–2013
- Position: Point guard
- Coaching career: 2014–present

Career history

Playing
- 2007: Darüşşafaka
- 2008: Liepājas Lauvas
- 2008: Fort Wayne Mad Ants
- 2009: Colorado 14ers
- 2009: SAM Massagno Basket
- 2010: MBC Mykolaiv
- 2010: Austin Toros
- 2010–2011: Dakota Wizards
- 2011: Tianjin Ronggang
- 2011–2012: Hoops Club
- 2012: Iowa Energy
- 2012–2013: ENAD
- 2013: Waikato Pistons

Coaching
- 2014–2016: Clemson (graduate assistant)
- 2017–2018: Dallas Mavericks (player development staff)
- 2018–2020: Jeonju KCC Egis (associate head coach)
- 2020–2021: LSU (administrative assistant)
- 2021–2022: LSU (director of player development)
- 2022–2023: Georgetown (director of player development)
- 2023–2025: McNeese (assistant)
- 2025–2026: NC State (assistant)
- 2026–present: LSU (assistant)

Career highlights
- NBA D-League champion (2009); ACC All-Defensive team (2006)

Vernon Wesley Hamilton (born December 28, 1984) is an American college basketball coach and former player, currently an assistant coach at Louisiana State University (LSU). He played for the Clemson Tigers, setting program records for steals. Hamilton played professionally overseas from 2007 until 2013.

== High school career ==
Hamilton was ranked the number 83 high school prospect in the country his senior season. Hamilton averaged 24 points as a senior, along with averages of 7.7 assists, 6.2 rebounds, and 3 steals per game and lead Benedictine High School to its first ever Virginia private school state title. Hamilton was also all-state and all-conference as a defensive back and wide receiver, and received several offers to play college football.

== College career ==
After graduating from high school Vernon Hamilton signed with the Clemson Tigers. Hamilton was a 4-year starter during his tenure with Clemson. Hamilton was an honorable mention selection for the AP All-ACC Freshman team in 2004. Hamilton was on the All-ACC Defensive team in 2006 and 2007. Hamilton was the first Clemson player since 1998 to be invited to play in the 2007 NABC All Star Game. Hamilton finished his career at Clemson as the record holder for most steals in a season (83), highest average steals per game in a season (2.68), and the Clemson career steals record (271). In addition, Hamilton ranks ninth all-time in assists (399). He obtained his undergraduate and master's degrees at Clemson.

=== College statistics ===
Season Averages
| Season | Team | G | PTS | REB | AST | STL | BLK | FG% | 3P% | FT% | MIN | TO |
|---|---|---|---|---|---|---|---|---|---|---|---|---|
| 2003–04 | Clemson Tigers | 28 | 7.3 | 3.7 | 3.25 | 1.79 | 0 | .385 | .333 | .524 | 26.9 | 3.1 |
| 2004–05 | Clemson Tigers | 32 | 6.8 | 2.6 | 2.88 | 2.13 | .03 | .425 | .244 | .602 | 25.5 | 2.62 |
| 2005–06 | Clemson Tigers | 31 | 12.0 | 3.2 | 3.03 | 2.68 | .13 | .447 | .355 | .551 | 30.2 | 2.68 |
| 2006–07 | Clemson Tigers | 36 | 12.3 | 3.1 | 3.39 | 1.95 | .08 | .468 | .306 | .490 | 31.5 | 2.64 |
| Totals: | | 127 | 9.7 | 3.1 | 3.14 | 2.13 | .06 | .440 | .315 | .541 | 28.6 | 2.74 |

== Professional career ==
=== NBA and NBA D-League ===
On September 29, 2008, Hamilton signed a contract with the Cleveland Cavaliers and played in several pre-season games earning high praise from coach Mike Brown. Brown was quoted as saying "I thought Vern Hamilton had a terrific game for us."

On September 28, 2010, Hamilton signed a contract with the Detroit Pistons. He went on to play in 5 preseason games for the Pistons.

Hamilton also had workouts with both the Dallas Mavericks and Washington Wizards.

=== International ===
In 2013 Hamilton played 17 games for ENAD of the Cyprus Basketball Division 1 and averaged 8.5 points, 5 rebounds, 1.8 assists, and 2.3 steals per game.

In 2010–2011 Hamilton went to play for the Tianjin Ronggang Golden Lions in the Chinese Basketball Association where he averaged 26.8 points 8.5 rebounds 4.9 assists, and 5.0 steals per game.

== Coaching career ==
After the conclusion of his playing career, Hamilton became a graduate assistant coach under Brad Brownell at Clemson.

After serving under Will Wade as an administrative assistant at LSU, Hamilton first served as an assistant coach for McNeese State and North Carolina State under Wade, before eventually following him back to LSU in 2026.

== Personal life ==
Hamilton is an active member of 100 Black Men of America in Atlanta, Georgia.

== See also ==
Clemson Tigers men's basketball statistical leaders
