= 2023–24 Clemson Tigers men's basketball team =

American college basketball team

2023–24 Clemson Tigers men's basketball

Asheville Championship champions

NCAA tournament, Elite Eight
- Conference: Atlantic Coast Conference

Ranking
- Coaches: No. 15
- AP: No. 14
- Record: 24–12 (11–9 ACC)
- Head coach: Brad Brownell (14th season)
- Associate head coach: Billy Donlon (2nd season)
- Assistant coaches: Sean Dixon (2nd season); Dick Bender (8th season)
- Home arena: Littlejohn Coliseum (Capacity: 9,000)

2023–24 ACC men's basketball standings
	Conf.				Overall
Team	W		L	PCT	W		L	PCT
No. 7 North Carolina	17	–	3	.850	29	–	8	.784
No. 9 Duke	15	–	5	.750	27	–	9	.750
Virginia	13	–	7	.650	23	–	11	.676
Pittsburgh	12	–	8	.600	22	–	11	.667
Wake Forest	11	–	9	.550	21	–	14	.600
No. 14 Clemson	11	–	9	.550	24	–	12	.667
Syracuse	11	–	9	.550	20	–	12	.625
Virginia Tech	10	–	10	.500	19	–	15	.559
Florida State	10	–	10	.500	17	–	16	.515
No. 10 NC State †	9	–	11	.450	26	–	15	.634
Boston College	8	–	12	.400	20	–	16	.556
Notre Dame	7	–	13	.350	13	–	20	.394
Georgia Tech	7	–	13	.350	14	–	18	.438
Miami (FL)	6	–	14	.300	15	–	17	.469
Louisville	3	–	17	.150	8	–	24	.250
† 2024 ACC tournament winner Rankings from AP Poll

The 2023–24 Clemson Tigers men's basketball team represented Clemson University during the 2023–24 NCAA Division I men's basketball season. The Tigers were led by 14th-year head coach Brad Brownell and played their home games at Littlejohn Coliseum in Clemson, South Carolina as members of the Atlantic Coast Conference.

The Tigers began the season with nine straight wins. This included a one-point win over UAB and a three-point win over Davidson to claim the Asheville Championship. They continued their strong start to the season, upsetting twenty-third ranked Alabama in the ACC–SEC Challenge. They opened the ACC season with a nine-point win at Pittsburgh. They debuted in the national rankings at twenty-fourth before their rivalry game with South Carolina. They won that game and their ensuing game against TCU for their ninth win of the season. After the win, they achieved their highest ranking during the season of thirteenth. Their first defeat was by two-points against Memphis on December 16, 2023. They won their final two non-conference games to finish their non-conference season 10–1. Their non-conference success did not carry into the start of their ACC season as they lost four of their first five games. A loss to Miami (FL) and eighth-ranked North Carolina dropped them to twenty-first in the rankings. Despite defeating Boston College and losing to Virginia Tech, the Tigers fell out of the rankings. A double-overtime loss to Georgia Tech capped the first five games. The Tigers won five of their next seven games, including only their second ever win at North Carolina. They lost by a point at twelfth-ranked Duke and also by a point to Virginia. They Tigers won four of their last six games including the completion of a season sweep against Pittsburgh and Florida State. They ended the season with a loss to Wake Forest. After the season, Ian Schieffelin was named ACC Most Improved Player, becoming the second Clemson player to win the award. PJ Hall was named to the All-ACC First Team.

The Tigers finished the season 24–12 and 11–9 in ACC play to finish in a three-way tie for fifth place. As the sixth seed in the ACC tournament, were defeated by Boston College in the Second Round. They earned an at-large bid to the NCAA tournament and were placed as the sixth-seed in the West region. They defeated eleventh-seed New Mexico in the First Round, third-seed Baylor in the Second Round and second-seed Arizona in the Sweet Sixteen. This advanced Clemson to only their second Elite Eight in program history. In the Elite Eight the Tigers lost in a rematch of an early season game against Alabama 89–82 to end their season.

== Previous season ==
The Tigers finished the 2022–23 season 23–11, 14–6 in ACC play, in a three-way tie for third place. As the third seed in the ACC tournament, they earned a bye into the Quarterfinals where they defeated sixth seed NC State for the third time during the season. They fell to second seeded Virginia in the semifinals. They were not selected for the NCAA tournament and were listed as the fourth team out on Selection Sunday. They received a first overall seed in the National Invitation Tournament. Despite being the first seed, and hosting, the Tigers lost to Morehead State in the first round to end their season.

Clemson started the season 6–0 in ACC play, for the first time since the ACC was created as a conference. Their previous best was in the 1996–97 season when they started 5–0. The Tigers continued their run by defeating Duke but then lost to Wake Forest to end their undefeated run. They won their next two games and were 9–1 at the halfway point of the conference season. This gave the team its best six, seven, eight, nine and ten game starts in conference history. The Tigers would set another program record on February 15, 2023, when they defeated Florida State 94–54 at home. This was the Tigers' widest margin of victory in ACC play, beating the previous record of a 34-point win in 1975.

== Offseason ==
=== Departures ===
Clemson Departures
Name	Number	Pos.	Height	Weight	Year	Hometown	Reason for departure
Hunter Tyson	5	F	6'8"	215	(redshirt) Senior	Monroe, NC	Graduated/2023 NBA draft; selected 37th overall by Oklahoma City Thunder
Ben Middlebrooks	10	F/C	6'10"	232	Sophomore	Fort Lauderdale, FL	Transferred to NC State
Brevin Galloway	11	G	6'2"	215	GS Senior	Anderson, SC	Graduated
Chauncey Gibson	13	G	6'5"	190	Freshman	Dallas, TX	Transferred to Tulsa
Devin Foster	14	G	6'2"	180	Senior	Canton, MA	Walk-on; graduated
Jack Nauseef	15	G	6'1"	160	Senior	Dayton, OH	Walk-on; graduated

=== Incoming transfers ===
Clemson incoming transfers
Name	Number	Pos.	Height	Weight	Year	Hometown	Previous school
Jake Heidbreder	3	G	6'5.5"	180	Junior	Floyds Knobs, IN	Air Force
Jack Clark	5	G	6'8"	200	GS Senior	Wyncote, PA	NC State
Joseph Girard III	11	G	6'1"	190	GS Senior	Glen Falls, NY	Syracuse
Bas Leyte	33	F	6'10"	220	GS Senior	Bergen op Zoom, Netherlands	UNC Greensboro

=== 2023 recruiting class ===
College recruiting information
Name	Hometown	School	Height	Weight	Commit date
Asa Thomas #21 PF	Lake Forest, IL	Lake Forest Academy	6 ft 7 in (2.01 m)	190 lb (86 kg)	Jul 14, 2022
Asa Thomas #21 PF	Recruit ratings: Scout: Rivals: 247Sports: ESPN: (78)				
Overall recruit ranking:
Note: In many cases, Scout, Rivals, 247Sports, On3, and ESPN may conflict in their listings of height and weight.; In these cases, the average was taken. ESPN grades are on a 100-point scale.; Sources: "2023 Clemson Basketball Commitment List". Rivals.; "Clemson Tigers". ESPN.; "2023 Team Ranking". Rivals.

=== 2024 recruiting class ===
College recruiting information (2024)
Name	Hometown	School	Height	Weight	Commit date
Dallas Thomas #24 SF	Little Rock, AR	Parkview Arts & Science Magnet High School	6 ft 7 in (2.01 m)	190 lb (86 kg)	Jul 11, 2023
Dallas Thomas #24 SF	Recruit ratings: Scout: Rivals: 247Sports: ESPN: (83)				
Overall recruit ranking:
Note: In many cases, Scout, Rivals, 247Sports, On3, and ESPN may conflict in their listings of height and weight.; In these cases, the average was taken. ESPN grades are on a 100-point scale.; Sources: "2024 Clemson Basketball Commitment List". Rivals.; "Clemson Tigers". ESPN.; "2024 Team Ranking". Rivals.

== Roster ==
2023–24 Clemson Tigers men's basketball team
Players
Coaches

Pos.	#	Name	Height	Weight	Year	Hometown
G	0	Josh Beadle	6 ft 3.5 in (1.92 m)	180 lb (82 kg)	RS So	Columbia, South Carolina
G	1	Chase Hunter	6 ft 4.5 in (1.94 m)	200 lb (91 kg)	RS Sr	Atlanta, Georgia
G	2	Dillon Hunter	6 ft 3.5 in (1.92 m)	187 lb (85 kg)	So	Atlanta, Georgia
G	3	Jake Heidbreder	6 ft 5.5 in (1.97 m)	180 lb (82 kg)	Jr	Floyds Knobs, Indiana
F	4	Ian Schieffelin	6 ft 8 in (2.03 m)	238 lb (108 kg)	Jr	Loganville, Georgia
G	5	Jack Clark	6 ft 10 in (2.08 m)	207 lb (94 kg)	GS	Wyncote, Pennsylvania
F	10	RJ Godfrey	6 ft 8 in (2.03 m)	228 lb (103 kg)	So	Suwanee, Georgia
G	11	Joseph Girard III	6 ft 2 in (1.88 m)	189 lb (86 kg)	GS	Glens Falls, New York
G	12	Alex Hemenway (injured)	6 ft 4 in (1.93 m)	192 lb (87 kg)	GS	Newburgh, Indiana
G	13	Andrew Latiff (W)	6 ft 5 in (1.96 m)	184 lb (83 kg)	Sr	Clemson, South Carolina
F	15	Asa Thomas	6 ft 7 in (2.01 m)	185 lb (84 kg)	Fr	Lake Forest, Illinois
G	20	Matt Kelly (W)	6 ft 2 in (1.88 m)	175 lb (79 kg)	So	Charleston, South Carolina
F	21	Chauncey Wiggins	6 ft 10.5 in (2.1 m)	210 lb (95 kg)	So	Covington, Georgia
C	24	PJ Hall	6 ft 10.5 in (2.1 m)	238 lb (108 kg)	Sr	Spartanburg, South Carolina
F	32	Daniel Nauseef (W)	6 ft 7 in (2.01 m)	210 lb (95 kg)	Jr	Dayton, Ohio
F	33	Bas Leyte	6 ft 10.5 in (2.1 m)	225 lb (102 kg)	GS	Bergen op Zoom, Netherlands

Head coach

- Brad Brownell (DePauw)

Assistant coach(es)

- Billy Donlon (UNC Wilmington)
- Sean Dixon (Presbyterian)
- Dick Bender (McDaniel)

Legend

- (C) Team captain
- (S) Suspended
- (I) Ineligible
- (W) Walk-on
- Injured
- Current redshirt

Roster

== Schedule and results ==
Date time, TV	Rank^{#}	Opponent^{#}	Result	Record	High points	High rebounds	High assists	Site (attendance) city, state
Exhibition
November 1, 2023*; 7:00 p.m.		Newberry	W 90–39	–	14 – Hall	13 – Schieffelin	3 – Tied	Littlejohn Coliseum (–); Clemson, SC
Regular season
November 6, 2023*; 7:00 p.m., ACCNX/ESPN+		Winthrop	W 78–56	1–0	20 – Hall	7 – Schieffelin	4 – Girard III	Littlejohn Coliseum (6,361); Clemson, SC
November 10, 2023*; 9:30 p.m., ESPN+		vs. UAB; Asheville Championship semifinals	W 77–76	2–0	27 – Hall	9 – Hall	4 – Tied	Harrah's Cherokee Center (3,319); Asheville, NC
November 12, 2023*; 3:00 p.m., ESPN2		vs. Davidson; Asheville Championship game	W 68–65	3–0	17 – Tied	7 – Tied	5 – Girard III	Harrah's Cherokee Center (3,129); Asheville, NC
November 19, 2023*; 1:00 p.m., ACCNX/ESPN+		Boise State	W 85–68	4–0	23 – Girard III	9 – Schieffelin	4 – C. Hunter	Littlejohn Coliseum (5,748); Clemson, SC
November 24, 2023*; 8:00 p.m., ACCN		Alcorn State	W 90–69	5–0	29 – Hall	10 – Schieffelin	7 – C. Hunter	Littlejohn Coliseum (5,791); Clemson, SC
November 28, 2023*; 9:30 p.m., ESPN		at No. 23 Alabama; ACC–SEC Challenge	W 85–77	6–0	21 – Hall	14 – Schieffelin	4 – Girard III	Coleman Coliseum (10,725); Tuscaloosa, AL
December 3, 2023; 2:00 p.m., ACCN		at Pittsburgh	W 79–70	7–0 (1–0)	25 – Girard III	17 – Schieffelin	5 – C. Hunter	Petersen Events Center (7,713); Pittsburgh, PA
December 6, 2023*; 8:00 p.m., ACCN	No. 24	South Carolina; Rivalry	W 72–67	8–0	15 – Wiggins	12 – Schieffelin	3 – Tied	Littlejohn Coliseum (9,000); Clemson, SC
December 9, 2023*; 4:00 p.m., FS1	No. 24	vs. TCU; Basketball Hall of Fame Series Toronto	W 74–66	9–0	21 – Girard III	10 – Godfrey	5 – Schieffelin	Coca-Cola Coliseum (5,281); Toronto, ON
December 16, 2023*; 3:00 p.m., ESPN+	No. 13	at Memphis	L 77–79	9–1	21 – Hall	11 – Schieffelin	6 – Schieffelin	FedExForum (15,052); Memphis, TN
December 22, 2023*; 6:00 p.m., ACCN	No. 18	Queens (NC)	W 109–79	10–1	27 – Hall	6 – Tied	6 – Girard III	Littlejohn Coliseum (6,871); Clemson, SC
December 29, 2023*; 7:00 p.m., ACCNX/ESPN+	No. 18	Radford	W 93–58	11–1	24 – Girard III	13 – Schieffelin	5 – C. Hunter	Littlejohn Coliseum (7,276); Clemson, SC
January 3, 2024; 8:00 p.m., ESPN	No. 16	at Miami (FL)	L 82–95	11–2 (1–1)	18 – Girard III	11 – Schieffelin	5 – Girard III	Watsco Center (6,800); Coral Gables, FL
January 6, 2024; 12:00 p.m., ESPN2	No. 16	No. 8 North Carolina	L 55–65	11–3 (1–2)	17 – C. Hunter	11 – Schieffelin	2 – Tied	Littlejohn Coliseum (9,000); Clemson, SC
January 10, 2024; 7:00 p.m., ESPN2	No. 21	at Virginia Tech	L 72–87	11–4 (1–3)	15 – Schieffelin	8 – Schieffelin	4 – Girard III	Cassell Coliseum (8,925); Blacksburg, VA
January 13, 2024; 3:00 p.m., ACCN	No. 21	Boston College	W 89–78	12–4 (2–3)	26 – Tied	1 – Hall	3 – Beadle	Littlejohn Coliseum (8,708); Clemson, SC
January 16, 2024; 9:00 p.m., ACCN		Georgia Tech	L 90–93 ^{2OT}	12–5 (2–4)	31 – Hall	17 – Hall	4 – Schieffelin	Littlejohn Coliseum (7,217); Clemson, SC
January 20, 2024; 4:00 p.m., ACCN		at Florida State	W 78–67	13–5 (3–4)	14 – C. Hunter	7 – Tied	4 – Tied	Donald L. Tucker Civic Center (10,033); Tallahassee, FL
January 27, 2024; 4:00 p.m., ESPN		at No. 12 Duke	L 71–72	13–6 (3–5)	19 – Hall	11 – Schieffelin	4 – Schieffelin	Cameron Indoor Stadium (9,314); Durham, NC
January 30, 2024; 9:00 p.m., ACCN		Louisville	W 70–64	14–6 (4–5)	25 – Hall	8 – Schieffelin	4 – Wiggins	Littlejohn Coliseum (6,760); Clemson, SC
February 3, 2024; 2:00 p.m., ESPN		Virginia	L 65–66	14–7 (4–6)	19 – Hall	9 – Schieffelin	3 – Schieffelin	Littlejohn Coliseum (9,000); Clemson, SC
February 6, 2024; 7:00 p.m., ESPN		at No. 3 North Carolina	W 80–76	15–7 (5–6)	25 – Hall	11 – Schieffelin	5 – C. Hunter	Dean Smith Center (20,689); Chapel Hill, NC
February 10, 2024; 12:00 p.m., ESPN2		at Syracuse	W 77–68	16–7 (6–6)	18 – Girard III	10 – Tied	7 – C. Hunter	JMA Wireless Dome (23,050); Syracuse, NY
February 14, 2024; 7:00 p.m., ESPN2		Miami (FL)	W 77–60	17–7 (7–6)	20 – C. Hunter	11 – Schieffelin	5 – Girard III	Littlejohn Coliseum (7,211); Clemson, SC
February 17, 2024; 7:45 p.m., The CW		NC State	L 77–78	17–8 (7–7)	23 – Girard III	7 – Tied	3 – Girard III	Littlejohn Coliseum (9,000); Clemson, SC
February 21, 2024; 7:00 p.m., ACCN		at Georgia Tech	W 81–57	18–8 (8–7)	19 – Schieffelin	6 – C. Hunter	6 – C. Hunter	McCamish Pavilion (4,567); Atlanta, GA
February 24, 2024; 7:45 p.m., The CW		Florida State	W 74–63	19–8 (9–7)	24 – Girard III	11 – Tied	4 – C. Hunter	Littlejohn Coliseum (9,000); Clemson, SC
February 27, 2024; 7:00 p.m., ACCN		Pittsburgh	W 69–62	20–8 (10–7)	15 – Tied	12 – Schieffelin	3 – Schieffelin	Littlejohn Coliseum (7,346); Clemson, SC
March 2, 2024; 7:45 p.m., The CW		at Notre Dame	L 62–69	20–9 (10–8)	21 – Hall	14 – Schieffelin	3 – Schieffelin	Joyce Center (7,313); South Bend, IN
March 5, 2024; 7:00 p.m., ESPN2		Syracuse	W 90–75	21–9 (11–8)	25 – Hall	16 – Schieffelin	5 – Clark	Littlejohn Coliseum (9,000); Clemson, SC
March 9, 2024; 6:00 p.m., ACCN		at Wake Forest	L 76–81	21–10 (11–9)	18 – Hall	6 – Schieffelin	4 – Hall	LJVM Coliseum (12,288); Winston-Salem, NC
ACC tournament
March 13, 2024; 9:30 p.m., ESPNU	(6)	vs. (11) Boston College; Second Round	L 55–76	21–11	21 – Hall	7 – Girard III	4 – Schieffelin	Capital One Arena (13,445); Washington, D.C.
NCAA tournament
March 22, 2024; 3:10 p.m., TruTV	(6 W)	vs. (11 W) New Mexico; First Round	W 77–56	22–11	21 – C. Hunter	12 – Schieffelin	4 – Clark	FedExForum (12,754); Memphis, TN
March 24, 2024; 6:10 p.m., TNT	(6 W)	vs. (3 W) No. 14 Baylor; Second Round	W 72–64	23–11	20 – C. Hunter	8 – Clark	6 – C. Hunter	FedExForum (13,506); Memphis, TN
March 28, 2024*; 7:09 p.m., CBS	(6 W)	vs. (2 W) No. 9 Arizona; Sweet Sixteen	W 77–72	24–11	18 – C. Hunter	8 – Hall	6 – Girard III	Crypto.com Arena (19,625); Los Angeles, CA
March 30, 2024*; 8:49 p.m., TBS/TruTV	(6 W)	vs. (4 W) No. 19 Alabama; Elite Eight	L 82–89	24–12	19 – Girard III	11 – Schieffelin	6 – C. Hunter	Crypto.com Arena (19,227); Los Angeles, CA
*Non-conference game. ^{#}Rankings from AP poll. (#) Tournament seedings in parentheses. W=West. All times are in Eastern Time.

== Rankings ==
Ranking movements Legend: ██ Increase in ranking ██ Decrease in ranking — = Not ranked RV = Received votes
	Week																				
Poll	Pre	1	2	3	4	5	6	7	8	9	10	11	12	13	14	15	16	17	18	19	Final
AP	—	RV	RV	RV	24	13	18	18	16	21	RV	—	—	—	RV	RV	RV	—	—	RV	14
Coaches	—	RV	RV	RV	20	11	18	17	16	22	RV	RV	—	—	RV	RV	RV	RV	—	—	15

== Statistics ==
Player	GP	GS	MPG	FG%	3P%	FT%	RPG	APG	PPG
PJ Hall	36	36	28.9	48.8%	31.5%	77.9%	6.4	1.4	18.3
Joseph Girard III	36	36	32.8	43.0%	41.3%	93.5%	3.2	1.5	15.1
Chase Hunter	36	36	32.8	42.4%	31.1%	85.0%	2.6	3.2	12.9
Ian Schieffelin	36	36	27.5	56.4%	46.9%	73.1%	9.4	2.2	10.9
RJ Godfrey	36	0	15.5	59.4%	42.9%	62.7%	3.4	0.8	6.1
Chauncey Wiggins	36	18	17.7	44.2%	34.9%	71.4%	2.1	0.9	5.4
Alex Hemenway	5	0	15.6	38.1%	42.1%	50.0%	0.6	1.4	5.2
Jack Clark	25	17	23.5	39.8%	30.2%	76.9%	4.9	1.4	4.7
Josh Beadle	32	0	10.8	47.3%	14.3%	68.8%	0.9	0.8	3.0
Dillon Hunter	36	1	14.7	39.3%	25.7%	42.1%	1.6	1.3	2.3
Bas Leyte	20	0	4.5	54.5%	33.3%	40.0%	0.8	0.3	0.8
Andrew Latiff	5	0	1.6	25.0%	0.0%	—	0.8	0.0	0.4
Daniel Nauseef	5	0	1.9	0.0%	0.0%	—	0.6	0.0	0.0
Matt Kelly	5	0	1.8	0.0%	—	—	0.0	0.0	0.0
