= Chase Hunter =

American basketball player (born 2001)

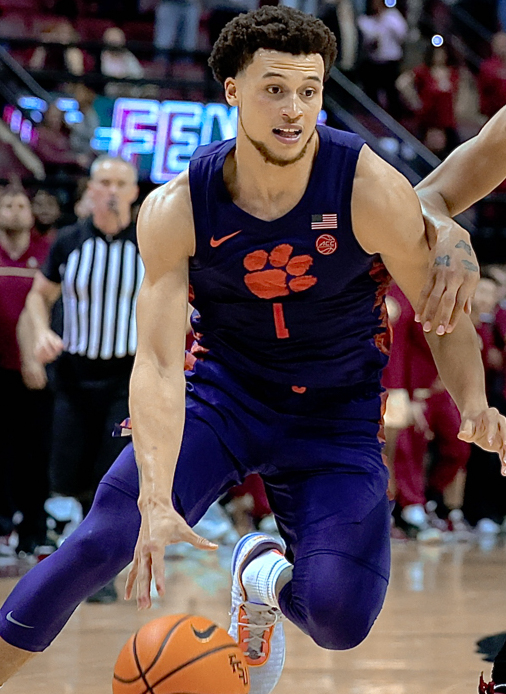
- Hunter with Clemson in 2023

No. 3 – Juventus Utena
- Position: Shooting guard
- League: LKL; BCL

Personal information
- Born: April 8, 2001 (age 25) Atlanta, Georgia, U.S.
- Listed height: 6 ft 4 in (1.93 m)
- Listed weight: 202 lb (92 kg)

Career information
- High school: Westlake (South Fulton, Georgia)
- College: Clemson (2019–2025)
- NBA draft: 2025: undrafted
- Playing career: 2025–present

Career history
- 2025: Birmingham Squadron
- 2026–present: Juventus Utena

Career highlights
- First-team All-ACC (2025)
- Stats at NBA.com
- Stats at Basketball Reference
Medals
Men's basketball
Representing United States
Summer Universiade
Gold medal – first place	2019 Italy	Team competition

Chase Alexander Hunter (born April 8, 2001) is an American professional basketball player for Juventus Utena of the Lithuanian Basketball League (LKL) and the Basketball Champions League (BCL). He played college basketball for the Clemson Tigers.

== High school career ==
Hunter attended Westlake High School in South Fulton, Georgia. Following his high school career, he committed to play college basketball at Clemson University over offers from Georgia, Michigan State, Oklahoma, and Virginia.

== College career ==
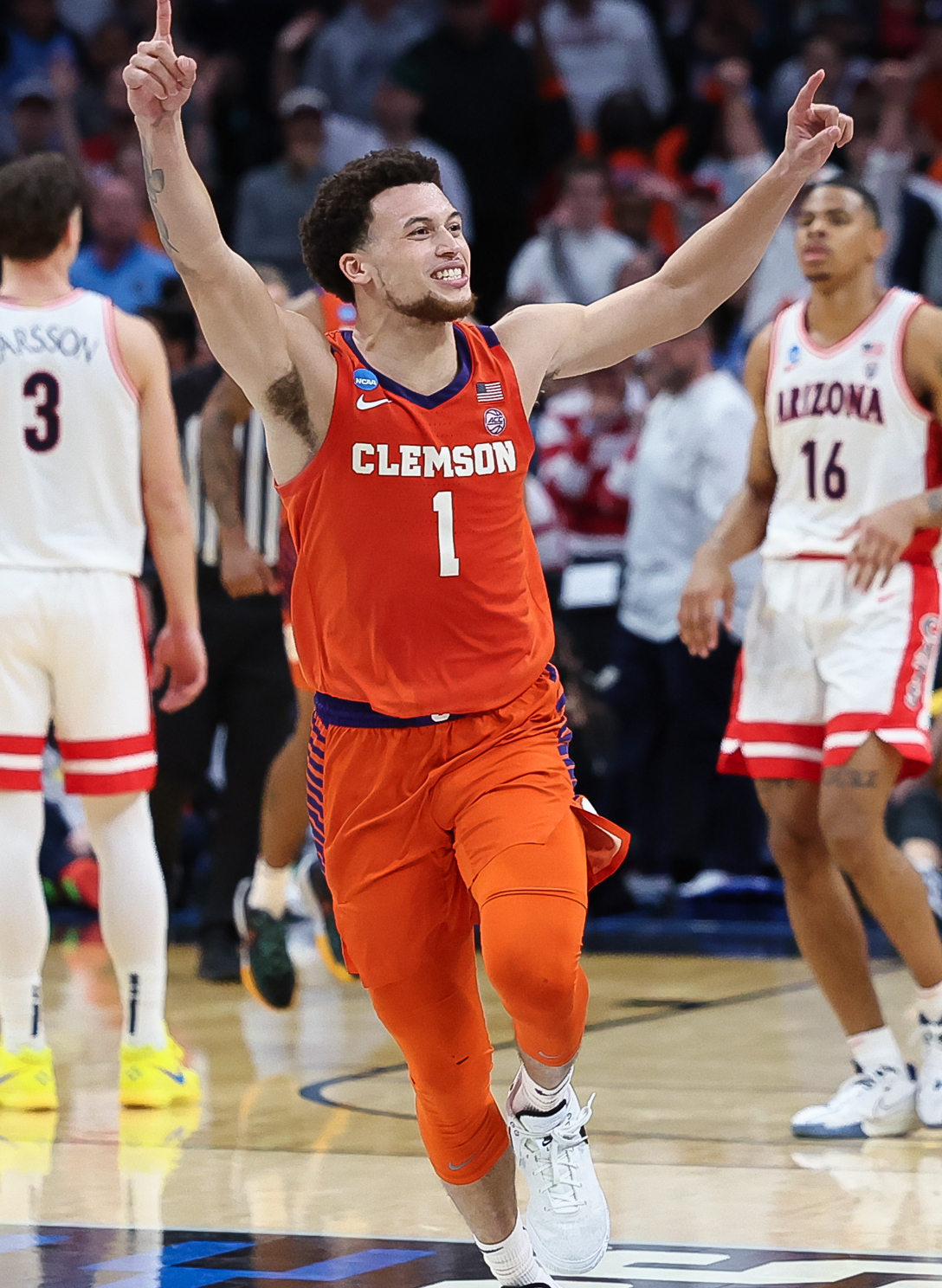
Hunter celebrates a 77–72 victory over Arizona in the Sweet Sixteen. He finished the game with 18 points, seven rebounds, and five assists.

Hunter began his college career dealing with injuries. Hunter began to have a breakout year as a redshirt junior, totaling 23 points and seven assists in the 2022–23 season opener. He finished the season averaging 13.8 points per game, doubling his scoring average from the previous season. The following season, he averaged 12.9 points, 3.2 assists, and 2.6 rebounds per game. During the 2024 NCAA Division I men's basketball tournament, Hunter averaged 17.8 points, 5.8 assists, 4.3 rebounds and two steals across four games, helping lead the Tigers to an Elite Eight appearance. At the conclusion of the 2023–24 season, he entered his name into the NBA draft while retaining his eligibility, eventually electing to return to Clemson for a sixth and final season. In his final season at Clemson, Hunter emerged as the team's leading scorer.

== National team career ==
Hunter was a part of the Clemson team chosen to represent the United States in the 2019 Summer Universiade in Italy.

== Professional career ==
On 16 July 2026, Hunter signed with Juventus Utena of the Lithuanian Basketball League (LKL) and the Basketball Champions League (BCL).

== Career statistics ==
Legend
GP	Games played	GS	Games started	MPG	Minutes per game
FG%	Field goal percentage	3P%	3-point field goal percentage	FT%	Free throw percentage
RPG	Rebounds per game	APG	Assists per game	SPG	Steals per game
BPG	Blocks per game	PPG	Points per game	**Bold**	Career high

=== College ===
Year	Team	GP	GS	MPG	FG%	3P%	FT%	RPG	APG	SPG	BPG	PPG
2019–20	Clemson	9	4	19.3	.378	.304	.636	1.0	1.6	.8	.0	5.3
2020–21	Clemson	24	4	14.1	.311	.143	.667	1.2	.9	.4	.1	2.9
2021–22	Clemson	33	15	22.7	.451	.345	.750	2.7	1.8	.5	.2	6.7
2022–23	Clemson	31	31	32.1	.410	.356	.813	**3.0**	**4.5**	.5	.3	13.8
2023–24	Clemson	**36**	**36**	32.8	.424	.311	.850	2.6	3.2	.7	.3	12.9
2024–25	Clemson	34	33	**33.5**	**.470**	**.407**	**.866**	**3.0**	2.5	**1.4**	**.5**	**16.5**
Career		167	123	27.4	.417	.321	.789	2.5	2.6	.7	.3	10.7

== See also ==
- List of NCAA Division I men's basketball career games played leaders
- List of All-Atlantic Coast Conference men's basketball teams
