= K. C. Rivers =

American basketball player (born 1987)

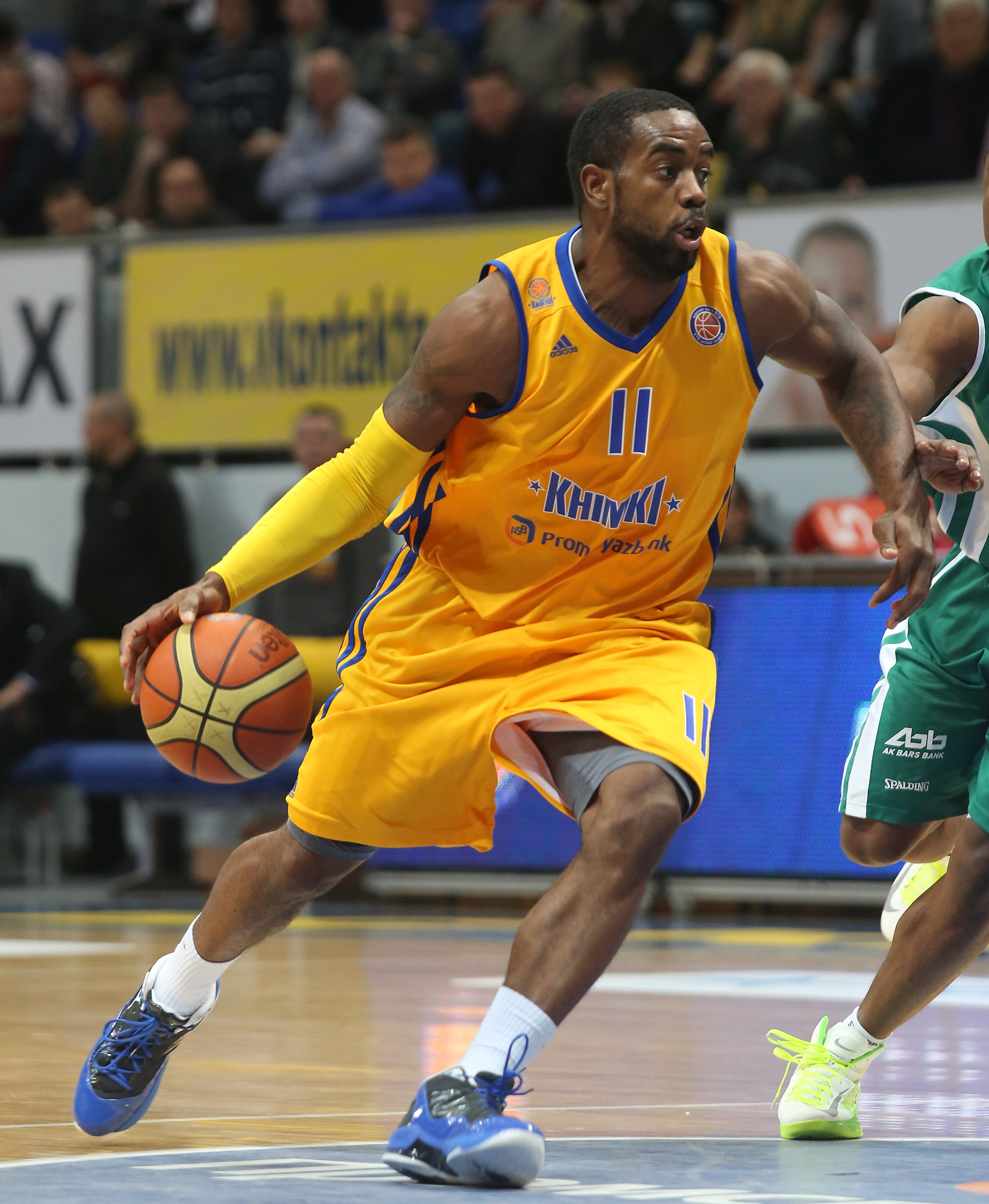
- Rivers with Khimki in 2012

Personal information
- Born: March 1, 1987 (age 39) Charlotte, North Carolina, U.S.
- Listed height: 6 ft 5 in (1.96 m)
- Listed weight: 217 lb (98 kg)

Career information
- High school: Oak Hill Academy (Mouth of Wilson, Virginia)
- College: Clemson (2005–2009)
- NBA draft: 2009: undrafted
- Playing career: 2009–2023
- Position: Shooting guard / small forward

Career history
- 2009: Latina
- 2009–2010: Treviso
- 2010–2011: Chorale Roanne
- 2011: Virtus Bologna
- 2011–2012: Lokomotiv Kuban
- 2012–2013: Khimki
- 2013–2014: Reno Bighorns
- 2014–2015: Real Madrid
- 2015: Bayern Munich
- 2015–2016: Real Madrid
- 2016–2018: Panathinaikos
- 2018–2019: Reggiana
- 2019: Crvena zvezda
- 2019: Real Betis
- 2019–2020: Žalgiris Kaunas
- 2020–2021: Zenit Saint Petersburg
- 2021–2022: Bayern Munich
- 2022: Hapoel Jerusalem
- 2022–2023: BC Samara
- 2023: Fuerza Regia

Career highlights
- EuroLeague champion (2015); 2× Spanish League champion (2015, 2016); Serbian League champion (2019); 2× Spanish Cup winner (2015, 2016); Spanish Supercup winner (2014); 2× Greek League champion (2017, 2018); All-Greek League Second Team (2017); Greek Cup winner (2017); Adriatic League champion (2019); King Mindaugas Cup winner (2020); LKL champion (2020); Second-team All-ACC (2008); Honorable Mention All-ACC (2009)

Kelvin Creswell Rivers (born March 1, 1987) is a former American professional basketball player who last played for Fuerza Regia of the LNBP. Standing at 6 ft 5 in (1.96 m), he played at the shooting guard and small forward positions.

== High school career ==
Rivers attended high school at Oak Hill Academy, in Mouth of Wilson, Virginia, where he played high school basketball. While there, he helped his team capture two USA Today national high school basketball championships. In those two years, his team's record was a combined 72–2. He holds Oak Hill's record for the most three-point field goals made in a game, with 15.

== College career ==
Rivers played college basketball at Clemson University, with the Clemson Tigers, seeing action in 102 games, while starting 55 of those games. Rivers averaged 14.2 points, and grabbed 6 rebounds a game, in his four years at Clemson.

== Professional career ==
After failing to be drafted in the 2009 NBA draft, Rivers signed with AB Latina of the Italian LegaDue Basket, the Italian second-tier league, in August 2009. In 10 games with Latina, he averaged 24.5 points and 5.7 rebounds per game, and in December 2009, he signed with Benetton Treviso of the Italian top-tier league, the LBA, for the remainder of the season.

On June 30, 2010, he signed a contract with Chorale Roanne of the French LNB Pro A for the 2010–11 season. In January 2011, he returned to Italy and signed with Virtus Bologna, for the rest of the season.

On July 29, 2011, he signed a one-year deal with Lokomotiv Kuban of Russia. On May 30, 2012, he signed a two-year deal with another Russian team, Khimki Moscow Region. In July 2013, he parted ways with Khimki.

In November 2013, he was acquired by the Reno Bighorns of the NBA D-League. In 47 games played in the D-league, he averaged 15.8 points and 4 rebounds per game, during the 2013–14 season.

On August 7, 2014, he signed a one-year deal with the Spanish club Real Madrid. In the 2014–15 season, Real Madrid continued its successes in the EuroLeague from the previous seasons, advancing to the EuroLeague Final Four for the third straight time. In the semifinal game against Fenerbahçe Ülker, Rivers helped his team to secure its third straight EuroLeague Finals appearance, by scoring 17 points, on 5 of 6 shooting from the three-point line, in a 96–87 win. Real Madrid eventually won the EuroLeague championship, after defeating Olympiacos in the EuroLeague Final, by a score of 78–59. Over the season, Rivers averaged 5.3 points, 2.3 rebounds, and 1.1 assists per game, to help his team win its ninth EuroLeague title overall, and its first in 20 years. Real Madrid eventually finished the season by also winning the Spanish League championship, after a 3–0 series sweep in the Spanish League Finals series against Barcelona. With the Spanish League title, they won the triple crown.

On September 8, 2015, Rivers signed a one-year contract with the German club Bayern Munich. On December 22, 2015, he left Bayern, and returned to his former club, Real Madrid, for the rest of the season.

On July 24, 2016, Rivers signed a 1+1 deal with the Greek club Panathinaikos.

On December 7, 2018, Rivers signed a deal with the Italian club Pallacanestro Reggiana. He parted ways with Reggiana in February 2019.

On February 11, 2019, Rivers signed for Serbian club Crvena zvezda for the rest of the 2018–19 season. On August 20, 2019, Rivers signed a one-year deal with Spanish club Coosur Real Betis.

On November 22, 2019, Rivers signed with Lithuanian club Žalgiris Kaunas for the remainder of the 2019–2020 season.

On July 6, 2020, Rivers signed with BC Zenit Saint Petersburg for the 2020–2021 season. On July 9, 2021, Rivers officially parted ways with the Russian club. On December 10, he returned to Bayern Munich. Rivers parted ways with the team on January 25, 2022.

On February 22, 2022, Rivers signed with Hapoel Jerusalem B.C. in Israel.

On August 3, 2022, Rivers signed with BC Samara of the VTB United League.

On October 21, 2023, Rivers signed with BC Fuerza Regia of the LNBP League.

== Career statistics ==
Legend
GP	Games played	GS	Games started	MPG	Minutes per game
FG%	Field-goal percentage	3P%	3-point field-goal percentage	FT%	Free-throw percentage
RPG	Rebounds per game	APG	Assists per game	SPG	Steals per game
BPG	Blocks per game	PPG	Points per game	PIR	Performance index rating
**Bold**	Career high

=== EuroLeague ===
†	Denotes seasons in which Rivers won the EuroLeague
*	Led the league

Year	Team	GP	GS	MPG	FG%	3P%	FT%	RPG	APG	SPG	BPG	PPG	PIR
2012–13	Khimki	24	**17**	26.3	.445	.364	.533	**2.7**	**1.5**	.8	**.1**	9.6	7.5
2014–15†	Real Madrid	30*	16	17.0	.432	.411	**1.000**	2.3	1.1	.6	—	5.3	5.1
2015–16	Bayern Munich	10	2	23.5	.442	**.431**	.667	2.3	1.3	.5	**.1**	10.8	**8.0**
2015–16	Real Madrid	17	4	17.5	.437	.315	.778	1.5	.8	.8	**.1**	6.7	5.7
2016–17	Panathinaikos	33	5	**27.4**	**.449**	.420	.780	2.5	.8	.8	**.1**	**11.2**	7.7
2017–18	Panathinaikos	31	4	23.4	.409	.358	.656	**2.7**	.8	**1.1**	**.1**	8.5	6.5
2019–20	Žalgiris	18	8	21.4	.444	.412	.900	1.5	1.1	.9	—	9.3	6.7
2020-21	Zenit	**37**	13	22.3	.400	.355	.455	2.5	.7	.5	**.1**	6.1	4.5
2021–22	Bayern Munich	6	1	16.2	.395	.313	.667	1.3	1.0	.3	—	6.2	3.3
Career		206	70	22.4	.431	.382	.696	2.3	1.0	.7	.1	8.1	6.2

=== Domestic leagues ===
Season	Team	League	GP	MPG	FG%	3P%	FT%	RPG	APG	SPG	BPG	PPG
2009–10	Latina Basket	LegaDue	12	38.1	.477	.371	.767	5.7	1.2	1.8	.1	24.5
2009–10	Benetton Basket	LBA	23	30.2	.489	.442	.825	4.3	1.3	1.5	.2	12.3
2010–11	Chorale Roanne Basket	LNB Pro A	14	29.7	.523	.360	.714	4.6	1.9	1.0	.1	14.3
2010–11	Canadian Solar Bologna	LBA	17	31.8	.432	.580	.811	4.4	1.6	1.9	.2	17.2
2011–12	PBC Lokomotiv-Kuban	Russian PBL	17	24.4	.513	.431	.750	4.4	.9	.9	.0	11.4
2011–12	PBC Lokomotiv-Kuban	VTB United League	19	27.1	.481	.402	.806	4.3	1.0	1.2	.0	11.2
2012–13	BC Khimki	Russian PBL	13	18.5	.487	.413	.789	2.5	1.1	.8	.2	8.5
2012–13	BC Khimki	VTB United League	24	20.0	.480	.494	.571	2.2	1.4	0.9	.0	8.6
2013–14	Reno Bighorns	D-League	47	30.7	.510	.352	.852	4.0	2.2	1.3	0.1	15.8
2014–15	Real Madrid	Liga ACB	42	17.7	.600	.393	.833	1.9	.8	.6	.1	5.7
2015	Bayern Munich	Basketball Bundesliga	13	24.3	.512	.442	.833	3.4	2.2	1.0	0.4	15.0
2015–16	Real Madrid	Liga ACB	10	?	.559	.536	.571	2.7	2.0	0.8	0.1	8.7
2016–17	Panathinaikos	GBL	32	21,3	.458	.416	.620	2.3	0.9	1.1	0.3	8.9

== Personal life ==
Rivers is the nephew of former NBA player Byron Dinkins. Rivers is divorced, and has 2 children, Maiyah and Micah.
