= Sharone Wright =

American basketball player (born 1973)

Personal information
- Born: January 30, 1973 (age 53) Macon, Georgia, U.S.
- Listed height: 6 ft 11 in (2.11 m)
- Listed weight: 260 lb (118 kg)

Career information
- High school: Southwest (Macon, Georgia)
- College: Clemson (1991–1994)
- NBA draft: 1994: 1st round, 6th overall pick
- Drafted by: Philadelphia 76ers
- Playing career: 1994–2008
- Position: Center
- Number: 4, 9, 13

Career history
- 1994–1996: Philadelphia 76ers
- 1996–1998: Toronto Raptors
- 2002–2003: Hong Kong Flying Dragons
- 2003: Ourense
- 2003–2004: Anwil Włocławek
- 2004–2005: Fórum Filatélico
- 2005–2006: Jeonju KCC Egis
- 2006: Yakama Sun Kings
- 2006–2007: EiffelTowers
- 2008: Jiangsu Dragons
- 2008: EiffelTowers

Career highlights
- NBA All-Rookie Second Team (1995); Second-team All-ACC (1994); Third-team All-ACC (1993); Second-team Parade All-American (1991); McDonald's All-American (1991)

Career NBA statistics
- Points: 1974 (9.7 ppg)
- Rebounds: 1023 (5.0 rpg)
- Assists: 118 (0.6 apg)
- Stats at NBA.com
- Stats at Basketball Reference
Medals
Men's basketball
Representing United States
Summer Universiade
Gold medal – first place	1993 Buffalo	National team

Sharone Addaryl Wright (born January 30, 1973) is an American former professional basketball player.

Born in Macon, Georgia, he played collegiately at Clemson University from 1991 until 1994.

Wright was selected 6th overall in the 1994 NBA draft by the Philadelphia 76ers. He played four NBA seasons with the 76ers and Toronto Raptors. His best year as a professional came during his rookie season with the 76ers when he appeared in 79 games and averaged 11.4 points and 6 rebounds per game. He was named to the NBA All-Rookie Second Team.

While still a member of the Raptors, Wright's NBA career was cut short by a car accident in Macon, Georgia in which he suffered multiple injuries, including broken arms and collarbone. In 203 career games, he averaged 9.7 points (from .456 FG and .618 FT), 5.0 rebounds and 1.6 blocks in 22.3 minutes per game. Isiah Thomas has high hopes for a Marcus Camby and Wright front-court along with Damon Stoudamire and Doug Christie in the backcourt .

He also played professionally in Spain, Poland, South Korea as well as in the Netherlands with the EiffelTowers, where he won the Dutch title as a player and also the Dutch cup. He also won the game against Real Madrid

Wright later became a coach for HOOP-CAMPS in Europe.

== Coaching career ==
Wright currently coaches in South Carolina with the private coaching service, CoachUp. Wright's son Nico plays basketball at Benjamin Franklin High School in Queen Creek, Arizona.
