= PJ Hall =

American basketball player (born 2002)

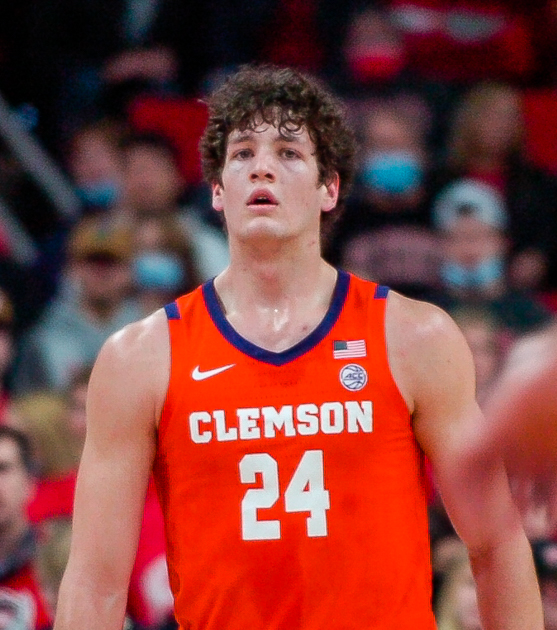
- Hall with Clemson in 2022

No. 16 – Charlotte Hornets
- Position: Center
- League: NBA

Personal information
- Born: February 21, 2002 (age 24) Spartanburg, South Carolina, U.S.
- Listed height: 6 ft 9 in (2.06 m)
- Listed weight: 245 lb (111 kg)

Career information
- High school: Dorman (Roebuck, South Carolina)
- College: Clemson (2020–2024)
- NBA draft: 2024: undrafted
- Playing career: 2024–present

Career history
- 2024–2025: Denver Nuggets
- 2024–2025: →Grand Rapids Gold
- 2025: Memphis Grizzlies
- 2025: →Memphis Hustle
- 2025: Greensboro Swarm
- 2025–present: Charlotte Hornets
- 2025–present: →Greensboro Swarm

Career highlights
- NBA G League champion (2026); All-NBA G League Third Team (2026); First-team All-ACC (2024); Third-team All-ACC (2023)
- Stats at NBA.com
- Stats at Basketball Reference

Paul Jerome Hall (born February 21, 2002) is an American basketball player for the Charlotte Hornets of the National Basketball Association (NBA), on a two-way contract with the Greensboro Swarm of the NBA G League. He played college basketball for the Clemson Tigers.

== Early life and high school career ==
Hall, a center from Spartanburg, South Carolina, committed to Clemson out of Dorman High School as the top recruit in South Carolina and state player of the year.

== College career ==
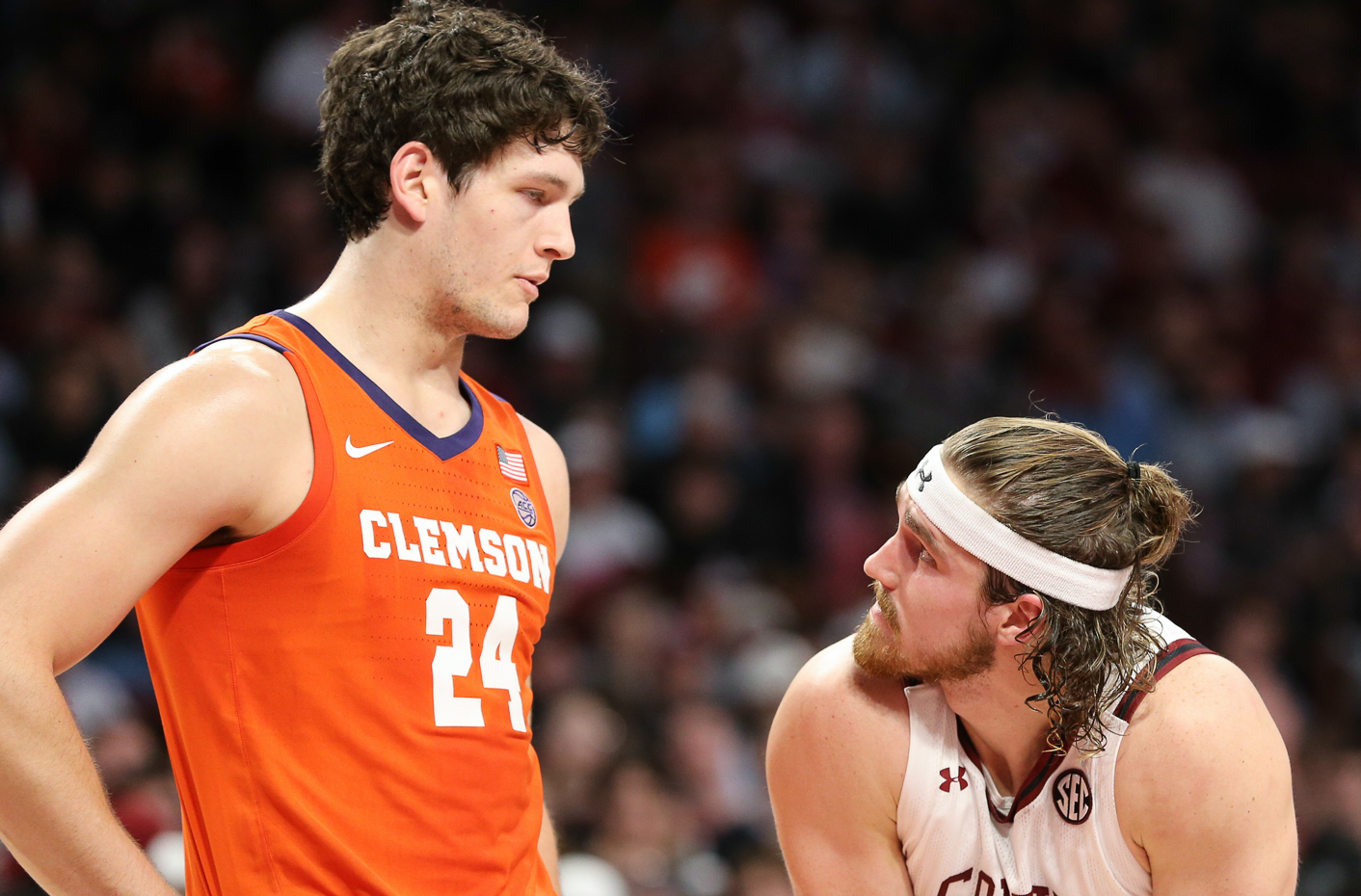
Hall against Hayden Brown in 2022

Hall was a reserve as a freshman, then entered the starting lineup his sophomore season, raising his scoring average from 3.5 to 15.5 points per game. As a junior, he averaged 15.3 points and 5.7 rebounds and was named third-team All-Atlantic Coast Conference. Following the season, Hall declared for the 2023 NBA draft, but maintained his eligibility to keep the option of returning to college. Ultimately he chose to return to Clemson, despite earning an invitation to the NBA draft combine.

To start the 2023–24 season, Hall was named to the preseason All-ACC team and included in the Wooden Award and Kareem Abdul-Jabbar Award watch lists. On December 5, he was named the ACC Player of the Week after averaging 21.5 points and 9.5 rebounds in wins over Alabama and Pittsburgh. Hall averaged 18.3 points, 6.4 rebounds, 1.4 assists, and 1.4 blocks per game.

== Professional career ==
=== Denver Nuggets / Grand Rapids Gold (2024–2025) ===
After going undrafted in the 2024 NBA draft, Hall joined the Denver Nuggets for the 2024 NBA Summer League and on July 10, 2024, he signed a two-way contract with the team. He made 19 appearances for Denver during the 2024–25 NBA season, averaging 1.7 points, 1.2 rebounds, and 0.2 assists.

=== Memphis Grizzlies / Hustle (2025) ===
On July 21, 2025, Hall signed a two-way contract with the Memphis Grizzlies. He appeared in seven games for the Grizzlies, averaging 1.9 points, 1.3 rebounds, and 0.3 assists. Hall was waived by Memphis following the signing of Jahmai Mashack on November 16.

=== Charlotte Hornets / Greensboro Swarm (2025–present) ===
On December 24, 2025, Hall signed a two-way contract with the Charlotte Hornets. He made 12 appearances (including two starts) for the Hornets during the 2025–26 season, recording averages of 6.1 points, 5.5 rebounds, and 0.7 assists (all career-highs). On April 9, 2026, Hall was ruled out for the remainder of the season after undergoing surgery to repair a right ankle fracture he had suffered playing for the Greensboro Swarm of the NBA G League.

== Career statistics ==
Legend
GP	Games played	GS	Games started	MPG	Minutes per game
FG%	Field goal percentage	3P%	3-point field goal percentage	FT%	Free throw percentage
RPG	Rebounds per game	APG	Assists per game	SPG	Steals per game
BPG	Blocks per game	PPG	Points per game	**Bold**	Career high

=== NBA ===
Year	Team	GP	GS	MPG	FG%	3P%	FT%	RPG	APG	SPG	BPG	PPG
2024–25	Denver	**19**	0	3.5	**.583**	.250	.750	1.2	.2	.0	.2	1.7
2025–26	Memphis	7	0	11.2	.508	.600	.793	3.9	.5	.2	.5	4.5
2025–26	Charlotte	12	**2**	**15.6**	.500	**1.000**	**.808**	**5.5**	**.7**	**.3**	**.7**	**6.1**
Career		38	2	7.3	.530	.385	.788	2.6	.4	.1	.4	3.1

=== College ===
Year	Team	GP	GS	MPG	FG%	3P%	FT%	RPG	APG	SPG	BPG	PPG
2020–21	Clemson	21	0	10.0	.492	.133	.750	2.0	.1	.2	.2	3.5
2021–22	Clemson	30	29	27.6	.493	.308	.781	5.8	**1.6**	.5	1.3	15.5
2022–23	Clemson	33	27	24.6	**.535**	**.398**	**.786**	5.7	1.0	.7	1.1	15.3
2023–24	Clemson	**36**	**36**	**28.9**	.488	.315	.779	**6.4**	1.4	**.8**	**1.4**	**18.3**
Career		120	92	24.1	.503	.326	.780	5.3	1.1	.6	1.1	14.2

== See also ==
- List of All-Atlantic Coast Conference men's basketball teams
