= Devin Gray (basketball) =

American basketball player

Personal information
- Born: May 31, 1972 Baltimore, Maryland, U.S.
- Died: August 17, 2013 (aged 41) Atlanta, Georgia, U.S.
- Listed height: 6 ft 7 in (2.01 m)
- Listed weight: 240 lb (109 kg)

Career information
- High school: Saint Frances Academy (Baltimore, Maryland)
- College: Clemson (1991–1995)
- NBA draft: 1995: undrafted
- Playing career: 1995–2001
- Position: Small forward
- Number: 45, 4, 9

Career history
- 1995–1996: Sioux Falls Skyforce
- 1996–1997: Sacramento Kings
- 1997: San Antonio Spurs
- 1997: Sioux Falls Skyforce
- 1997: Caja San Fernando
- 1997–1998: Fórum Valladolid
- 1998–1999: Sioux Falls Skyforce
- 1999: Yakima Sun Kings
- 1999–2000: Houston Rockets
- 2000–2001: Marinos de Oriente

Career highlights
- CBA champion (1996); CBA All-Rookie First Team (1996); Third-team All-ACC (1994)
- Stats at NBA.com
- Stats at Basketball Reference

Devin Antoine Gray (May 31, 1972 – August 17, 2013) was an American professional basketball player. He played parts of three seasons in the National Basketball Association (NBA) for the Sacramento Kings, San Antonio Spurs and Houston Rockets and played in Spain's first division. He played college basketball for the Clemson Tigers.

Gray played in the Continental Basketball Association (CBA) for the Sioux Falls Skyforce from 1995 to 1997 and during the 1998–99 season and the Yakima Sun Kings during the 1999–2000 season. He won a CBA championship with the Skyforce in 1996. He was selected to the CBA All-Rookie First Team.

Gray died of a heart attack on August 17, 2013, in Atlanta, Georgia.
