= Stan Rome =

American football player (born 1956)

No. 87, 89
- Position: Wide receiver

Personal information
- Born: June 4, 1956 (age 70); Valdosta, Georgia, U.S.
- Listed height: 6 ft 5 in (1.96 m)
- Listed weight: 212 lb (96 kg)

Career information
- High school: Valdosta
- College: Clemson
- NFL draft: 1979: 11th round, 277th overall pick

Career history
- Kansas City Chiefs (1979–1982); Washington Federals (1983)

Career NFL statistics
- Receptions: 22
- Receiving yards: 286
- Touchdowns: 1
- Stats at Pro Football Reference

Stanford Bernard Rome (born June 4, 1956) is an American former professional football player who was a wide receiver for the Kansas City Chiefs of the National Football League (NFL). He played college football for the Clemson Tigers and was selected by the Chiefs in the 11th round of the 1979 NFL draft.

Rome also played college basketball at Clemson and was selected by the Cleveland Cavaliers in the fourth round of the 1978 NBA draft.

== Personal life ==
His son, Brandon Frye, played college football for the Virginia Tech Hokies and played in the NFL from 2007 to 2009. Another son, Jay Rome, plays college football for the Georgia Bulldogs.
