= 2023–24 Oklahoma State Cowboys basketball team =

American college basketball season

2023–24 Oklahoma State Cowboys basketball
- Conference: Big 12 Conference
- Record: 12–20 (4–14 Big 12)
- Head coach: Mike Boynton (7th season)
- Associate head coach: Terrence Rencher
- Assistant coaches: David Cason; Keiton Page; Scott Sutton; James Barrett
- Home arena: Gallagher-Iba Arena

2023–24 Big 12 men's basketball standings
	Conf.				Overall
Team	W		L	PCT	W		L	PCT
No. 3т Houston	15	–	3	.833	32	–	5	.865
No. 8 Iowa State †	13	–	5	.722	29	–	8	.784
No. 16 Baylor	11	–	7	.611	24	–	11	.686
Texas Tech	11	–	7	.611	23	–	11	.676
BYU	10	–	8	.556	23	–	11	.676
No. 19 Kansas	10	–	8	.556	23	–	11	.676
Texas	9	–	9	.500	21	–	13	.618
TCU	9	–	9	.500	21	–	13	.618
Oklahoma	8	–	10	.444	20	–	12	.625
Kansas State	8	–	10	.444	19	–	15	.559
Cincinnati	7	–	11	.389	22	–	15	.595
UCF	7	–	11	.389	17	–	16	.515
Oklahoma State	4	–	14	.222	12	–	20	.375
West Virginia	4	–	14	.222	9	–	23	.281
† 2024 Big 12 tournament winner Rankings from AP poll

The 2023–24 Oklahoma State Cowboys basketball team represented Oklahoma State University during the 2023–24 NCAA Division I men's basketball season. The team was led by seventh-year head coach Mike Boynton, and played their home games at Gallagher-Iba Arena in Stillwater, Oklahoma as a member of the Big 12 Conference.

== Previous season ==
The Cowboys finished the 2022–23 season 17–14, 8–10 in Big 12 play to finish in seventh place. They defeated Oklahoma in the first round of the Big 12 tournament before losing in the quarterfinals to Texas. They were invited to the National Invitation Tournament, where they defeated Youngstown State and Eastern Washington before losing in overtime in the quarterfinals to North Texas.

== Offseason ==
=== Departures ===
Name	Number	Pos.	Height	Weight	Year	Hometown	Reason for departure
Russell Harrison	24	G/F	6'5"	182	Graduate	Lubbock, TX	Graduated
Caleb Asberry	5	G	6'3"	165	RS senior	Pflugerville, TX	Graduated
Avery Anderson III	0	G	6'3"	158	Senior	Justin, TX	Graduate transferred to TCU
Chris Harris Jr.	2	G	6'2"	233	Senior	Dallas, TX	Graduate transferred
Kalib Boone	22	F	6'9"	198	Senior	Tulsa, OK	Graduate transferred to UNLV
Bernard Kouma	25	F	6'10"	240	Senior	N'Djamena, Chad	Graduated
Tyreek Smith	23	F	6'7"	217	RS junior	Baton Rouge, LA	Transferred to SMU
Woody Newton	4	F	6'9"	195	Junior	District Heights, MD	Transferred to George Mason
Moussa Cissé	33	F	7'1"	216	Junior	Conakry, Guinea	Transferred to Ole Miss

=== Incoming transfers ===
Name	Number	Pos.	Height	Weight	Year	Hometown	Previous school
Jarius Hicklen	4	G	6'4"	180	Graduate	Dallas, TX	North Florida
Mike Marsh	32	C	6'10"	250	RS senior	Columbia, SC	Jacksonville
Javon Small	12	G	6'3"	195	Junior	South Bend, IN	East Carolina
Isaiah Miranda	24	F/C	7'1"	220	RS freshman	Pawtucket, RI	NC State

=== Recruiting classes ===
==== 2023 recruiting class ====
College recruiting
Name	Hometown	School	Height	Weight	Commit date
Brandon Garrison #7 C	Oklahoma City, OK	Del City HS	6 ft 11 in (2.11 m)	245 lb (111 kg)	Jul 7, 2022
Brandon Garrison #7 C	Recruit ratings: Rivals: 247Sports: ESPN: (87)				
Jamyron Keller #17 CG	St. Matthews, SC	Ellison HS (TX)	6 ft 3 in (1.91 m)	210 lb (95 kg)	Aug 14, 2022
Jamyron Keller #17 CG	Recruit ratings: Rivals: 247Sports: ESPN: (81)				
Connor Dow #74 SF	Broken Arrow, OK	Broken Arrow HS	6 ft 6 in (1.98 m)	200 lb (91 kg)	Sep 10, 2022
Connor Dow #74 SF	Recruit ratings: Rivals: 247Sports: ESPN: (77)				
Justin McBride #29 PF	Plano, TX	Plano HS	6 ft 8 in (2.03 m)	230 lb (100 kg)	Sep 21, 2022
Justin McBride #29 PF	Recruit ratings: Rivals: 247Sports: ESPN: (82)				
Eric Dailey Jr. #9 PF	Palmetto, FL	IMG Academy	6 ft 8 in (2.03 m)	230 lb (100 kg)	Jan 11, 2023
Eric Dailey Jr. #9 PF	Recruit ratings: Rivals: 247Sports: ESPN: (85)				
Overall recruit ranking:
Note: In many cases, Scout, Rivals, 247Sports, On3, and ESPN may conflict in their listings of height and weight.; In these cases, the average was taken. ESPN grades are on a 100-point scale.; Sources: "2023 Team Ranking". Rivals.

== Roster ==
2023–24 Oklahoma State Cowboys men's basketball team
Players
Coaches

Pos.	#	Name	Height	Weight	Year	Previous school	Hometown
G	0	Naz Brown (W)	6 ft 0 in (1.83 m)	181 lb (82 kg)	So	Coppell HS	Fort Worth, TX
G	1	Bryce Thompson	6 ft 6 in (1.98 m)	205 lb (93 kg)	Sr	Booker T. Washington HS; Kansas	Tulsa, OK
F	2	Eric Dailey Jr.	6 ft 8 in (2.03 m)	230 lb (104 kg)	Fr	IMG Academy	Palmetto, FL
G	4	Jarius Hicklen	6 ft 4 in (1.93 m)	180 lb (82 kg)	GS	DeSoto HS; Oklahoma Baptist; North Florida	Dallas, TX
G	5	Quion Williams	6 ft 5 in (1.96 m)	220 lb (100 kg)	So	Jonesboro HS	Jonesboro, AR
G	12	Javon Small	6 ft 3 in (1.91 m)	195 lb (88 kg)	Jr	Compass Prep; East Carolina	South Bend, IN
G	13	Connor Dow	6 ft 6 in (1.98 m)	200 lb (91 kg)	Fr	Broken Arrow HS	Broken Arrow, OK
G	14	Jamyron Keller	6 ft 3 in (1.91 m)	210 lb (95 kg)	Fr	Ellison HS (TX)	St. Matthews, SC
G	15	Carson Sager (W)	6 ft 4 in (1.93 m)	207 lb (94 kg)	Sr	Rider HS	Wichita Falls, TX
F	21	Justin McBride	6 ft 8 in (2.03 m)	230 lb (104 kg)	Fr	Plano HS	Plano, TX
G	22	Brooks Manzer (W)	6 ft 3 in (1.91 m)	190 lb (86 kg)	Jr	Edmond Memorial HS	Edmond, OK
C	23	Brandon Garrison	6 ft 11 in (2.11 m)	245 lb (111 kg)	Fr	Del City HS	Oklahoma City, OK
F/C	24	Isaiah Miranda	7 ft 1 in (2.16 m)	220 lb (100 kg)	RS Fr	Southern California Academy; NC State	Pawtucket, RI
C	32	Mike Marsh	6 ft 10 in (2.08 m)	250 lb (113 kg)	RS Sr	Gray Collegiate; Dodge City CC; Jacksonville	Columbia, SC
G	35	Weston Church (W)	6 ft 3 in (1.91 m)	180 lb (82 kg)	Sr	Fairview HS	Fairview, OK
G	51	John-Michael Wright	6 ft 1 in (1.85 m)	190 lb (86 kg)	GS	Fayetteville Academy; High Point	Fayetteville, NC

Head coach

- Mike Boynton Jr. (South Carolina)

Assistant coach(es)

- Terrence Rencher (Texas)
- David Cason (Illinois State)
- Keiton Page (Oklahoma State)
- Scott Sutton (Oklahoma State)
- James Barrett (Sam Houston State)

Legend

- (C) Team captain
- (S) Suspended
- (I) Ineligible
- (W) Walk-on
- Injured
- Current redshirt

Roster

== Schedule and results ==
Date time, TV	Rank^{#}	Opponent^{#}	Result	Record	High points	High rebounds	High assists	Site (attendance) city, state
Exhibition
November 1, 2023*; 7:00 p.m., ESPN+		Oklahoma Baptist	W 95–53	–	19 – McBride	11 – Garrison	3 – Tied	Gallagher-Iba Arena (4,731); Stillwater, OK
Non-conference regular season
November 6, 2023*; 8:00 p.m., ESPN+		Abilene Christian	L 59–64	0–1	19 – Thompson	10 – Williams	4 – Tied	Gallagher-Iba Arena (5,084); Stillwater, OK
November 12, 2023*; 2:00 p.m., ESPN+		Sam Houston	W 85–70	1–1	17 – Thompson	8 – Garrison	5 – Small	Gallagher-Iba Arena (5,843); Stillwater, OK
November 16, 2023*; 5:30 p.m., ESPNU		vs. St. Bonaventure; Legends Classic semifinals	L 64–66	1–2	15 – Dailey	6 – Tied	7 – Small	Barclays Center (–); Brooklyn, NY
November 17, 2023*; 3:30 p.m., ESPNU		vs. Notre Dame; Legends Classic consolation game	L 64–66 ^{OT}	1–3	29 – Small	11 – Williams	3 – Williams	Barclays Center (–); Brooklyn, NY
November 20, 2023*; 7:00 p.m., ESPN+		New Orleans	W 96–68	2–3	18 – Keller	11 – Marsh	6 – Small	Gallagher-Iba Arena (5,907); Stillwater, OK
November 24, 2023*; 7:00 p.m., ESPN+		Houston Christian	W 92–65	3–3	14 – Marsh	6 – Dailey Jr.	8 – Small	Gallagher-Iba Arena (6,153); Stillwater, OK
November 30, 2023*; 8:00 p.m., ESPN2		No. 15 Creighton; Big East–Big 12 Battle	L 65–79	3–4	24 – Small	11 – Dailey Jr.	4 – Small	Gallagher-Iba Arena (6,309); Stillwater, OK
December 5, 2023*; 8:00 p.m., CBSSN		at Southern Illinois	L 68–70	3–5	25 – Small	10 – Tied	4 – Small	Banterra Center (5,610); Carbondale, IL
December 10, 2023*; 5:30 p.m., ESPNU		vs. Tulsa	W 72–57	4–5	18 – Small	7 – Tied	4 – Williams	Paycom Center (–); Oklahoma City, OK
December 17, 2023*; 4:00 p.m., ESPN+		Oral Roberts	W 81–60	5–5	13 – Tied	11 – Dailey Jr.	8 – Small	Gallagher-Iba Arena (6,170); Stillwater, OK
December 20, 2023*; 7:00 p.m., ESPN+		Wofford	W 76–70	6–5	19 – Thompson	7 – Williams	7 – Williams	Gallagher-Iba Arena (5,637); Stillwater, OK
December 31, 2023*; 2:00 p.m., ESPN+		South Carolina State	W 86–70	7–5	17 – Thompson	10 – Tied	5 – Small	Gallagher-Iba Arena (7,210); Stillwater, OK
January 3, 2024*; 6:00 p.m., ESPN+		Chicago State	W 72–53	8–5	13 – Thompson	9 – Dailey Jr.	3 – Tied	Gallagher-Iba Arena (5,142); Stillwater, OK
Big 12 regular season
January 6, 2024; 6:00 p.m., ESPN+		No. 18 Baylor	L 70–75 ^{OT}	8–6 (0–1)	20 – Garrison	8 – Tied	2 – Tied	Gallagher-Iba Arena (6,513); Stillwater, OK
January 9, 2024; 7:00 p.m., ESPN+		at Texas Tech	L 73–90	8–7 (0–2)	17 – Thompson	6 – Williams	2 – Tied	United Supermarkets Arena (14,362); Lubbock, TX
January 13, 2024; 7:15 p.m., ESPN+		at Iowa State	L 42–66	8–8 (0–3)	12 – Dailey Jr.	8 – Garrison	4 – Williams	Hilton Coliseum (14,267); Ames, IA
January 16, 2024; 8:00 p.m., ESPN		No. 3 Kansas	L 66–90	8–9 (0–4)	20 – Thompson	5 – Tied	7 – Small	Gallagher-Iba Arena (8,570); Stillwater, OK
January 20, 2024; 6:00 p.m., ESPN+		at Kansas State	L 66–70	8–10 (0–5)	15 – Dailey	8 – Small	5 – Small	Bramlage Coliseum (10,247); Manhattan, KS
January 23, 2024; 8:00 p.m., ESPN2		TCU	L 69–74	8–11 (0–6)	16 – Wright	5 – Small	7 – Small	Gallagher-Iba Arena (6,017); Stillwater, OK
January 27, 2024; 1:00 p.m., ESPN+		West Virginia	W 70–66	9–11 (1–6)	20 – Garrison	12 – Small	7 – Small	Gallagher-Iba Arena (6,889); Stillwater, OK
January 30, 2024; 8:00 p.m., ESPN		at No. 8 Kansas	L 54–83	9–12 (1–7)	16 – Wright	7 – Dow	2 – Tied	Allen Fieldhouse (16,300); Lawrence, KS
February 3, 2024; 1:00 p.m., ESPN+		Kansas State	W 75–72	10–12 (2–7)	18 – Small	10 – Williams	7 – Small	Gallagher-Iba Arena (7,623); Stillwater, OK
February 6, 2024; 6:00 p.m., ESPN2		at No. 5 Houston	L 63–79	10–13 (2–8)	18 – Small	7 – Garrison	2 – Small	Fertitta Center (7,205); Houston, TX
February 10, 2024; 6:00 p.m., ESPN+		at Oklahoma; Bedlam Series	L 62–66	10–14 (2–9)	17 – Small	10 – Williams	3 – Small	Lloyd Noble Center (11,456); Stillwater, OK
February 17, 2024; 1:00 p.m., ESPN+		No. 19 BYU	W 93–83	11–14 (3–9)	22 – Keller	5 – Tied	6 – Small	Gallagher-Iba Arena (7,360); Stillwater, OK
February 21, 2024; 6:00 p.m., ESPN+		at Cincinnati	W 80–76	12–14 (4–9)	19 – Small	8 – Williams	8 – Williams	Fifth Third Arena (11,029); Cincinnati, OH
February 24, 2024; 3:00 p.m., ESPN2		Oklahoma; Bedlam Series	L 82–84 ^{OT}	12–15 (4–10)	21 – Tied	9 – Dailey Jr.	4 – Tied	Gallagher-Iba Arena (11,370); Stillwater, OK
February 28, 2024; 7:00 p.m., ESPN+		UCF	L 71–77	12–16 (4–11)	22 – Wright	6 – Garrison	3 – Keller	Gallagher-Iba Arena (5,044); Stillwater, OK
March 2, 2024; 1:00 p.m., ESPN2		at Texas	L 65–81	12–17 (4–12)	18 – Wright	7 – Williams	3 – Marsh	Moody Center (10,485); Austin, TX
March 5, 2024; 7:00 p.m., ESPN+		Texas Tech	L 58–75	12–18 (4–13)	12 – Dailey Jr.	7 – Garrison	3 – Tied	Gallagher-Iba Arena (6,023); Stillwater, OK
March 9, 2024; 8:00 p.m., ESPN+		at No. 20 BYU	L 71–85	12–19 (4–14)	34 – Small	6 – Keller	2 – Tied	Marriott Center (17,978); Provo, UT
Big 12 tournament
March 12, 2024; 11:30 a.m., ESPN+	(13)	vs. (12) UCF; First Round	L 62–77	12–20	21 – Small	9 – Dailey Jr.	5 – Williams	T-Mobile Center; Kansas City, MO
*Non-conference game. ^{#}Rankings from AP Poll. (#) Tournament seedings in parentheses. All times are in Central Time.
