= 2023–24 BYU Cougars men's basketball team =

American college basketball season

2023–24 BYU Cougars men's basketball
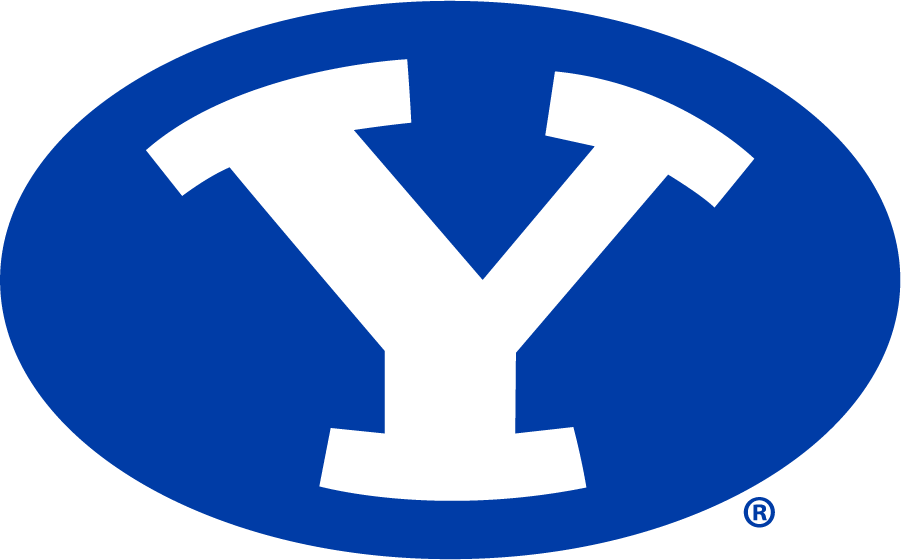

Vegas Showdown champions

NCAA tournament, First Round
- Conference: Big 12 Conference
- Record: 23–11 (10–8 Big 12)
- Head coach: Mark Pope (5th season)
- Associate head coach: Cody Fueger
- Assistant coaches: Nick Robinson; Kahil Fennell; Collin Terry
- Home arena: Marriott Center

2023–24 Big 12 men's basketball standings
	Conf.				Overall
Team	W		L	PCT	W		L	PCT
No. 3т Houston	15	–	3	.833	32	–	5	.865
No. 8 Iowa State †	13	–	5	.722	29	–	8	.784
No. 16 Baylor	11	–	7	.611	24	–	11	.686
Texas Tech	11	–	7	.611	23	–	11	.676
BYU	10	–	8	.556	23	–	11	.676
No. 19 Kansas	10	–	8	.556	23	–	11	.676
Texas	9	–	9	.500	21	–	13	.618
TCU	9	–	9	.500	21	–	13	.618
Oklahoma	8	–	10	.444	20	–	12	.625
Kansas State	8	–	10	.444	19	–	15	.559
Cincinnati	7	–	11	.389	22	–	15	.595
UCF	7	–	11	.389	17	–	16	.515
Oklahoma State	4	–	14	.222	12	–	20	.375
West Virginia	4	–	14	.222	9	–	23	.281
† 2024 Big 12 tournament winner Rankings from AP poll

The 2023–24 BYU Cougars men's basketball team represented Brigham Young University during the 2023–24 NCAA Division I men's basketball season. The Cougars were led by fifth-year head coach Mark Pope and played their home games at Marriott Center in Provo, Utah as first-year members of the Big 12 Conference. They finished the season 23–11, 10–8 in Big 12 play to finish in a tie for fifth place. As the No. 5 seed in the Big 12 tournament, they defeated UCF in the second round before losing to Texas Tech. They received an at-large bid to the NCAA tournament as the No. 6 seed in the East region. The Cougars lost in the first round to Duquesne.

On April 12, 2024, head coach Mark Pope left the school to take the head coaching position at Kentucky.

The season marked the first for BYU as members of the Big 12, having left the West Coast conference to join the Big 12 on July 1, 2023.

The BYU Cougars men's basketball team drew an average home attendance of 15,689 in 18 games in 2023–24.

== Previous season ==
The Cougars finished the 2022–23 season 19–15, 7–9 in WCC play to finish in a 3-way tie for fifth place. Due to a tiebreaker, as the No. 5 seed in the WCC tournament, they defeated Portland in the second round, Loyola Marymount in the quarterfinals before losing to Saint Mary's in the semifinals.

== Offseason ==
=== Departures ===
Name	Number	Pos.	Height	Weight	Year	Hometown	Reason for departure
Rudi Williams	3	G	6'2"	195	Senior	Hamilton, ON	Graduated
Gideon George	5	F	6'6"	210	Senior	Minna, Nigeria	Graduated
Tanner Toolson	13	G	6'5"	190	Freshman	Vancouver, WA	Transferred to Utah Valley
Nate Webb	33	F	6'6"	210	Sophomore	Rexburg, ID	Walk-on; TBD
Hao Dong	55	F	6'5"	210	Freshman	Beijing, China	Walk-on; transferred

=== Incoming transfers ===
Name	Number	Pos.	Height	Weight	Year	Hometown	Previous School
Dawson Baker	24	G	6'4"	190	Junior	Coto de Caza, CA	UC Irvine
Aly Khalifa	50	F/C	6'11"	230	RS Junior	Alexandria, Egypt	Charlotte

=== Recruiting classes ===
==== 2023 recruiting class ====
There were no incoming recruits for the class of 2023.

== Roster ==
2023–24 BYU Cougars men's basketball team
Players
Coaches

Pos.	#	Name	Height	Weight	Year	Previous school	Hometown
F	0	Noah Waterman	6 ft 11 in (2.11 m)	215 lb (98 kg)	Jr	Niagara	Savannah, NY
G	1	Trey Stewart	6 ft 2 in (1.88 m)	189 lb (86 kg)	Jr	American Fork	American Fork, UT
G	2	Jaxson Robinson	6 ft 7 in (2.01 m)	200 lb (91 kg)	Jr	Arkansas	Ada, OK
F	4	Atiki Ally Atiki	6 ft 10 in (2.08 m)	213 lb (97 kg)	Jr	London Basketball Academy (ON)	Mwanza, Tanzania
F	10	Tredyn Christensen (W)	6 ft 7 in (2.01 m)	235 lb (107 kg)	Sr	Chaminade	Eagle Mountain, UT
F	12	Townsend Tripple (W)	6 ft 8 in (2.03 m)	200 lb (91 kg)	RS Fr	Rocky Mountain	Meridian, ID
G	15	Richie Saunders	6 ft 5 in (1.96 m)	200 lb (91 kg)	So	Wasatch Academy	Riverton, UT
G	20	Spencer Johnson	6 ft 5 in (1.96 m)	185 lb (84 kg)	RS Sr	Salt Lake CC	American Fork, UT
G	21	Trevin Knell	6 ft 5 in (1.96 m)	197 lb (89 kg)	RS Jr	Woods Cross	Woods Cross, UT
F	23	Marcus Adams, Jr.	6 ft 8 in (2.03 m)	200 lb (91 kg)	Fr	Kansas	Harbor City, CA
G	24	Tanner Hayhurst (W)	6 ft 6 in (1.98 m)	204 lb (93 kg)	RS Fr	Eagle	Eagle, ID
G	25	Dawson Baker	6 ft 4 in (1.93 m)	190 lb (86 kg)	RS Jr	UC Irvine	Coto de Caza, CA
G	30	Dallin Hall	6 ft 4 in (1.93 m)	180 lb (82 kg)	So	Fremont	Plain City, UT
F	45	Fousseyni Traore	6 ft 6 in (1.98 m)	254 lb (115 kg)	Jr	Wasatch Academy	Bamako, Mali
F/C	50	Aly Khalifa	6 ft 11 in (2.11 m)	230 lb (104 kg)	RS Jr	Charlotte	Alexandria, Egypt
G	51	Jared McGregor (W)	6 ft 2 in (1.88 m)	185 lb (84 kg)	So	Westlake	Saratoga Springs, UT

Head coach

- Mark Pope (Kentucky)

Assistant coach(es)

- Cody Fueger (Utah)
- Nick Robinson (Stanford)
- Kahil Fennell (Redlands)

Legend

- (C) Team captain
- (S) Suspended
- (I) Ineligible
- (W) Walk-on
- Injured
- Current redshirt

Roster

== Schedule and results ==
Date time, TV	Rank^{#}	Opponent^{#}	Result	Record	High points	High rebounds	High assists	Site (attendance) city, state
Exhibition
November 4, 2023*; 7:00 p.m., BYUtv/ESPN+		Life Pacific	W 83–55	n/a	20 – Robinson	8 – Waterman	5 – Johnson	Marriott Center (13,733); Provo, UT
Non-conference Regular season
November 6, 2023*; 7:00 p.m., ESPN+		Houston Christian	W 110–63	1–0	20 – Johnson	9 – Traore	7 – Johnson	Marriott Center (13,103); Provo, UT
November 10, 2023*; 7:00 p.m., ESPN+		No. 17 San Diego State	W 74–65	2–0	18 – Hall	8 – Traore	4 – Traore	Marriott Center (15,689); Provo, UT
November 15, 2023*; 7:00 p.m., ESPN+		Southeastern Louisiana	W 105–48	3–0	18 – Tied	8 – Ally Atiki	6 – Tied	Marriott Center (13,116); Provo, UT
November 18, 2023; 7:00 p.m., ESPN+		Morgan State	W 93–50	4–0	19 – Robinson	6 – Robinson	8 – Johnson	Marriott Center (13,736); Provo, UT
November 23, 2023; 10:00 p.m., ESPN2		vs. Arizona State; Vegas Showdown semifinals	W 77–49	5–0	24 – Waterman	9 – Tied	5 – Traore	Michelob Ultra Arena (2,223); Paradise, NV
November 24, 2023*; 8:00 p.m., ESPN2		vs. NC State; Vegas Showdown championship	W 95–86	6–0	23 – Robinson	9 – Khalifa	5 – Khalifa	Michelob Ultra Arena (2,647); Paradise, NV
December 1, 2023*; 7:00 p.m., ESPN+	No. 19	vs. Fresno State	W 85–56	7–0	24 – Robinson	6 – Knell	5 – Tied	Delta Center (11,360); Salt Lake City, UT
December 5, 2023*; 7:00 p.m., ESPN+	No. 14	Evansville	W 96–55	8–0	19 – Robinson	8 – Waterman	7 – Hall	Marriott Center (13,291); Provo, UT
December 9, 2023; 5:00 p.m., P12N	No. 14	at Utah	L 69-73	8–1	17 – Robinson	11 – Johnson	6 – Khalifa	Jon M. Huntsman Center (15,648); Salt Lake City, UT
December 13, 2023*; 7:00 p.m., ESPN+	No. 18	Denver	W 90–74	9–1	28 – Robinson	14 – Waterman	6 – Johnson	Marriott Center (13,349); Provo, UT
December 16, 2023*; 7:00 p.m., ESPN+	No. 18	Georgia State	W 86–54	10–1	20 – Saunders	7 – Ally Atiki	7 – Johnson	Marriott Center (13,819); Provo, UT
December 22, 2023*; 7:00 p.m., ESPN+	No. 17	Bellarmine	W 101–59	11–1	14 – Tied	8 – Johnson	7 – Johnson	Marriott Center (14,429); Provo, UT
December 30, 2023*; 4:00 p.m., ESPN+	No. 14	Wyoming	W 94–68	12–1	17 – Tied	8 – Tied	8 – Khalifa	Marriott Center (17,978); Provo, UT
Big 12 regular season
January 6, 2024; 8:00 p.m., ESPN2	No. 12	Cincinnati	L 60–71	12–2 (0–1)	27 – Knell	8 – Waterman	6 – Khalifa	Marriott Center (16,879); Provo, UT
January 9, 2024; 7:00 p.m., ESPN+	No. 18	at No. 14 Baylor	L 72–81	12–3 (0–2)	15 – Tied	6 – Waterman	6 – Khalifa	Foster Pavilion (7,500); Waco, TX
January 13, 2024; 2:00 p.m., ESPN+	No. 18	at UCF	W 63–58	13–3 (1–2)	17 – Khalifa	7 – Waterman	6 – Hall	Addition Financial Arena (9,137); Orlando, FL
January 16, 2024; 7:00 p.m., ESPN+	No. 20	No. 24 Iowa State	W 87–72	14–3 (2–2)	28 – Johnson	9 – Johnson	8 – Hall	Marriott Center (15,491); Provo, UT
January 20, 2024; 4:00 p.m., ESPN2	No. 20	at No. 25 Texas Tech	L 78–85	14–4 (2–3)	21 – Khalifa	8 – Traore	6 – Hall	United Supermarkets Arena (15,098); Lubbock, TX
January 23, 2024; 7:00 p.m., ESPN+	No. 21	No. 4 Houston	L 68–75	14–5 (2–4)	17 – Waterman	6 – Tied	5 – Hall	Marriott Center (16,553); Provo, UT
January 27, 2024; 12:00 p.m., ESPN2	No. 21	Texas	W 84–72	15–5 (3–4)	17 – Tied	8 – Johnson	8 – Khalifa	Marriott Center (17,978); Provo, UT
February 3, 2024; 4:00 p.m., ESPN+	No. 22	at West Virginia	W 86–73	16–5 (4–4)	24 – Traore	9 – Traore	12 – Hall	WVU Coliseum (11,753); Morgantown, WV
February 6, 2024; 6:00 p.m., ESPN+	No. 21	at Oklahoma	L 66–82	16–6 (4–5)	21 – Traore	8 – Waterman	4 – Johnson	Lloyd Noble Center (6,834); Norman, OK
February 10, 2024; 8:00 p.m., ESPN2	No. 21	Kansas State	W 72–66	17–6 (5–5)	14 – Traore	8 – Traore	6 – Khalifa	Marriott Center (17,446); Provo, UT
February 13, 2024; 7:00 p.m., ESPN+	No. 19	UCF	W 90–88	18–6 (6–5)	21 – Robinson	9 – Waterman	5 – Hall	Marriott Center (15,590); Provo, UT
February 17, 2024; 12:00 p.m., ESPN+	No. 19	at Oklahoma State	L 83–93	18–7 (6–6)	17 – Traore	6 – Hall	4 – Hall	Gallagher-Iba Arena (7,360); Stillwater, OK
February 20, 2024; 7:00 p.m., ESPN	No. 25	No. 11 Baylor	W 78–71	19–7 (7–6)	14 – Khalifa	9 – Johnson	7 – Khalifa	Marriott Center (17,978); Provo, UT
February 24, 2024; 12:00 p.m., ESPN+	No. 25	at Kansas State	L 74–84	19–8 (7–7)	15 – Robinson	7 – Waterman	8 – Hall	Bramlage Coliseum (9,117); Manhattan, KS
February 27, 2024; 6:00 p.m., ESPN+		at No. 7 Kansas	W 76–68	20–8 (8–7)	18 – Tied	7 – Traore	5 – Traore	Allen Fieldhouse (16,300); Lawrence, KS
March 2, 2024; 7:00 p.m., ESPN+		TCU	W 87–75	21–8 (9–7)	21 – Traore	7 – Tied	7 – Hall	Marriott Center (17,978); Provo, UT
March 6, 2024; 7:00 p.m., ESPN2	No. 20	at No. 6 Iowa State	L 63–68	21–9 (9–8)	20 – Saunders	11 – Tied	6 – Khalifa	Hilton Coliseum (14,267); Ames, IA
March 9, 2024; 7:00 p.m., ESPN+	No. 20	Oklahoma State	W 85–71	22–9 (10–8)	19 – Traore	10 – Johnson	6 – Hall	Marriott Center (17,978); Provo, UT
Big 12 tournament
March 13, 2024; 10:30 a.m., ESPN2	(5) No. 20	vs. (12) UCF; Second Round	W 87–73	23–9	14 – Traore	10 – Traore	7 – Johnson	T-Mobile Center (16,044); Kansas City, MO
March 14, 2024; 10:30 a.m., ESPN2	(5) No. 20	vs. (4) No. 25 Texas Tech; Quarterfinals	L 67–81	23–10	18 – Robinson	7 – Johnson	7 – Hall	T-Mobile Center; Kansas City, MO
NCAA tournament
March 21, 2024*; 10:40 a.m., TruTV	(6 E) No. 21	vs. (11 E) Duquesne; First Round	L 67–71	23–11	25 – Robinson	16 – Johnson	6 – Hall	CHI Health Center; Omaha, NE
*Non-conference game. ^{#}Rankings from AP Poll. (#) Tournament seedings in parentheses. All times are in Mountain Time.

== Rankings ==
Ranking movements Legend: ██ Increase in ranking ██ Decrease in ranking — = Not ranked RV = Received votes т = Tied with team above or below
	Week																				
Poll	Pre	1	2	3	4	5	6	7	8	9	10	11	12	13	14	15	16	17	18	19	Final
AP	—	RV	RV	19	14	18	17	14	12	18	20	21	22	21	19	25	RV	20	20	21	RV
Coaches	—	RV	RV	19	13т	17	15	12	12	17	19	19	21	19	17	21	RV	23	21	21	RV
