= 2023–24 Iowa State Cyclones men's basketball team =

American college basketball season

2023–24 Iowa State Cyclones men's basketball

Big 12 tournament champions

NCAA tournament, Sweet Sixteen
- Conference: Big 12 Conference

Ranking
- Coaches: No. 7
- AP: No. 8
- Record: 29–8 (13–5 Big 12)
- Head coach: T. J. Otzelberger (3rd season)
- Assistant coaches: Kyle Green; J.R. Blount; Nate Schmidt
- Home arena: Hilton Coliseum

2023–24 Big 12 men's basketball standings
	Conf.				Overall
Team	W		L	PCT	W		L	PCT
No. 3т Houston	15	–	3	.833	32	–	5	.865
No. 8 Iowa State †	13	–	5	.722	29	–	8	.784
No. 16 Baylor	11	–	7	.611	24	–	11	.686
Texas Tech	11	–	7	.611	23	–	11	.676
BYU	10	–	8	.556	23	–	11	.676
No. 19 Kansas	10	–	8	.556	23	–	11	.676
Texas	9	–	9	.500	21	–	13	.618
TCU	9	–	9	.500	21	–	13	.618
Oklahoma	8	–	10	.444	20	–	12	.625
Kansas State	8	–	10	.444	19	–	15	.559
Cincinnati	7	–	11	.389	22	–	15	.595
UCF	7	–	11	.389	17	–	16	.515
Oklahoma State	4	–	14	.222	12	–	20	.375
West Virginia	4	–	14	.222	9	–	23	.281
† 2024 Big 12 tournament winner Rankings from AP poll

The 2023–24 Iowa State Cyclones men's basketball team represented Iowa State University during the 2023–24 NCAA Division I men's basketball season. The Cyclones were coached by T. J. Otzelberger in his third season as head coach. They played their home games at Hilton Coliseum in Ames, Iowa as members of the Big 12 Conference. The Iowa State Cyclones men's basketball team drew an average home attendance of 13,868 in 2023–24, the 18th highest in college basketball.

== Previous season ==
The Cyclones started the season 9–2 in non-conference play, including a runner-up finish in the Phil Knight Invitational (PK85) with wins over Villanova and top-ranked North Carolina before falling to eventual national champion UConn. They finished the 2022–23 season 19–14, 9–9 in Big 12 play to finish a tie for fifth place. As the No. 5 seed in the Big 12 tournament, they defeated the No. 4 seed Baylor before falling to top seeded Kansas. They received an at-large bid to the NCAA tournament as the No. 6 seed in the Midwest region. In the first round, the Cyclones fell to No. 11 seed Pittsburgh, 59–41.

The season represented one of the best in school history versus ranked opponents, including wins over the number 1, 5, 7 (twice), 8, 10, 12, 17 and 22nd ranked teams. The Cyclones went 6–3 against top ten teams.

== Offseason ==
=== Departures ===
Offseason departures
Name	Position	Reason for departure
Eli King	Guard	Transferred to North Dakota
Caleb Grill	Guard	Dismissed during 2022–23 season. Later transferred to Missouri.
Aljaž Kunč	Forward	Exhausted eligibility
Jaren Holmes	Guard	Exhausted eligibility
Osun Osunniyi	Forward	Exhausted eligibility
Gabe Kalscheur	Guard	Exhausted eligibility
Jeremiah Williams	Guard	Transferred to Rutgers

=== Incoming transfers ===
Incoming transfers
Name	Position	Hometown	Previous school	Incoming eligibility	Source
Jackson Paveletzke	Guard	Kimberly, Wisconsin	Wofford	So.	
Curtis Jones	Guard	Minneapolis	Buffalo	Sr.	
Keshon Gilbert	Guard	St. Louis, Missouri	UNLV	Jr.	

=== 2023 recruiting class ===
College recruiting
Name	Hometown	School	Height	Weight	Commit date
Kayden Fish; F	Kansas City, Missouri	Staley	6 ft 6 in (1.98 m)	250 lb (110 kg)	Aug 8, 2022
Kayden Fish; F	Recruit ratings: Rivals: 247Sports: ESPN: (81)				
Omaha Biliew; F	Waukee, Iowa	Waukee	6 ft 8 in (2.03 m)	215 lb (98 kg)	Jul 26, 2022
Omaha Biliew; F	Recruit ratings: Rivals: 247Sports: ESPN: (92)				
Milan Momcilovic; F	Pewaukee, Wisconsin	Pewaukee	6 ft 8 in (2.03 m)	210 lb (95 kg)	Jul 16, 2022
Milan Momcilovic; F	Recruit ratings: Rivals: 247Sports: ESPN: (86)				
Jelani Hamilton; G	Marietta, GA	Wheeler	6 ft 5 in (1.96 m)	180 lb (82 kg)	Jul 1, 2022
Jelani Hamilton; G	Recruit ratings: Rivals: 247Sports: ESPN: (82)				
JT Rock; C	Sioux Falls, South Dakota	Lincoln	7 ft 1 in (2.16 m)	245 lb (111 kg)	Jan 4, 2023
JT Rock; C	Recruit ratings: Rivals: 247Sports: ESPN: (83)				
Cade Kelderman (W); G	Waukee, Iowa	Waukee Northwest	6 ft 1 in (1.85 m)	170 lb (77 kg)	Apr 19, 2023
Cade Kelderman (W); G	Recruit ratings: Rivals: 247Sports: ESPN: (N/A)				
Overall recruit ranking: Rivals: 7 247Sports: 10 ESPN: 11
Note: In many cases, Scout, Rivals, 247Sports, On3, and ESPN may conflict in their listings of height and weight.; In these cases, the average was taken. ESPN grades are on a 100-point scale.; Sources: "Iowa State 2023 Basketball Commitments". Rivals.; "2023 Iowa State Cyclones Recruiting Class". ESPN.; "2023 Team Ranking". Rivals.

== Roster ==
2023–24 Iowa State Cyclones men's basketball team
Players
Coaches

Pos.	#	Name	Height	Weight	Year	Previous school	Hometown
F	0	Tre King	6 ft 7 in (2.01 m)	230 lb (104 kg)	RS Sr	Georgetown	Lexington, Kentucky
G	1	Jackson Paveletzke	6 ft 2 in (1.88 m)	175 lb (79 kg)	So	Wofford	Kimberly, Wisconsin
G	2	Jelani Hamilton (redshirt)	6 ft 5 in (1.96 m)	180 lb (82 kg)	Fr	Wheeler	Marietta, GA
G	3	Tamin Lipsey	6 ft 1 in (1.85 m)	200 lb (91 kg)	So	Ames High School	Ames, Iowa
G	4	Demarion Watson	6 ft 7 in (2.01 m)	215 lb (98 kg)	So	Totino-Grace	Minneapolis
G	5	Curtis Jones	6 ft 4 in (1.93 m)	175 lb (79 kg)	Sr	Buffalo	Minneapolis
G	10	Keshon Gilbert	6 ft 4 in (1.93 m)	190 lb (86 kg)	Jr	UNLV	St. Louis, Missouri
F	11	Kayden Fish	6 ft 6 in (1.98 m)	250 lb (113 kg)	Fr	Staley	Kansas City, Missouri
F	12	Robert Jones	6 ft 10 in (2.08 m)	250 lb (113 kg)	Sr	Denver	Prior Lake, Minnesota
G	13	Cade Kelderman (W)	6 ft 1 in (1.85 m)	170 lb (77 kg)	Fr	Waukee Northwest	Waukee, Iowa
F	22	Milan Momcilovic	6 ft 8 in (2.03 m)	210 lb (95 kg)	Fr	Pewaukee	Pewaukee, Wisconsin
F	23	Conrad Hawley (W)	6 ft 5 in (1.96 m)	220 lb (100 kg)	Jr	Kansas*	Raymore, Missouri
F	24	Hason Ward	6 ft 9 in (2.06 m)	225 lb (102 kg)	Sr	VCU	Springfield, Massachusetts
C	30	JT Rock (redshirt)	7 ft 1 in (2.16 m)	245 lb (111 kg)	Fr	Lincoln	Sioux Falls, South Dakota
F	33	Omaha Biliew	6 ft 8 in (2.03 m)	215 lb (98 kg)	Fr	Waukee	Waukee, Iowa

Head coach

- T. J. Otzelberger (UW–Whitewater)

Assistant coach(es)

- Kyle Green (Hamline)
- J.R. Blount (Loyola Chicago)
- Nate Schmidt (Denison)

Legend

- (C) Team captain
- (S) Suspended
- (I) Ineligible
- (W) Walk-on
- Injured
- Current redshirt

Roster
Last update: July 22, 2023

*Hawley played football at Kansas and was not a member of the basketball team.

== Schedule and results ==
Date time, TV	Rank^{#}	Opponent^{#}	Result	Record	High points	High rebounds	High assists	Site (attendance) city, state
Regular season
Nov 6, 2023*; 7:00 p.m., ESPN+		Green Bay	W 85–44	1–0	18 – Momcilovic	8 – Tied	7 – Lipsey	Hilton Coliseum (13,360); Ames, Iowa
Nov 9, 2023*; 7:00 p.m., ESPN+		Lindenwood	W 102–47	2–0	21 – Lipsey	7 – King	7 – Lipsey	Hilton Coliseum (13,327); Ames, Iowa
Nov 12, 2023*; 12:00 p.m., ESPN+		Idaho State	W 86–55	3–0	16 – Tied	6 – Gilbert	5 – Lipsey	Hilton Coliseum (13,529); Ames, Iowa
Nov 19, 2023*; 12:00 p.m., ESPN+		Grambling State	W 92–37	4–0	17 – Lipsey	8 – King	9 – Lipsey	Hilton Coliseum (12,975); Ames, Iowa
Nov 23, 2023*; 4:30 p.m., ESPN2		vs. VCU; ESPN Events Invitational quarterfinals	W 68–64	5–0	22 – Tied	10 – Gilbert	4 – Tied	State Farm Field House (2,458); Kissimmee, Florida
Nov 24, 2023*; 4:30 p.m., ESPN2		vs. Virginia Tech; ESPN Events Invitational semifinals	L 62–71	5–1	21 – Momcilovic	7 – Tied	4 – Tied	State Farm Field House (2,579); Kissimmee, Florida
Nov 26, 2023*; 6:30 p.m., ESPN2		vs. No. 12 Texas A&M; ESPN Events Invitational 3rd place game	L 69–73	5–2	14 – Momcilovic	14 – Lipsey	7 – Gilbert	State Farm Field House (1,964); Kissimmee, Florida
Dec 1, 2023*; 7:30 p.m., FS1		at DePaul; Big East–Big 12 Battle	W 99–80	6–2	24 – King	10 – Lipsey	10 – Lipsey	Wintrust Arena (4,852); Chicago
Dec 7, 2023*; 6:30 p.m., ESPNU		Iowa; Iowa Corn Cy-Hawk Series	W 90–65	7–2	25 – Gilbert	7 – Lipsey	6 – Tied	Hilton Coliseum (14,267); Ames, Iowa
Dec 10, 2023*; 12:00 p.m., ESPN+		Prairie View A&M	W 107–56	8–2	22 – C. Jones	8 – Tied	8 – Gilbert	Hilton Coliseum (13,570); Ames, Iowa
Dec 17, 2023*; 5:00 p.m., ESPN+		Florida A&M	W 96–58	9–2	19 – Lipsey	10 – King	5 – Tied	Hilton Coliseum (13,081); Ames, Iowa
Dec 21, 2023*; 7:00 p.m., ESPN+		Eastern Illinois	W 80–48	10–2	18 – C. Jones	6 – Tied	7 – Lipsey	Hilton Coliseum (12,841); Ames, Iowa
Dec 31, 2023*; 12:00 p.m., ESPN+		New Hampshire	W 85–70	11–2	16 – Lipsey	10 – Gilbert	11 – Gilbert	Hilton Coliseum (14,267); Ames, Iowa
Big 12
Jan 6, 2024; 5:00 p.m., ESPN+		at No. 11 Oklahoma	L 63–71	11–3 (0–1)	12 – Tied	7 – Tied	5 – Lipsey	Lloyd Noble Center (11,333); Norman, Oklahoma
Jan 9, 2024; 6:00 p.m., ESPN2		No. 2 Houston	W 57–53	12–3 (1–1)	14 – Lipsey	9 – King	4 – Gilbert	Hilton Coliseum (14,267); Ames, Iowa
Jan 13, 2024; 7:15 p.m., ESPN+		Oklahoma State	W 66–42	13–3 (2–1)	17 – Lipsey	7 – King	5 – Tied	Hilton Coliseum (14,267); Ames, Iowa
Jan 16, 2024; 8:00 p.m., ESPN+	No. 24	at No. 20 BYU	L 72–87	13–4 (2–2)	16 – Gilbert	6 – Ward	5 – Lipsey	Marriott Center (15,491); Provo, Utah
Jan 20, 2024; 1:00 p.m., ESPNU	No. 24	at No. 19 TCU	W 72–71	14–4 (3–2)	20 – Gilbert	6 – Watson	4 – Tied	Schollmaier Arena (7,739); Fort Worth, Texas
Jan 24, 2024; 8:00 p.m., ESPN2	No. 23	Kansas State	W 78–67	15–4 (4–2)	19 – Momcilovic	13 – Gilbert	6 – Lipsey	Hilton Coliseum (14,267); Ames, Iowa
Jan 27, 2024; 12:30 p.m., CBS	No. 23	No. 7 Kansas	W 79–75	16–4 (5–2)	21 – King	9 – King	8 – Lipsey	Hilton Coliseum (14,267); Ames, Iowa
Feb 3, 2024; 7:00 p.m., ESPN2	No. 12	at No. 18 Baylor	L 68–70	16–5 (5–3)	24 – Gilbert	7 – R. Jones	3 – Tied	Foster Pavilion (7,500); Waco, Texas
Feb 6, 2024; 7:00 p.m., LHN	No. 14	at Texas	W 70–65	17–5 (6–3)	13 – Momcilovic	7 – Tied	5 – Lipsey	Moody Center (10,663); Austin, Texas
Feb 10, 2024; 1:00 p.m., ESPN2	No. 14	TCU	W 71–59	18–5 (7–3)	15 – King	5 – Momcilovic	7 – Gilbert	Hilton Coliseum (14,267); Ames, Iowa
Feb 13, 2024; 6:00 p.m., ESPN2	No. 10	at Cincinnati	W 68–59	19–5 (8–3)	15 – Tied	6 – R. Jones	4 – Lipsey	Fifth Third Arena (11,819); Cincinnati
Feb 17, 2024; 11:00 a.m., ESPN+	No. 10	Texas Tech	W 82–74	20–5 (9–3)	24 – Gilbert	8 – Gilbert	5 – Gilbert	Hilton Coliseum (14,267); Ames, Iowa
Feb 19, 2024; 8:00 p.m., ESPN	No. 6	at No. 2 Houston	L 65–73	20–6 (9–4)	17 – Gilbert	8 – King	5 – Gilbert	Fertitta Center (7,895); Houston
Feb 24, 2024; 1:00 p.m., ESPN2	No. 6	West Virginia	W 71–64	21–6 (10–4)	14 – Lipsey	5 – Tied	6 – Lipsey	Hilton Coliseum (14,267); Ames, Iowa
Feb 28, 2024; 7:00 p.m., ESPN+	No. 8	Oklahoma	W 58–45	22–6 (11–4)	15 – Watson	9 – Watson	7 – Gilbert	Hilton Coliseum (14,267); Ames, Iowa
Mar 2, 2024; 3:00 p.m., ESPN+	No. 8	at UCF	W 60–52	23–6 (12–4)	16 – King	6 – Tied	4 – Tied	Addition Financial Arena (9,392); Orlando, Florida
Mar 6, 2024; 8:00 p.m., ESPN2	No. 6	No. 20 BYU	W 68–63	24–6 (13–4)	19 – Lipsey	6 – Tied	5 – Gilbert	Hilton Coliseum (14,267); Ames, Iowa
Mar 9, 2024; 1:00 p.m., ESPN2	No. 6	at Kansas State	L 58–65	24–7 (13–5)	16 – C. Jones	6 – King	3 – Gilbert	Bramlage Coliseum (9,311); Manhattan, Kansas
Big 12 Tournament
Mar 14, 2024; 6:00 p.m., ESPN2	(2) No. 7	vs. (10) Kansas State; Quarterfinals	W 76–57	25–7	18 – R. Jones	9 – King	5 – Gilbert	T-Mobile Center (19,135); Kansas City, Missouri
Mar 15, 2024; 8:30 p.m., ESPN	(2) No. 7	vs. (3) No. 14 Baylor; Semifinals	W 76–62	26–7	20 – Gilbert	7 – Gilbert	7 – Gilbert	T-Mobile Center (19,135); Kansas City, Missouri
Mar 16, 2024; 5:00 p.m., ESPN	(2) No. 7	vs. (1) No. 1 Houston; Championship	W 69–41	27–7	18 – Momcilovic	9 – King	6 – Lipsey	T-Mobile Center (19,135); Kansas City, Missouri
NCAA Tournament
March 21, 2024; 6:35 p.m., TruTV	(2 E) No. 4	vs. (15 E) South Dakota State; First Round	W 82–65	28–7	19 – Momcilovic	7 – King	7 – Lipsey	CHI Health Center (17,391); Omaha, Nebraska
March 23, 2024; 5:10 p.m., TNT	(2 E) No. 4	vs. (7 E) No. 25 Washington State; Second Round	W 67–56	29–7	15 – Lipsey	6 – Ward	4 – Tied	CHI Health Center (17,387); Omaha, Nebraska
March 28, 2024; 9:14 p.m., TBS	(2 E) No. 4	vs. (3 E) No. 10 Illinois; Sweet Sixteen	L 69–72	29–8	26 – C. Jones	7 – King	4 – Lipsey	TD Garden (19,144); Boston
*Non-conference game. ^{#}Rankings from AP poll. (#) Tournament seedings in parentheses. All times are in Central Time.

== Rankings ==
Ranking movements Legend: ██ Increase in ranking ██ Decrease in ranking — = Not ranked RV = Received votes
	Week																				
Poll	Pre	1	2	3	4	5	6	7	8	9	10	11	12	13	14	15	16	17	18	19	Final
AP	—	RV	RV	RV	—	RV	RV	RV	RV	RV	24	23	12	14	10	6	8	6	7	4	8
Coaches	RV	RV	RV	RV	RV	RV	RV	RV	RV	RV	20	18	11	14	10	6	6	6	8	4	7
