= 2023–24 Baylor Bears men's basketball team =

American college basketball season

2023–24 Baylor Bears men's basketball

NIT Season Tip-Off champions

NCAA tournament, Second Round
- Conference: Big 12 Conference

Ranking
- Coaches: No. 14
- AP: No. 16
- Record: 24–11 (11–7 Big 12)
- Head coach: Scott Drew (21st season)
- Associate head coach: Alvin Brooks III (8th season); John Jakus (7th season)
- Assistant coach: Jared Nuness (2nd season)
- Offensive scheme: Motion
- Base defense: No-Middle
- Home arena: Ferrell Center; Foster Pavilion

2023–24 Big 12 men's basketball standings
	Conf.				Overall
Team	W		L	PCT	W		L	PCT
No. 3т Houston	15	–	3	.833	32	–	5	.865
No. 8 Iowa State †	13	–	5	.722	29	–	8	.784
No. 16 Baylor	11	–	7	.611	24	–	11	.686
Texas Tech	11	–	7	.611	23	–	11	.676
BYU	10	–	8	.556	23	–	11	.676
No. 19 Kansas	10	–	8	.556	23	–	11	.676
Texas	9	–	9	.500	21	–	13	.618
TCU	9	–	9	.500	21	–	13	.618
Oklahoma	8	–	10	.444	20	–	12	.625
Kansas State	8	–	10	.444	19	–	15	.559
Cincinnati	7	–	11	.389	22	–	15	.595
UCF	7	–	11	.389	17	–	16	.515
Oklahoma State	4	–	14	.222	12	–	20	.375
West Virginia	4	–	14	.222	9	–	23	.281
† 2024 Big 12 tournament winner Rankings from AP poll

The 2023–24 Baylor Bears men's basketball team represented Baylor University in the 2023–24 NCAA Division I men's basketball season, which was the Bears' 118th season. The Bears, members of the Big 12 Conference, played their first seven home games at the Ferrell Center in Waco, Texas, before moving to their new arena at Foster Pavilion, which opened on January 2, 2024. They were led by 21st-year head coach Scott Drew.

== Previous season ==
The Bears finished the 2022–23 season 23–11, 11–7 in Big 12 play to finish in a tie for third place. They lost in the quarterfinals of the Big 12 tournament to Iowa State. They received an at-large bid to the NCAA tournament as the No. 3 seed in the South Region, where they defeated UC Santa Barbara in the first round before losing in the second round to Creighton.

== Offseason ==
=== Departures ===
Baylor Departures
Name	Number	Pos.	Height	Weight	Year	Hometown	Reason for Departure
Flo Thamba	0	F	6'10"	245	(redshirt) Senior	Kinshasa, DR Congo	Graduated
Keyonte George	1	G	6'4"	185	Freshman	Lewisville, TX	Declare for 2023 NBA draft; selected 16th overall by Utah Jazz
Jake Younkin	2	G	6'3"	195	Junior	Loveland, OH	Walk-on; didn't return
Dale Bonner	3	G	6'2"	170	Senior	Shaker Hights, OH	Graduate transferred to Ohio State
LJ Cryer	4	G	6'1"	185	Junior	Katy, TX	Transferred to Houston
Jordan Turner	5	G/F	6'8"	195	(redshirt) Senior	Houston, TX	Graduate transferred to Louisiana Tech
Adam Flagler	10	G	6'3"	180	(redshirt) Senior	Duluth, GA	Graduated/undrafted in 2023 NBA draft; signed with the Oklahoma City Thunder
Zach Loveday	32	F	7'0"	215	Junior	Gallipois, OH	Transferred to Samford

=== Incoming transfers ===
Incoming transfers
Name	Number	Pos.	Height	Weight	Year	Hometown	Previous School
Jayden Nunn	2	F	6'4"	190	Junior	Flint, Michigan	VCU
RayJ Dennis	10	G	6'2"	180	Senior	Plainfield, IL	Toledo

=== Recruiting classes ===
==== 2023 recruiting class ====
College recruiting information
Name	Hometown	School	Height	Weight	Commit date
Ja'Kobe Walter #2 SG	McKinney, TX	Link Academy	6 ft 5 in (1.96 m)	185 lb (84 kg)	Jun 22, 2022
Ja'Kobe Walter #2 SG	Recruit ratings: Scout: Rivals: 247Sports: ESPN: (93)				
Miro Little #5 PG	Bel Aire, KS	Sunrise Christian Academy	6 ft 4 in (1.93 m)	185 lb (84 kg)	Apr 15, 2022
Miro Little #5 PG	Recruit ratings: Scout: Rivals: 247Sports: ESPN: (87)				
Yves Missi #13 C	Colora, MD	Prolific Prep	6 ft 10 in (2.08 m)	215 lb (98 kg)	Apr 15, 2022
Yves Missi #13 C	Recruit ratings: Scout: Rivals: 247Sports: ESPN: (86)				
Overall recruit ranking: Rivals: 14 247Sports: 10
Note: In many cases, Scout, Rivals, 247Sports, On3, and ESPN may conflict in their listings of height and weight.; In these cases, the average was taken. ESPN grades are on a 100-point scale.; Sources: "Baylor 2023 Basketball Commitments". Rivals.; "2023 Baylor Bears Recruiting Class". ESPN.; "2023 Team Ranking". Rivals.

== Roster ==
2023–24 Baylor Bears men's basketball team
Players
Coaches

Pos.	#	Name	Height	Weight	Year	Previous school	Hometown
G	1	Miro Little	6 ft 4 in (1.93 m)	185 lb (84 kg)	Fr	Sunrise Christian	Tampere, Finland
G	2	Jayden Nunn	6 ft 4 in (1.93 m)	190 lb (86 kg)	Jr	VCU	Flint, MI
F	4	Ja'Kobe Walter	6 ft 5 in (1.96 m)	180 lb (82 kg)	Fr	Link Academy	McKinney, TX
G	10	RayJ Dennis	6 ft 2 in (1.88 m)	180 lb (82 kg)	Sr	Toledo	Plainfield, IL
F	11	Jalen Bridges	6 ft 7 in (2.01 m)	225 lb (102 kg)	RS Sr	West Virginia	Fairmont, WV
G	12	Dantwan Grimes	6 ft 2 in (1.88 m)	190 lb (86 kg)	RS Jr	Kilgore College	Ocala, FL
G	13	Langston Love	6 ft 5 in (1.96 m)	210 lb (95 kg)	RS So	Montverde Academy (FL)	Universal City, TX
F	15	Josh Ojianwuna	6 ft 10 in (2.08 m)	230 lb (104 kg)	So	NBA Global Academy	Asaba, Nigeria
F	20	Austin Sacks (W)	6 ft 7 in (2.01 m)	200 lb (91 kg)	Sr	Santa Clara	Encino, CA
F	21	Yves Missi	6 ft 10 in (2.08 m)	210 lb (95 kg)	Fr	Prolific Prep	Yaoundé, Cameroon
F	23	Jonathan Tchamwa Tchatchoua	6 ft 8 in (2.03 m)	250 lb (113 kg)	GS	UNLV	Douala, Cameroon
G	25	Omar Adegbola (W)	6 ft 4 in (1.93 m)	205 lb (93 kg)	Fr	Montverde Academy	Houston, TX
F	33	Caleb Lohner	6 ft 8 in (2.03 m)	235 lb (107 kg)	Sr	BYU	Dallas, TX

Head coach

- Scott Drew (Butler)

Assistant coach(es)

- Alvin Brooks III (Idaho State)
- John Jakus (Trinity International)
- Jared Nuness (Valparaiso)

Legend

- (C) Team captain
- (S) Suspended
- (I) Ineligible
- (W) Walk-on
- Injured
- Current redshirt

Roster

== Schedule and results ==
Date time, TV	Rank^{#}	Opponent^{#}	Result	Record	High points	High rebounds	High assists	Site (attendance) city, state
Non-conference regular season
November 7, 2023*; 8:00 p.m., ESPN	No. 20	vs. Auburn	W 88–82	1–0	28 – Walter	8 – Bridges	3 – Nunn	Sanford Pentagon (3,028); Sioux Falls, SD
November 9, 2023*; 11:00 a.m., ESPN+	No. 20	John Brown	W 96–70	2–0	20 – Love	10 – Ojianwuna	8 – Dennis	Ferrell Center (9,414); Waco, TX
November 12, 2023*; 4:00 p.m., ESPN+	No. 20	Gardner–Webb	W 77–62	3–0	14 – Walter	8 – Tied	4 – Dennis	Ferrell Center (8,037); Waco, TX
November 14, 2023*; 9:00 p.m., ESPN+	No. 15	Kansas City	W 99–61	4–0	25 – Nunn	6 – Lohner	8 – Dennis	Ferrell Center (7,903); Waco, TX
November 22, 2023*; 6:00 p.m., ESPN2	No. 13	vs. Oregon State; NIT Season Tip-Off semifinals	W 88–72	5–0	24 – Walter	14 – Missi	6 – Dennis	Barclays Center (–); Brooklyn, NY
November 24, 2023*; 4:30 p.m., ESPN	No. 13	vs. Florida; NIT Season Tip-Off championship	W 95–91	6–0	24 – Dennis	5 – Tied	8 – Dennis	Barclays Center (1,620); Brooklyn, NY
November 28, 2023*; 7:00 p.m., ESPN+	No. 9	Nicholls	W 108–70	7–0	23 – Love	7 – Tied	10 – Dennis	Ferrell Center (7,166); Waco, TX
December 2, 2023*; 5:00 p.m., ESPN+	No. 9	Northwestern State	W 91–40	8–0	16 – Bridges	10 – Missi	6 – Dennis	Ferrell Center (8,432); Waco, TX
December 5, 2023*; 8:00 p.m., ESPN2	No. 6	Seton Hall; Big East–Big 12 Battle	W 78–60	9–0	17 – Dennis	8 – Missi	7 – Dennis	Ferrell Center (8,269); Waco, TX
December 16, 2023*; 1:00 p.m., FOX	No. 6	vs. Michigan State; Motor City Invitational	L 64–88	9–1	11 – Tied	3 – Tied	7 – Dennis	Little Caesars Arena (13,277); Detroit, MI
December 20, 2023*; 6:00 p.m., ESPN	No. 10	vs. No. 21 Duke; SentinelOne Classic	L 70–78	9–2	17 – Dennis	10 – Missi	4 – Dennis	Madison Square Garden (18,512); New York, NY
December 22, 2023*; 6:00 p.m., ESPN+	No. 10	Mississippi Valley State; Final Game at Ferrell Center	W 107–48	10–2	26 – Walter	7 – Lohner	7 – Dennis	Ferrell Center (8,794); Waco, TX
January 2, 2024*; 7:00 p.m., ESPN+	No. 18	Cornell; First Game at Foster Pavilion	W 98–79	11–2	23 – Walter	9 – Walter	6 – Dennis	Foster Pavilion (7,500); Waco, TX
Big 12 Regular Season
January 6, 2024; 2:00 p.m., ESPN	No. 18	at Oklahoma State	W 75–70 ^{OT}	12–2 (1–0)	18 – Dennis	10 – Missi	4 – Dennis	Gallagher-Iba Arena (6,513); Stillwater, OK
January 9, 2024; 8:00 p.m., ESPN+	No. 14	No. 18 BYU	W 81–72	13–2 (2–0)	25 – Bridges	5 – Bridges	4 – Dennis	Foster Pavilion (7,500); Waco, TX
January 13, 2024; 7:00 p.m., ESPN2	No. 14	Cincinnati	W 62–59	14–2 (3–0)	14 – Tied	8 – Bridges	9 – Dennis	Foster Pavilion (7,500); Waco, TX
January 16, 2024; 7:00 p.m., ESPN+	No. 9	at Kansas State	L 64–68 ^{OT}	14–3 (3–1)	15 – Love	11 – Missi	8 – Dennis	Bramlage Coliseum (10,055); Manhattan, KS
January 20, 2024; 11:00 a.m., ESPN	No. 9	at Texas	L 73–75	14–4 (3–2)	22 – Walter	7 – Walter	8 – Dennis	Moody Center (11,163); Austin, TX
January 27, 2024; 3:00 p.m., ESPN2	No. 15	TCU	L 102–105 ^{3OT}	14–5 (3–3)	25 – Missi	10 – Love	10 – Dennis	Foster Pavilion (7,500); Waco, TX
January 31, 2024; 6:00 p.m., ESPN+	No. 18	at UCF	W 77–69	15–5 (4–3)	24 – Love	7 – Love	8 – Dennis	Addition Financial Arena (8,683); Orlando, FL
February 3, 2024; 7:00 p.m., ESPN2	No. 18	No. 12 Iowa State	W 70–68	16–5 (5–3)	18 – Dennis	7 – Dennis	4 – Love	Foster Pavilion (7,500); Waco, TX
February 6, 2024; 8:00 p.m., ESPN	No. 13	No. 23 Texas Tech	W 79–73	17–5 (6–3)	21 – Dennis	7 – Missi	5 – Dennis	Foster Pavilion (7,500); Waco, TX
February 10, 2024; 5:00 p.m., ESPN	No. 13	at No. 4 Kansas	L 61–64	17–6 (6–4)	21 – Missi	8 – Tied	8 – Dennis	Allen Fieldhouse (16,300); Lawrence, KS
February 13, 2024; 8:00 p.m., ESPN2	No. 12	No. 25 Oklahoma	W 79–62	18–6 (7–4)	27 – Nunn	6 – Walter	8 – Dennis	Foster Pavilion (7,500); Waco, TX
February 17, 2024; 5:00 p.m., ESPN2	No. 12	at West Virginia	W 94–81	19–6 (8–4)	23 – Walter	7 – Tied	8 – Dennis	WVU Coliseum (12,558); Morgantown, WV
February 20, 2024; 8:00 p.m., ESPN	No. 11	at No. 25 BYU	L 71–78	19–7 (8–5)	15 – Bridges	8 – Bridges	8 – Dennis	Marriott Center (17,978); Provo, UT
February 24, 2024; 11:00 a.m., CBS	No. 11	No. 2 Houston	L 76–82 ^{OT}	19–8 (8–6)	23 – Walter	13 – Bridges	5 – Tied	Foster Pavilion (7,500); Waco, TX
February 26, 2024; 8:00 p.m., ESPN	No. 15	at TCU	W 62–54	20–8 (9–6)	16 – Tied	9 – Dennis	9 – Dennis	Schollmaier Arena (6,810); Fort Worth, TX
March 2, 2024; 12:00 p.m., ABC	No. 15	No. 7 Kansas	W 82–74	21–8 (10–6)	19 – Dennis	8 – Walter	10 – Dennis	Foster Pavilion (7,500); Waco, TX
March 4, 2024; 8:00 p.m., ESPN	No. 11	Texas	W 93–85	22–8 (11–6)	32 – Bridges	9 – Bridges	8 – Dennis	Foster Pavilion (7,500); Waco, TX
March 9, 2024; 5:00 p.m., ESPN2	No. 11	at Texas Tech	L 68–78	22–9 (11–7)	15 – Walter	6 – Bridges	5 – Dennis	United Supermarkets Arena (14,432); Lubbock, TX
Big 12 tournament
March 14, 2024; 8:30 p.m., ESPN2	(3) No. 14	vs. (11) Cincinnati; Quarterfinals	W 68–56	23–9	13 – Dennis	9 – Bridges	6 – Dennis	T-Mobile Center (19,135); Kansas City, MO
March 15, 2024; 8:30 p.m., ESPN	(3) No. 14	vs. (2) No. 7 Iowa State; Semifinals	L 62–76	23–10	20 – Bridges	12 – Bridges	11 – Dennis	T-Mobile Center (19,135); Kansas City, MO
NCAA tournament
March 22, 2024; 11:40 a.m., TruTV	(3 W) No. 14	vs. (14 W) Colgate; First Round	W 92–67	24–10	23 – Bridges	7 – Ojianwuna	9 – Dennis	FedExForum; Memphis, TN
March 24, 2024; 5:10 p.m., TNT	(3 W) No. 14	vs. (6 W) Clemson; Second Round	L 64–72	24–11	27 – Dennis	6 – Tied	2 – Tied	FedExForum; Memphis, TN
*Non-conference game. ^{#}Rankings from AP Poll. (#) Tournament seedings in parentheses. All times are in Central Time.

== Rankings ==
Ranking movements Legend: ██ Increase in ranking ██ Decrease in ranking
	Week																				
Poll	Pre	1	2	3	4	5	6	7	8	9	10	11	12	13	14	15	16	17	18	19	Final
AP	20	15	13	9	6	6	10	17	18	14	9	15	18	13	12	11	15	11	14	14	16
Coaches	17	13	12	9	6	6	10	19	18	14	9	14	18	13	13	11	14	11	13	13	14
