= 2023–24 Texas Longhorns men's basketball team =

American college basketball season

2023–24 Texas Longhorns men's basketball

NCAA tournament, Second Round
- Conference: Big 12 Conference
- Record: 21–13 (9–9 Big 12)
- Head coach: Rodney Terry (1st season)
- Assistant coaches: Frank Haith (1st season); Steve McClain (2nd season); Brandon Chappell (2nd season); Byron Jones (1st season)
- Home arena: Moody Center

2023–24 Big 12 men's basketball standings
	Conf.				Overall
Team	W		L	PCT	W		L	PCT
No. 3т Houston	15	–	3	.833	32	–	5	.865
No. 8 Iowa State †	13	–	5	.722	29	–	8	.784
No. 16 Baylor	11	–	7	.611	24	–	11	.686
Texas Tech	11	–	7	.611	23	–	11	.676
BYU	10	–	8	.556	23	–	11	.676
No. 19 Kansas	10	–	8	.556	23	–	11	.676
Texas	9	–	9	.500	21	–	13	.618
TCU	9	–	9	.500	21	–	13	.618
Oklahoma	8	–	10	.444	20	–	12	.625
Kansas State	8	–	10	.444	19	–	15	.559
Cincinnati	7	–	11	.389	22	–	15	.595
UCF	7	–	11	.389	17	–	16	.515
Oklahoma State	4	–	14	.222	12	–	20	.375
West Virginia	4	–	14	.222	9	–	23	.281
† 2024 Big 12 tournament winner Rankings from AP poll

The 2023–24 Texas Longhorns men's basketball team represented the University of Texas at Austin in the 2023–24 NCAA Division I men's basketball season. They played their home games at the Moody Center in Austin, Texas as members of the Big 12 Conference. The Longhorns were led by first year head coach Rodney Terry.

The season was their last season in the Big 12 Conference for Texas as they joined the Southeastern Conference on July 1, 2024.

== Previous season ==
=== Season outlook ===
The 2022–23 season started off on a high note with wins against ranked Gonzaga and Creighton. On December 12, 2022, Head Coach Chris Beard was indefinitely suspended and later fired for a felony domestic abuse charge. These charges were later dropped. Associate head coach Rodney Terry served as interim head coach for the remainder of the season. The Longhorns finished the regular season 23–8, 12–6 in conference play. Texas won their first conference tournament championship since the 2021 season, second all-time, earning the conference's automatic bid. Ultimately, they made it all the way to the Elite Eight but lost to Miami (FL).

== Offseason ==
=== Returning players ===
Texas Returners
Name	Number	Pos.	Height	Weight	Year	Hometown
Alex Anamekwe	14	F	6'5"	200 lbs	Sophomore	McKinney, TX
Brock Cunningham	30	F	6'6"	210 lbs	Graduate Student	Austin, TX
Cole Bott	12	F	6'6"	195 lbs	Sophomore	Highlands Ranch, CO
Gavin Perryman	13	G	6'1"	185 lbs	Sophomore	Austin, TX
Preston Clark	20	F	6'6"	210 lbs	Sophomore	Austin, TX
Tyrese Hunter	4	G	6'0"	175 lbs	Junior	Racine, WI
Dylan Disu	1	F	6'9"	225 lbs	Senior	Pflugerville, TX

=== Departures ===
Texas Departures
Name	Number	Pos.	Height	Weight	Year	Hometown	Reason
Christian Bishop	32	F	6'7"	220 lbs	Senior	Lees Summit, MO	Graduated
Marcus Carr	5	G	6'2"	175 lbs	Graduate Student	Toronto, ON	Graduated
Sir'Jabari Rice	10	G	6'4"	180 lbs	Graduate Student	Houston, TX	Graduated
Timmy Allen	0	F	6'6"	210 lbs	Senior	Mesa, AZ	Graduated
Arterio Morris	2	G	6'3"	190 lbs	Sophomore	Dallas, TX	Transferred (Kansas)*
Rowan Brumbaugh	3	G	6'4"	190 lbs	Sophomore	Washington D.C.	Transferred (Georgetown)

*Arterio Morris transferred to Kansas but was later dismissed from the team.

=== Acquisitions ===
==== Incoming transfers ====
Texas incoming transfers
Name	Number	Pos.	Height	Weight	Year	Hometown	Previous School	Source
Chendall Weaver	2	G	6'3"	165 lbs	Sophomore	Mansfield, TX	UT Arlington	
Ithiel Horton	9	G	6'5"	200 lbs	Graduate Student	Roselle, NJ	UCF	
Kadin Shedrick	5	C	6'11"	200 lbs	Senior	Holly Springs, NC	Virginia	
Max Abmas	3	G	6'0"	175 lbs	Graduate Student	Dallas, TX	Oral Roberts	
Ze'rik Onyema	21	F	6'8"	230 lbs	Sophomore	El Paso, TX	UTEP	

==== 2023 recruiting class ====
College recruiting (2023)
Name	Hometown	School	Height	Weight	Commit date
Chris Johnson; PG	Missouri City, TX	Montverde Academy	6 ft 4 in (1.93 m)	180 lb (82 kg)	Jun 26, 2023
Chris Johnson; PG	Recruit ratings: Rivals: 247Sports: ESPN: (87)				
Devon Pryor; F	Houston, TX	PSAT Academy	6 ft 7 in (2.01 m)	180 lb (82 kg)	Jul 10, 2023
Devon Pryor; F	Recruit ratings: Rivals: 247Sports: ESPN: (N/A)				
Overall recruit ranking: Rivals: — 247Sports: 29 ESPN: —
Note: In many cases, Scout, Rivals, 247Sports, On3, and ESPN may conflict in their listings of height and weight.; In these cases, the average was taken. ESPN grades are on a 100-point scale.; Sources: "Texas 2023 Basketball Commitments". Rivals.; "2023 Texas Longhorns Recruiting Class". ESPN.; "2023 Team Ranking". Rivals.

==== Coaching staff additions ====
Name	Position	Previous Team	Previous Position	Source
Byron Jones	Assistant Coach	Troy	Assistant Coach	
Frank Haith	Assistant Coach	Memphis	Assistant Coach	

== Preseason ==
=== Award watch lists ===
Listed in the order that they were released

Award	Player	Position	Year	Source
Wooden Award	Max Abmas	G	Senior	
Bob Cousy Award	Max Abmas	G	Senior	

=== Big 12 media poll ===
Big 12 media poll
Predicted finish	Team	Votes (1st place)
1	Kansas	168 (12)
2	Houston	153 (2)
3	Texas	143
4	Baylor	137
5	TCU	113
6	Kansas State	106
7	Iowa State	95
8	Texas Tech	80
9	West Virginia	70
10	Oklahoma State	57
11	Cincinnati	55
12	Oklahoma	54
13	BYU	29
14	UCF	14

=== Preseason All-Big 12 teams ===
Position	Player	Class
First Team
G	Max Abmas	Senior

== Roster ==
2023–24 Texas Longhorns men's basketball team
Players
Coaches

Pos.	#	Name	Height	Weight	Year	Previous school	Hometown
G	0	Chris Johnson	6 ft 5 in (1.96 m)	180 lb (82 kg)	Fr	Montverde Academy	Missouri City, TX
F	1	Dylan Disu	6 ft 9 in (2.06 m)	225 lb (102 kg)	GS	Hendrickson; Vanderbilt	Pflugerville, TX
G	2	Chendall Weaver	6 ft 3 in (1.91 m)	180 lb (82 kg)	So	Mansfield Timberview; UT Arlington	Mansfield, TX
G	3	Max Abmas	6 ft 0 in (1.83 m)	175 lb (79 kg)	GS	Jesuit Prep; Oral Roberts	Rockwall, TX
G	4	Tyrese Hunter	6 ft 0 in (1.83 m)	175 lb (79 kg)	Jr	St. Catherine's; Iowa State	Racine, WI
F	5	Kadin Shedrick	6 ft 11 in (2.11 m)	231 lb (105 kg)	Sr	Holly Springs; Virginia	Holly Springs, NC
G	9	Ithiel Horton	6 ft 5 in (1.96 m)	200 lb (91 kg)	GS	Roselle Catholic; UCF	Vauxhall, NJ
F	12	Cole Bott (W)	6 ft 6 in (1.98 m)	195 lb (88 kg)	RS So	Northfield Mount Hermon School	Highlands Ranch, CO
G	13	Gavin Perryman (W)	6 ft 1 in (1.85 m)	185 lb (84 kg)	RS So	Dallas Jesuit	Dallas, TX
F	14	Alex Anamekwe	6 ft 5 in (1.96 m)	200 lb (91 kg)	So	McKinney High School	McKinney, TX
F	20	Preston Clark (W)	6 ft 6 in (1.98 m)	210 lb (95 kg)	RS Fr	Westlake	Austin, TX
F	21	Ze'Rik Onyema	6 ft 8 in (2.03 m)	235 lb (107 kg)	Jr	John Jay; UTEP	El Paso, TX
F	22	Devon Pryor	6 ft 7 in (2.01 m)	180 lb (82 kg)	Fr	PSAT-XEA Academy	Houston, TX
F	23	Dillon Mitchell	6 ft 8 in (2.03 m)	205 lb (93 kg)	So	Montverde Academy	Tampa, FL
G	24	Jackson Prince (W)	5 ft 10 in (1.78 m)	165 lb (75 kg)	Fr	Duncanville	Duncanville, TX
F	30	Brock Cunningham	6 ft 6 in (1.98 m)	210 lb (95 kg)	GS	Westlake	Austin, TX

Head coach

- Rodney Terry (St. Edward's)

Assistant coach(es)

- Frank Haith (Elon)
- Steve McClain (Chadron State)
- Brandon Chappell (Lamar)
- Byron Jones (Central Oklahoma)

Legend

- (C) Team captain
- (S) Suspended
- (I) Ineligible
- (W) Walk-on
- Injured
- Current redshirt

=== Roster outlook ===
Senior	Junior	Sophomore
Brock Cunningham — F Dylan Disu — F	Tyrese Hunter — G	Alex Anamekwe — F Cole Bott* — F Dillon Mitchell — F Gavin Perryman* — G Preston Clark — F

(*)Redshirt

== Schedule and results ==
Date time, TV	Rank^{#}	Opponent^{#}	Result	Record	High points	High rebounds	High assists	Site (attendance) city, state
Exhibition
October 30, 2023*; 7:00 p.m., LHN	No. 18	St. Edward's	W 84–63	0–0	22 – Hunter	9 – Mitchell	9 – Hunter	Moody Center (–); Austin, TX
Non-conference regular season
November 6, 2023*; 7:00 p.m., LHN	No. 18	Incarnate Word	W 88–56	1–0	17 – Horton	7 – Onyema	4 – Hunter	Moody Center (10,763); Austin, TX
November 10, 2023*; 7:00 p.m., LHN	No. 18	Delaware State	W 86–59	2–0	19 – Abmas	11 – Mitchell	5 – Tied	Moody Center (10,500); Austin, TX
November 15, 2023*; 8:00 p.m., LHN	No. 19	Rice	W 80–64	3–0	18 – Hunter	13 – Mitchell	4 – Tied	Moody Center (10,554); Austin, TX
November 19, 2023*; 2:30 p.m., ESPN	No. 19	vs. Louisville; Empire Classic semifinals	W 81–80	4–0	27 – Shedrick	9 – Cunningham	3 – Tied	Madison Square Garden (17,647); New York, NY
November 20, 2023*; 6:00 p.m., ESPNU	No. 15	vs. No. 5 UConn; Empire Classic final	L 71–81	4–1	21 – Mitchell	8 – Mitchell	7 – Hunter	Madison Square Garden (10,988); New York City, NY
November 26, 2023*; 2:00 p.m., LHN	No. 15	Wyoming	W 86–63	5–1	23 – Abmas	9 – Mitchell	3 – Abmas	Moody Center (9,926); Austin, TX
November 30, 2023*; 7:00 p.m., LHN	No. 16	Texas State	W 77–58	6–1	26 – Abmas	11 – Tied	6 – Abmas	Moody Center (10,533); Austin, TX
December 6, 2023*; 7:00 p.m., FS1	No. 12	at No. 8 Marquette; Big East–Big 12 Battle	L 65–86	6–2	25 – Abmas	10 – Mitchell	6 – Cunningham	Fiserv Forum (16,733); Milwaukee, WI
December 9, 2023*; 2:00 p.m., LHN	No. 12	Houston Christian	W 77–50	7–2	16 – Abmas	12 – Mitchell	7 – Abmas	Moody Center (10,418); Austin, TX
December 16, 2023*; 11:00 a.m., ESPN2	No. 19	vs. LSU; The Halal Guys Showcase	W 96–85	8–2	20 – Abmas	10 – Mitchell	7 – Abmas	Toyota Center (12,152); Houston, TX
December 22, 2023*; 2:00 p.m., LHN	No. 19	Texas A&M–Corpus Christi	W 71–55	9–2	17 – Abmas	13 – Mitchell	5 – Tied	Moody Center (10,704); Austin, TX
December 29, 2023*; 7:00 p.m., LHN	No. 21	UNC Greensboro	W 72–37	10–2	23 – Hunter	6 – Tied	7 – Hunter	Moody Center (10,616); Austin, TX
January 1, 2024*; 1:00 p.m., LHN	No. 20	UT Arlington	W 79–62	11–2	18 – Abmas	11 – Cunningham	7 – Abmas	Moody Center (10,713); Austin, TX
Big 12 regular season
January 6, 2024; 7:00 p.m., ESPN2	No. 20	Texas Tech	L 67–78	11–3 (0–1)	20 – Hunter	11 – Mitchell	5 – Abmas	Moody Center (10,641); Austin, TX
January 9, 2024; 6:00 p.m., ESPN+	No. 25	at Cincinnati	W 74–73	12–3 (1–1)	33 – Disu	6 – Disu	5 – Abmas	Fifth Third Arena (11,014); Cincinnati, OH
January 13, 2024; 5:00 p.m., ESPN+	No. 25	at West Virginia	L 73–76	12–4 (1–2)	32 – Abmas	8 – Onyema	3 – Abmas	WVU Coliseum (11,565); Morgantown, WV
January 17, 2024; 7:00 p.m., LHN		UCF	L 71–77	12–5 (1–3)	20 – Horton	9 – Mitchell	7 – Hunter	Moody Center (11,235); Austin, TX
January 20, 2024; 11:00 a.m., ESPN		No. 9 Baylor	W 75–73	13–5 (2–3)	21 – Hunter	6 – Mitchell	7 – Abmas	Moody Center (11,163); Austin, TX
January 23, 2024; 6:00 p.m., ESPN		at No. 11 Oklahoma	W 75–60	14–5 (3–3)	22 – Abmas	13 – Mitchell	4 – Disu	Lloyd Noble Center (11,092); Norman, OK
January 27, 2024; 1:00 p.m., ESPN2		at No. 21 BYU	L 72–84	14–6 (3–4)	19 – Disu	7 – Disu	6 – Hunter	Marriott Center (17,878); Provo, UT
January 29, 2024; 8:00 p.m., ESPN		No. 4 Houston	L 72–76 ^{OT}	14–7 (3–5)	20 – Abmas	10 – Mitchell	5 – Tied	Moody Center (11,313); Austin, TX
February 3, 2024; 1:00 p.m., ESPN2		at No. 25 TCU	W 77–66	15–7 (4–5)	21 – Abmas	11 – Mitchell	6 – Hunter	Schollmaier Arena (7,894); Fort Worth, TX
February 6, 2024; 7:00 p.m., LHN		No. 14 Iowa State	L 65–70	15–8 (4–6)	28 – Disu	10 – Disu	7 – Hunter	Moody Center (10,663); Austin, TX
February 10, 2024; 2:00 p.m., LHN		West Virginia	W 94–58	16–8 (5–6)	27 – Disu	8 – Mitchell	9 – Abmas	Moody Center (10,073); Austin, TX
February 17, 2024; 12:00 p.m., CBS		at No. 3 Houston	L 61–82	16–9 (5–7)	16 – Disu	7 – Disu	4 – Abmas	Fertitta Center (7,904); Houston, TX
February 19, 2024; 8:00 p.m., ESPN2		Kansas State	W 62–56	17–9 (6–7)	20 – Disu	10 – Mitchell	5 – Abmas	Moody Center (10,905); Austin, TX
February 24, 2024; 5:00 p.m., ESPN		at No. 9 Kansas	L 67–86	17–10 (6–8)	12 – Tied	5 – Weaver	4 – Hunter	Allen Fieldhouse (16,300); Lawrence, KS
February 27, 2024; 8:00 p.m., ESPN		at Texas Tech	W 81–69	18–10 (7–8)	21 – Disu	8 – Tied	4 – Abmas	United Supermarkets Arena (15,098); Lubbock, TX
March 2, 2024; 1:00 p.m., ESPN2		Oklahoma State	W 81–65	19–10 (8–8)	17 – Disu	7 – Cunningham	5 – Tied	Moody Center (10,485); Austin, TX
March 4, 2024; 8:00 p.m., ESPN		at No. 11 Baylor	L 85–93	19–11 (8–9)	33 – Abmas	9 – Horton	5 – Abmas	Ferrell Center (7,500); Waco, TX
March 9, 2024; 1:00 p.m., ESPN		Oklahoma	W 94–80	20–11 (9–9)	30 – Hunter	6 – Disu	7 – Hunter	Moody Center (11,073); Austin, TX
Big 12 tournament
March 13, 2024; 6:00 p.m., ESPN+	(7)	vs. (10) Kansas State; Second Round	L 74–78	20–12	26 – Abmas	9 – Disu	4 – Abmas	T-Mobile Center (18,261); Kansas City, MO
NCAA Tournament
March 21, 2024*; 5:50 p.m., TNT	(7 MW)	vs. (10 MW) Colorado State; First Round	W 56–44	21–12	12 – Tied	7 – Horton	2 – Hunter	Spectrum Center (18,037); Charlotte, NC
March 23, 2024*; 7:00 p.m., CBS	(7 MW)	vs. (2 MW) No. 6 Tennessee; Second Round	L 58–62	21–13	13 – Tied	8 – Abmas	2 – Tied	Spectrum Center (18,382); Charlotte, NC
*Non-conference game. ^{#}Rankings from AP Poll. (#) Tournament seedings in parentheses. MW=Midwest region. All times are in Central Time.

== Awards and honors ==
Weekly honors
Honors	Player	Position	Date Awarded	Ref.
Big 12 Player of the Week	Dylan Disu	F	February 12, 2024	
Big 12 Player of the Week	Tyrese Hunter	G	March 11, 2024	
Big 12 Newcomer of the Week	Max Abmas	G	December 18, 2023	
Big 12 Newcomer of the Week	Max Abmas	G	January 15, 2024	
Big 12 Newcomer of the Week	Chendall Weaver	G	March 4, 2024	

Conference honors
Honors	Player	Position
All-Big 12 First Team	Dylan Disu	F
All-Big 12 Second Team	Max Abmas	G
Big 12 All-Newcomer Team	Max Abmas	G

== Rankings ==
Ranking movements Legend: ██ Increase in ranking ██ Decrease in ranking — = Not ranked RV = Received votes
	Week																				
Poll	Pre	1	2	3	4	5	6	7	8	9	10	11	12	13	14	15	16	17	18	19	Final
AP	18	19	15	16	12	19	19	21	20	25	RV	RV	RV	RV	RV	—	—	RV	RV	RV	RV
Coaches	18	17	17	18	16	22	22	24	22	RV	RV	RV	RV	RV	—	—	—	—	—	—	RV
