= Fayetteville Academy =

American private school in North Carolina

Location
- 3200 Cliffdale Rd; Fayetteville, North Carolina 28303; United States; 35°03′46″N 78°56′28″W

Information
- Type: Private school, college preparatory
- Established: 1970 (56 years ago)
- Head of school: Norman "Blair" Fisher
- Faculty: 68
- Grades: PK–12
- Enrollment: 412 (2025)
- Colors: Blue and gold
- Athletics: Basketball, Soccer, Volleyball, Tennis, Cross Country, Cheerleading, Track, Golf, Swimming, Lacrosse
- Athletics conference: NCISAA Div-II
- Mascot: Eagle
- Affiliation: Nonsectarian
- Website: www.fayacademy.org

The Fayetteville Academy was established in 1970 as a coeducational secular private school in Cumberland County. The Head of School is N. Blair Fisher.

== Athletic facilities ==
The Norris Gymnasium was built in 1971 and is named for Oscar L. Norris, the Chairman of the original Board of Directors. The school also has a soccer field, a recently built tennis court along with a lacrosse field.
