= 2023–24 NCAA Division I men's basketball rankings =

Rankings for the 2023–24 NCAA Division I men's basketball season

- Season: 2023–24
- NCAA Tournament: 2024
- Preseason No. 1: Kansas
- NCAA Tournament Champions: UConn
NCAA Division I men's basketball rankings
| |

Two human polls make up the 2023–24 NCAA Division I men's basketball rankings, the AP Poll and the Coaches Poll, in addition to various publications' preseason polls.

== Legend ==
| | Increase in ranking |
| | Decrease in ranking |
| | New to rankings from previous week |
| | No movement from previous week |
| Italics | Number of first-place votes |
| (#–#) | Win–loss record |
| т | Tied with team above or below also with this symbol |

== AP Poll ==
| | Preseason Oct. 16 | Week 2 Nov. 13 | Week 3 Nov. 20 | Week 4 Nov. 27 | Week 5 Dec. 4 | Week 6 Dec. 11 | Week 7 Dec. 18 | Week 8 Dec. 25 | Week 9 Jan. 1 | Week 10 Jan. 8 | Week 11 Jan. 15 | Week 12 Jan. 22 | Week 13 Jan. 29 | Week 14 Feb. 5 | Week 15 Feb. 12 | Week 16 Feb. 19 | Week 17 Feb. 26 | Week 18 Mar. 4 | Week 19 Mar. 11 | Week 20 Mar. 18 | Final Apr. 9 | |
|---|---|---|---|---|---|---|---|---|---|---|---|---|---|---|---|---|---|---|---|---|---|---|
| 1. | Kansas (46) | Kansas (2–0) (51) | Kansas (3–0) (53) | Purdue (6–0) (60) | Arizona (7–0) (59) | Arizona (8–0) (62) | Purdue (10–1) (48) | Purdue (11–1) (46) | Purdue (12–1) (49) | Purdue (14–1) (54) | UConn (15–2) (39) | UConn (17–2) (44) | UConn (18–2) (48) | UConn (20–2) (45) | UConn (22–2) (45) | UConn (24–2) (62) | Houston (24–3) (53) | Houston (26–3) (52) | Houston (28–3) (52) | UConn (31–3) (61) | UConn (37–3) (58) | 1. |
| 2. | Duke (11) | Purdue (2–0) (7) | Purdue (3–0) (5) | Arizona (6–0) (1) | Kansas (7–1) (1) | Kansas (9–1) | Kansas (10–1) (6) | Kansas (11–1) (5) | Kansas (12–1) (5) | Houston (14–0) (7) | Purdue (15–2) (20) | Purdue (17–2) (17) | Purdue (19–2) (14) | Purdue (21–2) (16) | Purdue (22–2) (16) | Houston (22–3) | Purdue (25–3) (4) | UConn (26–3) (6) | UConn (28–3) (6) | Houston (30–4) (1) | Purdue (34–5) | 2. |
| 3. | Purdue (3) | Arizona (2–0) (3) | Arizona (5–0) (3) | Marquette (5–1) | Houston (8–0) (3) | Purdue (9–1) | Houston (11–0) (8) | Houston (12–0) (9) | Houston (13–0) (9) | Kansas (13–1) (2) | Kansas (14–2) (3) | North Carolina (15–3) | North Carolina (17–3) | North Carolina (18–4) | Houston (21–3) | Purdue (23–3) | UConn (25–3) (5) | Purdue (26–3) (4) | Purdue (28–3) (4) | Purdue (29–4) | Alabama (25–12)т | 3. |
| 4. | Michigan State (1) | Marquette (2–0) | Marquette (3–0) | UConn (6–0) (2) | Purdue (7–1) | Houston (10–0) (1) | Arizona (8–1) | Arizona (9–2) | UConn (11–2) | UConn (13–2) | North Carolina (13–3) (1) | Houston (16–2) | Houston (18–2) (1) | Kansas (18–4) | Marquette (18–5) | Arizona (20–5) | Tennessee (21–6) | Tennessee (23–6) | North Carolina (25–6) | Iowa State (27–7) | Houston (32–5)т | 4. |
| 5. | Marquette | UConn (2–0) (1) | UConn (4–0) (1) | Kansas (5–1) | UConn (7–1) | UConn (9–1) | UConn (10–1) | UConn (11–2) | Tennessee (9–3) | Tennessee (10–3) | Houston (14–2) | Tennessee (14–4) | Tennessee (15–4) | Houston (19–3) | Arizona (19–5) | Tennessee (19–6) | Marquette (21–6) | Arizona (23–6) | Tennessee (24–7) | North Carolina (27–7) | Tennessee (27–9) | 5. |
| 6. | UConn (2) | Houston (2–0) | Houston (6–0) | Houston (7–0) | Baylor (8–0) | Baylor (9–0) | Marquette (9–2) | Tennessee (9–3) | Kentucky (10–2) | Kentucky (11–2) | Tennessee (12–4) | Kentucky (14–3) | Wisconsin (16–4) | Tennessee (16–5) | Kansas (19–5) | Iowa State (20–5) | Arizona (21–6) | Iowa State (23–6) | Arizona (24–7) | Tennessee (24–8) | Illinois (29–9) | 6. |
| 7. | Houston | Tennessee (2–0) | Tennessee (3–0) | Duke (5–1) | Gonzaga (6–1) | Marquette (8–2) | Oklahoma (10–0) | Florida Atlantic (10–2) | Marquette (11–3) | North Carolina (11–3) | Duke (13–3) | Kansas (15–3) | Duke (15–4) | Marquette (17–5) | North Carolina (19–5) | Marquette (19–6) | Kansas (21–6) | North Carolina (23–6) | Iowa State (24–7) | Auburn (27–7) | North Carolina (29–8) | 7. |
| 8. | Creighton | Creighton (2–0) | Creighton (4–0) | Miami (FL) (5–0) | Marquette (6–2) | Creighton (8–1) | Tennessee (8–3) | Kentucky (9–2) | North Carolina (9–3) | Arizona (12–3) | Kentucky (12–3) | Auburn (16–2) | Kansas (16–4) | Arizona (17–5) | Tennessee (17–6) | Duke (20–5) | Iowa State (21–6) | Marquette (22–7) | Creighton (23–8) | Marquette (25–9) | Iowa State (29–8) | 8. |
| 9. | Tennessee | Duke (1–1) | Duke (3–1) | Baylor (6–0) | North Carolina (7–1) | North Carolina (7–2) | Kentucky (8–2) | North Carolina (8–3) | Illinois (10–2) | Oklahoma (13–1) | Baylor (14–2) | Arizona (14–4) | Marquette (15–5) | Duke (16–5) | Duke (18–5) | Kansas (20–6) | North Carolina (21–6) | Duke (23–6) | Kentucky (23–8) | Arizona (25–8) | Duke (27–9) | 9. |
| 10. | Florida Atlantic | Florida Atlantic (1–0) | Miami (FL) (5–0) | Tennessee (4–2) | Creighton (7–1) | Gonzaga (7–2) | Baylor (9–1) | Marquette (10–3) | Arizona (10–3) | Illinois (11–3) | Memphis (15–2) | Illinois (14–4) | Kentucky (15–4) | Illinois (17–5) | Iowa State (18–5) | North Carolina (20–6) | Duke (21–6) | Creighton (22–8) | Marquette (23–8) | Illinois (26–8) | NC State (26–15) | 10. |
| 11. | Gonzaga | Gonzaga (1–0) | Gonzaga (2–0) | Gonzaga (4–1) | Florida Atlantic (7–1) | Oklahoma (9–0) | North Carolina (7–3) | Illinois (9–2) | Oklahoma (12–1) | Marquette (11–4)т | Wisconsin (13–3) | Oklahoma (15–3) | Arizona (15–5) | Wisconsin (16–6) | South Carolina (21–3) | Baylor (19–6) | Auburn (21–6) | Baylor (21–8) | Duke (24–7) | Creighton (23–9) | Marquette (27–10) | 11. |
| 12. | Arizona | Miami (FL) (2–0) | Texas A&M (4–0) | Kentucky (5–1) | Texas (6–1) | Tennessee (6–3) | Creighton (9–2) | Oklahoma (10–1) | BYU (12–1) | Duke (11–3)т | Arizona (12–4) | Duke (13–4) | Iowa State (16–4) | Auburn (18–4) | Baylor (17–6) | Illinois (19–6) | Creighton (20–8) | Illinois (22–7) | Auburn (24–7) | Kentucky (23–9) | Arizona (27–9) | 12. |
| 13. | Miami (FL) | Texas A&M (2–0) | Baylor (4–0) | Florida Atlantic (5–1) | Colorado State (8–0) | Clemson (9–0) | Illinois (8–2) | Gonzaga (9–3) | Colorado State (12–1) | Memphis (13–2) | Auburn (14–2) | Wisconsin (14–4) | Creighton (16–5) | Baylor (16–5) | Auburn (19–5) | Alabama (18–7) | Illinois (20–7) | Auburn (22–7) | Illinois (23–8) | Duke (24–8) | Creighton (25–10) | 13. |
| 14. | Arkansas | Arkansas (2–0) | North Carolina (3–0) | Texas A&M (6–1) | BYU (7–0) | Kentucky (7–2) | Florida Atlantic (9–2) | BYU (11–1) | Duke (9–3) | Baylor (12–2) | Illinois (12–4) | Marquette (13–5) | Illinois (15–5) | Iowa State (16–5) | Illinois (17–6) | Auburn (20–6) | Alabama (19–8) | Kansas (21–8) | Baylor (22–8) | Baylor (23–10) | Clemson (24–12) | 14. |
| 15. | Texas A&M | Baylor (3–0) | Texas (4–0) | Creighton (5–1) | Miami (FL) (6–1) | Florida Atlantic (7–2) | Gonzaga (8–3) | Colorado State (11–1) | Memphis (11–2) | Wisconsin (11–3) | Oklahoma (13–3) | Baylor (14–4) | Texas Tech (16–3) | South Carolina (19–3) | Alabama (17–7) | Creighton (19–7) | Baylor (19–8) | Kentucky (21–8) | South Carolina (25–6) | Saint Mary's (26–7) | Gonzaga (27–8) | 15. |
| 16. | Kentucky | USC (2–0) | Kentucky (3–1) | Texas (5–1) | Kentucky (6–2) | Illinois (7–2) | Colorado State (10–1) | Duke (8–3) | Clemson (11–1) | Auburn (12–2) | Utah State (16–1) | Dayton (15–2) | Auburn (16–4) | Alabama (16–6) | Dayton (19–4) | Dayton (21–4) | Kentucky (19–8) | Alabama (20–9) | Kansas (22–9) | South Carolina (26–7) | Baylor (24–11) | 16. |
| 17. | San Diego State | Kentucky (2–0) | Alabama (4–0) | North Carolina (5–1) | Tennessee (4–3) | Colorado State (9–1) | BYU (10–1) | Baylor (10–2) | Florida Atlantic (10–3) | Colorado State (13–2) | Marquette (11–5) | Creighton (14–5) | Utah State (18–2) | Kentucky (15–6) | Creighton (17–7) | Kentucky (18–7) | Saint Mary's (23–6) | South Carolina (24–5) | Gonzaga (24–6) | Kansas (22–10) | San Diego State (26–11) | 17. |
| 18. | Texas | Michigan State (1–1) | Colorado (3–0) | Villanova (6–1) | James Madison (8–0) | BYU (8–1) | Clemson (9–1) | Clemson (10–1) | Baylor (10–2) | BYU (12–2) | Creighton (13–4) | Utah State (17–2) | Baylor (14–5) | Dayton (18–3) | Saint Mary's (20–6) | Saint Mary’s (21–6) | South Carolina (22–5) | Washington State (23–7) | Utah State (26–5) | Gonzaga (25–7) | Auburn (27–8) | 18. |
| 19. | North Carolina | Texas (2–0) | Florida Atlantic (2–1) | BYU (6–0) | Oklahoma (7–0) | Texas (7–2) | Texas (8–2) | Memphis (10–2) | James Madison (13–0) | San Diego State (13–2) | TCU (13–3) | Memphis (15–4) | New Mexico (18–3) | Creighton (16–6) | BYU (17–6) | San Diego State (20–6) | Washington State (21–7) | Gonzaga (24–6) | Alabama (21–10) | Alabama (21–11) | Kansas (23–11) | 19. |
| 20. | Baylor | North Carolina (2–0) | Arkansas (3–1) | Colorado State (6–0) | Illinois (6–1) | James Madison (9–0) | James Madison (10–0) | James Madison (12–0) | Texas (10–2) | Utah State (14–1) | BYU (13–3) | Texas Tech (15–3) | Florida Atlantic (17–4) | Florida Atlantic (18–4) | Wisconsin (16–8) | South Carolina (21–5) | San Diego State (21–7) | BYU (21–8) | BYU (22–9) | Utah State (27–6) | Kentucky (23–10) | 20. |
| 21. | USC | Villanova (2–0) | Michigan State (3–2) | Mississippi State (6–0) | Texas A&M (6–2) | Duke (6–3) | Duke (7–3) | Texas (9–2) | Wisconsin (9–3) | Clemson (11–3) | Dayton (13–2) | BYU (14–4) | Dayton (16–3) | BYU (16–5) | Virginia (19–5) | Washington State (20–6) | Dayton (21–5) | San Diego State (22–7) | Saint Mary's (24–7) | BYU (23–10) | Saint Mary's (26–8) | 21. |
| 22. | Villanova | Alabama (2–0) | James Madison (4–0) | James Madison (6–0) | Duke (5–3) | Virginia (8–1) | Virginia (9–1) | Creighton (9–3) | Ole Miss (13–0) | Creighton (11–4) | Ole Miss (15–1) | Florida Atlantic (15–4) | BYU (15–5) | Utah State (19–3) | Kentucky (16–7) | Colorado State (20–6) | Utah State (22–5) | Utah State (24–5) | Washington State (23–8) | Texas Tech (23–10) | Utah State (28–7) | 22. |
| 23. | Saint Mary's | Illinois (2–0) | USC (3–1) | Alabama (5–1) | Wisconsin (6–2) | Wisconsin (7–3) | Memphis (8–2) | Wisconsin (9–3) | Providence (11–2) | Gonzaga (11–4) | Florida Atlantic (13–4) | Iowa State (14–4) | Oklahoma (15–5) | Texas Tech (16–5) | Indiana State (22–3) | Texas Tech (18–7) | Gonzaga (22–6) | Saint Mary's (24–7) | Nevada (26–6) | Wisconsin (22–13) | Washington State (25–10) | 23. |
| 24. | Alabama | James Madison (3–0) | Virginia (4–0) | Illinois (5–1) | Clemson (7–0) | Miami (FL) (7–2) | Wisconsin (8–3) | Ole Miss (12–0) | Gonzaga (9–4) | Florida Atlantic (11–4) | Iowa State (13–3) | Colorado State (15–3) | Alabama (14–6) | San Diego State (17–5) | Florida Atlantic (19–5) | Florida (18–7) | Florida (19–8) | South Florida (22–5) | Dayton (24–6) | San Diego State (24–10) | Dayton (25–8) | 24. |
| 25. | Illinois | Colorado (2–0) | Mississippi State (5–0) | Oklahoma (6–0) | San Diego State (7–1) | Northwestern (7–1) | Ole Miss (10–0) | Providence (11–2) | Auburn (10–2) | Texas (11–3) | Texas Tech (14–2) | New Mexico (16–3) | TCU (15–5) | New Mexico (18–4) | Oklahoma (18–6) | BYU (18–7) | South Florida (21–5) | Dayton (22–6) | Texas Tech (22–9) | Washington State (24–9) | South Carolina (26–8) | 25. |
| | Preseason Oct. 16 | Week 2 Nov. 13 | Week 3 Nov. 20 | Week 4 Nov. 27 | Week 5 Dec. 4 | Week 6 Dec. 11 | Week 7 Dec. 18 | Week 8 Dec. 25 | Week 9 Jan. 1 | Week 10 Jan. 8 | Week 11 Jan. 15 | Week 12 Jan. 22 | Week 13 Jan. 29 | Week 14 Feb. 5 | Week 15 Feb. 12 | Week 16 Feb. 19 | Week 17 Feb. 26 | Week 18 Mar. 4 | Week 19 Mar. 11 | Week 20 Mar. 18 | Final Apr. 9 | |
| | | Dropped: San Diego State (1−1); Saint Mary's (2−1) | Dropped: Villanova (3–1); Illinois (4–1) | Dropped: Colorado (5–1); Arkansas (4–3); Michigan State (3–3); USC (4–2); Virginia (5–1) | Dropped: Villanova (6–3); Mississippi State (6–2); Alabama (5–2) | Dropped: Texas A&M (7–3); San Diego State (8–2) | Dropped: Miami (FL) (8–2); Northwestern (8–2) | Dropped: Virginia (9–2) | Dropped: Creighton (9–4) | Dropped: James Madison (14–1); Ole Miss (13–1); Providence (11–4) | Dropped: Colorado State (13–3); San Diego State (14–3); Clemson (12–4); Gonzaga (11–5); Texas (12–4) | Dropped: TCU (13–5); Ole Miss (15–3) | Dropped: Memphis (15–5); Colorado State (15–5) | Dropped: Oklahoma (16–6); TCU (16–6) | Dropped: Utah State (20–4); Texas Tech (17–6); San Diego State (18–6); New Mexico (19–5) | Dropped: Wisconsin (17–9); Virginia (20–6); Indiana State (22–5); Florida Atlantic (20–6); Oklahoma (18–8) | Dropped: Colorado State (20–8); Texas Tech (19–8); BYU (19–8) | Dropped: Florida (20–9) | Dropped: San Diego State (22–9); South Florida (23–6) | Dropped: Nevada (26–7); Dayton (24–7) | Dropped: BYU (23–11); Texas Tech (23–11); Wisconsin (22–14) | |

== USA Today Coaches Poll ==
| | Preseason Oct. 16 | Week 2 Nov. 13 | Week 3 Nov. 20 | Week 4 Nov. 27 | Week 5 Dec. 4 | Week 6 Dec. 11 | Week 7 Dec. 18 | Week 8 Dec. 26 | Week 9 Jan. 2 | Week 10 Jan. 8 | Week 11 Jan. 15 | Week 12 Jan. 22 | Week 13 Jan. 29 | Week 14 Feb. 5 | Week 15 Feb. 12 | Week 16 Feb. 19 | Week 17 Feb. 26 | Week 18 Mar. 4 | Week 19 Mar. 11 | Week 20 Mar. 17 | Final Apr. 9 | |
|---|---|---|---|---|---|---|---|---|---|---|---|---|---|---|---|---|---|---|---|---|---|---|
| 1. | Kansas (23) | Kansas (2–0) (25) | Kansas (3–0) (25) | Purdue (6–0) (32) | Arizona (7–0) (26) | Arizona (8–0) (28) | Purdue (10–1) (20) | Purdue (11–1) (24) | Purdue (12–1) (23) | Purdue (14–1) (21) | UConn (15–2) (20) | UConn (17–2) (24) | UConn (18–2) (23) | UConn (20–2) (25) | UConn (22–2) (24) | UConn (24–2) (32) | Houston (24–3) (25) | Houston (26–3) (28) | Houston (28–3) (29) | UConn (31–3) (32) | UConn (37–3) (31) | 1. |
| 2. | Purdue (5) | Purdue (2–0) (3) | Purdue (3–0) (5) | Arizona (6–0) | Houston (8–0) (5) | Kansas (9–1) (1) | Kansas (10–1) (3) | Kansas (11–1) (1) | Kansas (12–1) (1) | Houston (14–0) (10) | Purdue (15–2) (12) | Purdue (17–2) (8) | Purdue (19–2) (8) | Purdue (21–2) (7) | Purdue (22–2) (8) | Houston (22–3) | UConn (25–3) (3) | UConn (26–3) (3) | UConn (28–3) | Houston (30–4) | Purdue (34–5) | 2. |
| 3. | Duke (3) | Arizona (2–0) (3) | Arizona (5–0) (2) | Marquette (5–1) | Kansas (7–1) (1) | Houston (10–0) (3) | Houston (11–0) (9) | Houston (12–0) (7) | Houston (13–0) (8) | Kansas (13–1) (1) | North Carolina (13–3) | North Carolina (15–3) | North Carolina (17–3) | North Carolina (18–4) | Houston (21–3) | Purdue (23–3) | Purdue (25–3) (4) | Purdue (26–3) (1) | Purdue (28–3) (2) | Purdue (29–4) | Houston (32–5) | 3. |
| 4. | Michigan State | UConn (2–0) | UConn (4–0) | UConn (6–0) | Purdue (7–1) | Purdue (9–1) | Arizona (8–1) | Arizona (9–2) | UConn (11–2) | UConn (13–2) | Kansas (14–2) | Houston (16–2) | Houston (18–2) | Kansas (18–4) | Marquette (18–5) | Arizona (20–5) | Tennessee (21–6) | Tennessee (23–6) | North Carolina (25–6) | Iowa State (27–7) | Alabama (25–12) | 4. |
| 5. | UConn (1) | Marquette (2–0) | Marquette (3–0) | Houston (7–0) | UConn (7–1) | UConn (9–1) | UConn (10–1) | UConn (11–2) | Tennessee (9–3) | Tennessee (11–3) | Houston (14–2) | Tennessee (14–4) | Tennessee (15–4) | Houston (19–3) | North Carolina (19–5) | Tennessee (19–6) | Marquette (21–6) | Arizona (23–6) | Tennessee (24–7) | North Carolina (27–7) | Tennessee (27–9) | 5. |
| 6. | Houston | Houston (2–0) | Houston (6–0) | Kansas (5–1) | Baylor (8–0) | Baylor (9–0) | Marquette (9–2) | Florida Atlantic (10–2) | Kentucky (10–2) | Kentucky (11–2) | Duke (13–3) | Kentucky (14–3) т | Wisconsin (16–4) | Tennessee (16–5) | Arizona (19–5) | Iowa State (20–5) | Iowa State (21–6) | Iowa State (23–6) | Creighton (23–8) | Tennessee (24–8) | North Carolina (29–8) | 6. |
| 7. | Marquette | Creighton (2–0) | Creighton (4–0) | Duke (5–1) | Marquette (6–2) | Marquette (8–2) | Tennessee (8–3) | Tennessee (9–3) | Marquette (11–3) | North Carolina (11–3) | Tennessee (12–4) | Auburn (16–2) т | Duke (15–4) | Marquette (17–5) | Kansas (19–5) | Duke (20–5) | Arizona (21–6) | North Carolina (23–6) | Arizona (24–7) | Auburn (27–7) | Illinois (29–9) | 7. |
| 8. | Creighton | Tennessee (2–0) | Tennessee (3–0) | Miami (FL) (5–0) | Gonzaga (6–1) | Creighton (8–1) | Oklahoma (10–0) | Marquette (10–3) | Illinois (10–2) | Arizona (12–3) | Wisconsin (13–3) | Kansas (15–2) | Kentucky (15–4) | Arizona (17–5) | Duke (18–5) | Marquette (19–6) | North Carolina (21–6) | Duke (23–6) | Iowa State (24–7) | Marquette (25–9) | Iowa State (29–8) | 8. |
| 9. | Florida Atlantic | Duke (1–0) | Duke (3–1) | Baylor (6–0) | Florida Atlantic (7–1) | North Carolina (7–2) | Kentucky (8–2) | Illinois (9–2) | North Carolina (9–3) | Oklahoma (13–1) | Baylor (14–2) | Arizona (14–4) | Kansas (16–4) | Wisconsin (16–6) | Tennessee (17–6) | North Carolina (20–6) | Kansas (21–6) | Marquette (22–7) | Kentucky (23–8) | Arizona (25–8) | Duke (27–9) | 9. |
| 10. | Tennessee | Florida Atlantic (1–0) | Gonzaga (2–0) | Gonzaga (4–1) | North Carolina (7–1) | Tennessee (6–3) | Baylor (9–1) | Kentucky (9–2) | Arizona (10–3) | Illinois (11–3) | Kentucky (12–3) | Wisconsin (14–4) | Marquette (15–5) | Duke (16–5) | Iowa State (18–5) | Kansas (20–6) | Duke (21–6) | Creighton (22–8) | Marquette (23–8) | Illinois (26–8) | Creighton (25–10) | 10. |
| 11. | Arizona | Miami (FL) (2–0) | Miami (FL) (5–0) | Tennessee (4–2) | Creighton (7–1) | Clemson (9–0) | Illinois (8–2) | North Carolina (8–3) | Oklahoma (12–1) | Duke (11–3) | Auburn (14–2) | Illinois (14–4) | Iowa State (16–4) | Auburn (18–4) | South Carolina (21–3) | Baylor (19–6) | Auburn (21–6) | Baylor (21–8) | Duke (24–7) | Creighton (23–9) | Marquette (27–10) | 11. |
| 12. | Gonzaga | Gonzaga (1–0) | Baylor (4–0) | Kentucky (5–1) | Colorado State (8–0) | Oklahoma (9–0) | Florida Atlantic (9–2) | BYU (11–1) | BYU (12–1) | Marquette (11–4) | Memphis (15–2) | Duke (13–4) | Arizona (15–5) | Illinois (17–5) | Auburn (19–5) | Illinois (19–6) | Creighton (20–8) | Illinois (22–7) | Auburn (24–7) | Kentucky (23–9) | Arizona (27–9) | 12. |
| 13. | Miami (FL) | Baylor (3–0) | Texas A&M (4–0) | Texas A&M (6–1) | Tennessee (4–3) т | Gonzaga (7–2) | North Carolina (7–3) | Oklahoma (10–1) | Duke (9–3) | Memphis (13–2) | Arizona (12–4) | Oklahoma (15–3) | Creighton (16–5) | Baylor (16–5) | Baylor (17–6) | Alabama (18–7) | Alabama (19–8) | Kentucky (21–8) | Baylor (22–9) | Baylor (23–10) | NC State (26–15) | 13. |
| 14. | Arkansas | Arkansas (2–0) | North Carolina (3–0) | Creighton (5–1) | BYU (7–0) т | Florida Atlantic (7–2) | Creighton (9–2) | Colorado State (11–1) | Colorado State (12–1) | Baylor (12–2) | Illinois (12–4) | Baylor (14–4) | Illinois (15–5) | Iowa State (16–5) | Illinois (17–6) | Auburn (20–6) | Baylor (19–8) | Auburn (22–7) | Illinois (23–8) | Duke (24–8) | Baylor (24–11) | 14. |
| 15. | San Diego State | Texas A&M (2–0) | Alabama (4–0) | Villanova (6–1) | Miami (FL) (6–1) | Kentucky (7–2) | BYU (10–1) | Duke (8–3) | Memphis (11–2) | Wisconsin (11–3) | Creighton (13–4) | Marquette (13–5) | Texas Tech (16–3) | Kentucky (15–6) | Alabama (17–7) | Creighton (19–7) | Kentucky (19–8) | Kansas (21–8) | Gonzaga (24–6) | Saint Mary's (26–7) | Clemson (24–12) | 15. |
| 16. | Kentucky | Kentucky (2–0) | Kentucky (3–1) | North Carolina (5–1) | Texas (6–1) | Illinois (7–2) | Gonzaga (8–3) | Gonzaga (9–3) | Clemson (11–1) | Auburn (12–2) | Oklahoma (13–3) | Creighton (14–5) | Auburn (16–4) | Alabama (16–6) | Creighton (17–7) | Dayton (21–4) | Illinois (20–7) | South Carolina (24–5) | South Carolina (25–6) | Gonzaga (25–7) | Gonzaga (27–8) | 16. |
| 17. | Baylor | Texas (2–0) | Texas (4–0) | Florida Atlantic (5–1) | Kentucky (6–2) | BYU (8–1) | Colorado State (10–1) | Clemson (10–1) | Florida Atlantic (10–3) | BYU (12–2) | Utah State (16–1) | Dayton (15–2) | Utah State (18–2) | Dayton (18–3) | BYU (17–6) | Kentucky (18–7) | St. Mary's (23–6) | Alabama (20–9) | Kansas (22–9) | South Carolina (26–7) | Auburn (27–8) | 17. |
| 18. | Texas | North Carolina (2–0) | Virginia (4–0) | Texas (5–1) | Illinois (6–1) | Colorado State (9–1) | Clemson (9–1) | Memphis (10–2) | Baylor (10–2) | Colorado State (13–2) | Marquette (11–5) | Iowa State (14–4) | Baylor (14–5) | Creighton (16–6) | Dayton (19–4) | Saint Mary's (21–6) | South Carolina (22–5) | Gonzaga (24–6) | Utah State (26–5) | Alabama (21–11) | San Diego State (26–11) | 18. |
| 19. | Texas A&M | Michigan State (1–1) | Michigan State (3–2) | BYU (6–0) | Texas A&M (6–2) | Duke (6–3) | Duke (7–3) | Baylor (10–2) | Ole Miss (13–0) | San Diego State (13–2) | BYU (13–3) | BYU (14–4) | Dayton (16–3) | BYU (16–5) | Saint Mary's (20–6) | San Diego State (21–6) | San Diego State (21–7) | San Diego State (22–7) | Alabama (21–10) | Utah State (27–6) | Kentucky (23–10) | 19. |
| 20. | Villanova | USC (2–0) | Florida Atlantic (2–1) | Alabama (5–1) | Clemson (7–0) | James Madison (9–0) | Virginia (9–1) | Creighton (9–3) | James Madison (13–0) | Creighton (11–4) | Iowa State (13–3) | Utah State (17–2) | New Mexico (18–3) | South Carolina (19–3) | Kentucky (16–7) | South Carolina (21–5) | Dayton (21–5) | Washington State (23–7) | Saint Mary's (24–7) | Kansas (22–10) | Utah State (28–7) | 20. |
| 21. | North Carolina | Villanova (2–0) | Colorado (3–0) | Colorado State (6–0) | Duke (5–3) | Virginia (8–1) | James Madison (10–0) | James Madison (12–0) | Wisconsin (9–3) | Gonzaga (11–4) | Ole Miss (15–1) | Texas Tech (15–3) | BYU (15–5) | Utah State (19–3) | Wisconsin (16–8) т | BYU (18–7) | Washington State (21–7) | Saint Mary's (24–7) | BYU (22–9) | BYU (23–10) | Kansas (23–11) | 21. |
| 22. | USC | Alabama (2–0) | Illinois (4–1) | Mississippi State (6–0) | Oklahoma (7–0) | Texas (7–2) | Texas (8–2) | Ole Miss (12–0) | Texas (10–2) | Clemson (11–3) | TCU (13–3) | Memphis (15–4) | Alabama (14–6) | Florida Atlantic (18–4) | Oklahoma (18–6) т | Washington State (20–6) | Gonzaga (22–6) | Utah State (24–5) | Nevada (26–6) | Texas Tech (23–10) | Saint Mary's (26–8) | 22. |
| 23. | Saint Mary's | Illinois (2–0) | Memphis (3–0) | James Madison (6–0) | Virginia (7–1) | Wisconsin (7–3) | Memphis (8–2) | Wisconsin (9–3) | Providence (11–2) | Utah State (14–1) | Dayton (13–2) | Colorado State (15–3) | Florida Atlantic (17–4) | Texas Tech (16–5) | Virginia (19–5) | Texas Tech (18–7) | Utah State (22–5) | BYU (21–8) | Texas Tech (22–9) | Florida (24–11) | South Carolina (26–8) | 23. |
| 24. | Alabama | Saint Mary’s (2–1) | UCLA (3–0) | Illinois (5–1) | James Madison (8–0) | Miami (FL) (7–2) | Wisconsin (8–3) | Texas (9–2) | Auburn (10–2) | Ole Miss (13–1) | San Diego State (14–3) | Florida Atlantic (15–4) | Oklahoma (15–5) | San Diego State (17–5) | Indiana State (22–3) | Colorado State (20–6) | Florida (19–8) | South Florida (22–5) | Dayton (24–6) | Wisconsin (22–13) | Washington State (25–10) | 24. |
| 25. | UCLA | Virginia (2–0) т UCLA (2–0) т | Mississippi State (5–0) | Michigan State (3–3) | Ohio State (7–1) | Ole Miss (9–0) | Ole Miss (10–0) | Providence (11–2) | Gonzaga (9–4) | Florida Atlantic (11–4) | Texas Tech (14–2) | New Mexico (16–3) | TCU (15–5) | New Mexico (18–4) | Colorado State (19–5) | TCU (18–7) | South Florida (21–5) | Florida (20–9) | Washington State (23–8) | San Diego State (24–10) | Texas Tech (23–11) | 25. |
| | Preseason Oct. 16 | Week 2 Nov. 13 | Week 3 Nov. 20 | Week 4 Nov. 27 | Week 5 Dec. 4 | Week 6 Dec. 11 | Week 7 Dec. 18 | Week 8 Dec. 26 | Week 9 Jan. 2 | Week 10 Jan. 8 | Week 11 Jan. 15 | Week 12 Jan. 22 | Week 13 Jan. 29 | Week 14 Feb. 5 | Week 15 Feb. 12 | Week 16 Feb. 19 | Week 17 Feb. 26 | Week 18 Mar. 4 | Week 19 Mar. 11 | Week 20 Mar. 17 | Final Apr. 9 | |
| | | Dropped: San Diego State (1–1) | Dropped: Arkansas (3–1); USC (3–1); Villanova (3–1); Saint Mary's (2–2) | Dropped: Virginia (5–1); Colorado (5–1); Memphis (5–1); UCLA (4–2) | Dropped: Villanova (6–3); Alabama (5–2); Mississippi State (6–2); Michigan State (4–3) | Dropped: Texas A&M (7–3); Ohio State (8–2) | Dropped: Miami (FL) (8–2) | Dropped: Virginia (9–2) | Dropped: Creighton (9–4) | Dropped: James Madison (14–1); Texas (11–3); Providence (11–4) | Dropped: Colorado State (13–3); Gonzaga (11–5); Clemson (12–4); Florida Atlantic (13–4) | Dropped: Ole Miss (15–3); TCU (13–5); San Diego State (15–4) | Dropped: Memphis (15–5); Colorado State (15–5) | Dropped: Oklahoma (16–6); TCU (16–6) | Dropped: Utah State (20–4); Florida Atlantic (19–5); Texas Tech (17–6); San Diego State (18–6); New Mexico (19–5) | Dropped: Oklahoma (18–8); Wisconsin (17–9); Virginia (20–6); Indiana State (22–5) | Dropped: BYU (19–8); Texas Tech (19–8); Colorado State (20–8); TCU (19–8) | Dropped: Dayton (22–6) | Dropped: San Diego State (22–9); South Florida (23–6); Florida (21–10) | Dropped: Nevada (26–7); Dayton (24–7); Washington State (24–9) | Dropped: BYU (23–11); Florida (24–12); Wisconsin (22–14) | |

== See also ==
- 2023–24 NCAA Division I women's basketball rankings
