= 2020 Maui Invitational =

Early-season American college basketball tournament

2020 Maui Invitational Tournament
- Season: 2020–21
- Teams: 8
- Finals site: Harrah's Cherokee Center, Asheville, North Carolina
- Champions: Texas (1st title)
- Runner-up: North Carolina (7th title game)
- Semifinalists: Indiana (3rd semifinal); Stanford (1st semifinal)
- Winning coach: Shaka Smart (1st title)
- MVP: Matt Coleman III (Texas)

The 2020 Camping World Maui Invitational Tournament was an early-season college basketball tournament played for the 37th time. The tournament began in 1984, and was part of the 2020–21 NCAA Division I men's basketball season. The championship round of the tournament was played at the Harrah's Cherokee Center in Asheville, North Carolina from November 30–December 2, 2020. Due to COVID-19 concerns, the championship round of the tournament was moved from its normal location of Lahaina Civic Center in Maui, Hawaii.

A four-team early-season tournament, the Asheville Championship, has been held at the Asheville Civic Center since 2021, buoyed by the city's holding of the 2020 Camping World Maui Invitational.

== Bracket ==
5th Place Game; Wednesday, December 2
Providence	71
Alabama	88
7th Place Game
Davidson	77
UNLV	73

Consolation 2nd Round; Tuesday, December 1
Davidson	62
Providence	63
UNLV	74
Alabama	86

First Round; Monday, November 30
17	Texas	78
Davidson	76
Indiana	79
Providence	58
14	North Carolina	78
UNLV	51
Stanford	82
Alabama	64

Semifinals; Tuesday, December 1
17	Texas	66
Indiana	44
14	North Carolina	67
Stanford	63

Championship; Wednesday, December 2
17	Texas	69
14	North Carolina	67
3rd Place Game
Indiana	79
Stanford	63
