= 2020–21 Big 12 Conference men's basketball season =

2020–21 Big 12 Men's Basketball Season
- League: NCAA Division I
- Sport: Basketball
- Teams: 10
- TV partner(s): CBS, ESPN, FSN

NBA Draft
- 2021 Big 12 Champions: Baylor
- Runners-up: Kansas
- Season MVP: Cade Cunningham, Oklahoma State
- Top scorer: Cade Cunningham, Oklahoma State

Big 12 tournament
- Champions: Texas
- Runners-up: Oklahoma State
- Finals MVP: Matt Coleman III

Big 12 Basketball seasons
- ← 2019–20 2021–22 →

2020–21 Big 12 men's basketball standings
	Conf.				Overall
Team	W		L	PCT	W		L	PCT
No. 1 Baylor	13	–	1	.929	28	–	2	.933
No. 16 Kansas	12	–	6	.667	21	–	9	.700
No. 21 Texas †	11	–	6	.647	19	–	8	.704
No. 18 West Virginia	11	–	6	.647	19	–	10	.655
No. 19 Oklahoma State	11	–	7	.611	21	–	9	.700
No. 22 Texas Tech	9	–	8	.529	18	–	11	.621
Oklahoma	9	–	8	.529	16	–	11	.593
TCU	5	–	11	.313	12	–	14	.462
Kansas State	4	–	14	.222	9	–	20	.310
Iowa State	0	–	18	.000	2	–	22	.083
† 2021 Big 12 Tournament winner Rankings from AP poll

The 2020–21 Big 12 men's basketball season began with practices in October 2020, followed by the start of the 2020–21 NCAA Division I men's basketball season in November. Regular season conference play began in December 2020 and concluded in March 2021. The Big 12 tournament was held from March 11–14, 2021 and was played at the T-Mobile Center in Kansas City, Missouri. Baylor won their first ever National Championship, becoming the first Big 12 team to win the National Championship since Kansas in 2008.

== Coaches ==
=== Coaching changes ===
There were no head coaching changes following the 2019–20 Big 12 Conference men's basketball season.

=== Head coaches ===
Note: Stats are through the beginning of the season. All stats and records are from time at current school only.

Team	Head coach	Previous job	Seasons at school	Overall record	Big 12 record	NCAA tournaments	NCAA Final Fours	NCAA Championships
Baylor	Scott Drew	Valparaiso	17th	342–213 (.616)	140–150 (.483)	8	0	0
Iowa State	Steve Prohm	Murray State	6th	95–73 (.565)	40–50 (.444)	3	0	0
Kansas	Bill Self	Illinois	18th	501–109 (.821)	236–53 (.817)	16	3	1
Kansas State	Bruce Weber	Illinois	9th	161–110 (.594)	72–72 (.500)	5	0	0
Oklahoma	Lon Kruger	UNLV	10th	179–117 (.605)	81–81 (.500)	7	1	0
Oklahoma State	Mike Boynton	Oklahoma State (asst.)	4th	51–49 (.510)	20–34 (.370)	0	0	0
TCU	Jamie Dixon	Pittsburgh	5th	84–57 (.596)	29–43 (.403)	1	0	0
Texas	Shaka Smart	VCU	6th	90–78 (.536)	40–50 (.444)	2	0	0
Texas Tech	Chris Beard	Little Rock	5th	94–44 (.681)	40–32 (.556)	2	1	0
West Virginia	Bob Huggins	Kansas State	14th	289–158 (.647)	127–102 (.555)	9	1	0

== Preseason ==
=== Recruiting classes ===
Rankings
Team	ESPN	Rivals	Scout/247 Sports	Signees
Baylor	No. 22	No. 42	No. 28	3
Iowa State	No. 18	No. 37	No. 29	4
Kansas	No. 25	No. 17	No. 22	4
Kansas State	-	No. 19	No. 35	7
Oklahoma	-	No. 86	No. 85	2
Oklahoma State	No.8	No. 4	No. 13	6
TCU	-	No. 66	No. 52	3
Texas	-	No. 57	No. 96	1
Texas Tech	No. 14	No. 10	No. 10	5
West Virginia	-	No. 61	No. 51	4

=== Preseason watchlists ===
Below is a table of notable preseason watch lists.

	Wooden	Naismith	Cousy	West	Erving	Malone	Abdul-Jabbar
Jared Butler, Baylor	✓	✓	✓				
MaCio Teague, Baylor	✓	✓		✓			
Marcus Garrett, Kansas	✓	✓	✓				
Cade Cunningham, Oklahoma State	✓	✓	✓				
Greg Brown, Texas	✓	✓				✓	
Oscar Tshiebwe, West Virginia	✓	✓				✓	
Matt Coleman III, Texas			✓				
Ochai Agbaji, Kansas				✓			
Terrence Shannon Jr., Texas Tech					✓		
Mark Vital, Baylor						✓	
Brady Manek, Oklahoma						✓	
Derek Culver, West Virginia							✓

Big 12 Preseason Poll

	Big 12 Coaches	Points
1.	Baylor (7)	79
2.	Kansas (3)	73
3.	West Virginia	61
4.	Texas	58
5.	Texas Tech	53
6.	Oklahoma	39
7.	Oklahoma State	35
8.	Iowa State	19
9.	TCU	18
10.	Kansas State	15
Reference: (#) first place votes

Pre-Season All-Big 12 Team

Big 12 Coaches
Jared Butler †, G Baylor
Marcus Garrett †, G Kansas
Austin Reaves, G Oklahoma
Cade Cunningham, G Oklahoma State
Matt Coleman III, G Texas
Oscar Tshiebwe, F West Virginia
† denotes unanimous selection

- Player of the Year: Jared Butler, Baylor
- Newcomer of the Year: Marcus Santos-Silva, Texas Tech
- Freshman of the Year: Cade Cunningham, Oklahoma State

=== Preseason national polls ===
	AP	Athlon; Sports	Blue Ribbon; Yearbook	CBS Sports	Coaches	ESPN	Kenpom	SBNation	Sports; Illustrated
Baylor	2	1	3	3	1	1	1	2	1
Iowa State							67		
Kansas	6	5	6	6	5	9	5	6	7
Kansas State							113		
Oklahoma		17		38			31		
Oklahoma State				35	RV		33		
TCU							53		
Texas	19		23	20	22	20	9	19	22
Texas Tech	14	11	10	14	13	14	6	14	20
West Virginia	15	20	20	7	15	18	8	15	17

== Rankings ==
Legend
Increase in ranking
Decrease in ranking
Not ranked previous week

		Pre	Wk 2	Wk 3	Wk 4	Wk 5	Wk 6	Wk 7	Wk 8	Wk 9	Wk 10	Wk 11	Wk 12	Wk 13	Wk 14	Wk 15	Wk 16	Wk 17	Final
Baylor	AP	2	2	2	2	2	2	2	2	2	2	2	2	2	2	3	2	3	
Baylor	C	1	–	2	2	2	2	2	2	2	2	2	2	2	2	3	2	3	1
Iowa State	AP																		
Iowa State	C		–																
Kansas	AP	6	7	5	5	3	3	6	6	9	15	23	RV	23	17	13	11	12	
Kansas	C	5	–	5	5	4	4	6	7	9	18	22	RV	24	19	14	12	11	16
Kansas State	AP																		
Kansas State	C		–																
Oklahoma	AP			RV				RV			24	9	12	9	7	16	25	RV	
Oklahoma	C		–	RV				RV			RV	14	12	10	8	15	24	RV	RV
Oklahoma State	AP			RV	RV	RV		RV	RV	RV	RV	RV	23	RV	RV	17	12	11	
Oklahoma State	C	RV	–	RV	RV	RV	RV	RV	RV	RV	RV	24	22	22	21	17	14	12	19
TCU	AP		RV																
TCU	C		–																
Texas	AP	19	18	14	11	10	8	4	4	5	5	6	13	12	14	15	13	9	
Texas	C	22	–	12	11	10	9	4	4	5	5	6	13	13	16	16	16	9	21
Texas Tech	AP	14	17	17	14	15	13	18	15	12	10	13	7	15	18	18	20	21	
Texas Tech	C	13	–	17	14	16	14	19	15	13	10	11	8	11	16	18	22	21	22
West Virginia	AP	15	11	11	8	7	9	14	13	14	11	17	14	13	10	6	10	13	
West Virginia	C	15	–	10	7	6	8	16	14	15	11	18	14	15	13	5	9	13	18

== Regular season ==
=== Conference matrix ===
	Baylor	Iowa State	Kansas	Kansas State	Oklahoma	Oklahoma State	TCU	Texas	Texas Tech	West Virginia
vs. Baylor	—	0–2	1–1	0–2	0–1	0–2	0–1	0–1	0–2	0–1
vs. Iowa State	2–0	–	2–0	2–0	2–0	2–0	2–0	2–0	2–0	2–0
vs. Kansas	1–1	0–2	—	0–2	1–1	1–1	0–2	2–0	0–2	1–1
vs. Kansas State	2–0	0–2	2–0	—	1–1	2–0	1–1	2–0	2–0	2–0
vs. Oklahoma	1–0	0–2	1–1	1–1	—	2–0	0–2	1–1	2–0	0–2
vs. Oklahoma State	2–0	0–2	1–1	0–2	0–2	–	2–0	1–1	0–2	1–1
vs. TCU	1–0	0–2	2–0	1–1	2–0	0–2	–	2–0	1–0	2–0
vs. Texas	1–0	0–2	0–2	0–2	1–1	1–1	0–2	—	2–0	1–1
vs. Texas Tech	2–0	0–2	2–0	0–2	0–2	2–0	0–1	0–2	—	2–0
vs. West Virginia	1–0	0–2	1–1	0–2	2–0	1–1	0–2	1–1	0–2	—
Total	13–1	0–18	12–6	4–14	9–8	11–7	5–11	11–6	9–8	11–6

=== Big 12/SEC Challenge ===
Date	Time	Big 12 team	SEC team	Location	TV	Attendance	Winner	Leader
Sat., Jan. 30	Noon	24 Oklahoma	9 Alabama	Lloyd Noble Center • Norman, OK	ESPN	2,680	Oklahoma (66–61)	Big 12 (1–0)
Sat., Jan. 30	Noon	Kansas State	Texas A&M	Bramlage Coliseum • Manhattan, KS	ESPNU	942	Texas A&M (68–61)	Tied (1–1)
Sat., Jan. 30	2:00 PM	11 West Virginia	Florida	WVU Coliseum • Morgantown, WV	ESPN	1,000	Florida (85–80)	SEC (2–1)
Sat., Jan. 30	2:00 PM	10 Texas Tech	LSU	Pete Maravich Assembly Center • Baton Rouge, LA	ESPN2	2,808	Texas Tech (76–71)	Tied (2–2)
Sat., Jan. 30	2:00 PM	TCU	12 Missouri	Mizzou Arena • Columbia, MO	ESPNU	3,063	Missouri (102–98) (OT)	SEC (3–2)
Sat., Jan. 30	4:00 PM	2 Baylor	Auburn	Ferrell Center • Waco, Texas	ESPN	2,350	Baylor (84–72)	Tied (3–3)
Sat., Jan. 30	4:00 PM	Oklahoma State	Arkansas	Gallagher-Iba Arena • Stillwater, OK	ESPN2	3,350	Oklahoma State (81–77)	Big 12 (4–3)
Sat., Jan. 30	6:00 PM	15 Kansas	18 Tennessee	Thompson–Boling Arena • Knoxville, TN	ESPN	4,191	Tennessee (81–60)	Tied (4–4)
Sat., Jan. 30	6:00 PM	Iowa State	Mississippi State	Humphrey Coliseum • Starkville, MS	ESPN2	1,000	Mississippi State (95–56)	SEC (5–4)
Sat., Jan. 30	Georgia, Ole Miss, South Carolina, and Vanderbilt will not participate for the SEC. The Texas-Kentucky game was canceled due to COVID-19. All times Eastern							

== Postseason ==
=== Big 12 tournament ===
First round Wednesday, March 10
8	TCU	50
9	Kansas State	71
7	Oklahoma	79
10	Iowa State	73

Quarterfinals; Thursday, March 11
1	Baylor	74
9	Kansas State	68
4	West Virginia	69
5	Oklahoma State	72
2	Kansas	69
7	Oklahoma	62
3	Texas	67
6	Texas Tech	66

Semifinals; Friday, March 12
1	Baylor	74
5	Oklahoma State	83
2	~~Kansas~~ (Note: Kansas withdrew from the Big 12 tournament after a player tested positive for COVID-19, which led to the game being cancelled, and Texas advancing in the tournament.)
3	Texas

Championship; Saturday, March 13
5	Oklahoma State	86
3	Texas	91

=== NCAA tournament ===
Seed	Region	School	First Round	Second Round	Sweet 16	Elite Eight	Final Four	Championship
1	South	Baylor	#16 Hartford W, 79–55	#9 Wisconsin W, 76–63	#5 Villanova W, 62–51	#3 Arkansas W, 81–72	#2 Houston W, 78–59	#1 Gonzaga W, 86–70
3	West	Kansas	#14 Eastern Washington W, 93–84	#6 USC L, 51–85				
3	East	Texas	#14 Abilene Christian L, 52–53					
3	Midwest	West Virginia	#14 Morehead State W, 84–67	#11 Syracuse L, 72–75				
4	Midwest	Oklahoma State	#13 Liberty 'W, 69–60	#12 Oregon State L, 70–80				
6	South	Texas Tech	#11 Utah State W, 65–53	#3 Arkansas L, 66–68				
8	West	Oklahoma	#9 Missouri W, 72–68	#1 Gonzaga L, 71–87				
	7 Bids	W-L (%):	6–1 .857	1–5 .167	1–0 1.000	1–0 1.000	1–0 1.000	TOTAL: 11–6 .647

== Honors and awards ==
=== All-Americans ===
Consensus All-Americans
First Team	Second Team	Third Team
Jared Butler, G, Baylor; Cade Cunningham, G, Oklahoma State		Davion Mitchell, G, Baylor

To earn "consensus" status, a player must win honors from a majority of the following teams: the Associated Press, the USBWA, Sporting News, and the National Association of Basketball Coaches.

=== All-Big 12 awards and teams ===
2021 Big 12 Men's Basketball Individual Awards
Award	Recipient(s)
Player of the Year	Cade Cunningham, G, Oklahoma State
Coach of the Year	Scott Drew, Baylor
Defensive Player of the Year	Davion Mitchell, G, Baylor
Sixth Man Award	Kai Jones, C, Texas
Newcomer of the Year	Mac McClung†, G, Texas Tech
Freshman of the Year	Cade Cunningham†, G, Oklahoma State

2021 Big 12 Men's Basketball All-Conference Teams
First Team	Second Team	Third Team	Defensive Team	Newcomer Team	Freshman Team
Jared Butler†, G, Baylor; Davion Mitchell, G, Baylor; Austin Reaves, G, Oklahoma; Cade Cunningham†, G, Oklahoma St. Derek Culver, F, West Virginia	Marcus Garrett, G, Kansas; David McCormack, F, Kansas; Andrew Jones, G, Texas; Mac McClung, G, Texas Tech; Miles McBride, G, West Virginia	MaCio Teague, G, Baylor; Rasir Bolton, G, Iowa State; RJ Nembhard, G, TCU; Matt Coleman III, G, Texas; Courtney Ramey, G, Texas; Terrence Shannon Jr., G, Texas	Jared Butler, G, Baylor; Davion Mitchell†, G, Baylor; Mark Vital†, F, Baylor; Marcus Garrett†, G, Kansas; Gabe Osabuohien, F, West Virginia	Jonathan Tchatchoua, F, Baylor; Jalen Wilson, F, Kansas; Greg Brown, F, Texas; Cade Cunningham†, G, Oklahoma St. Mac McClung†, G, Texas Tech	Jalen Wilson†, F, Kansas; Cade Cunningham†, G, Oklahoma St. Mike Miles, G, TCU; Greg Brown†, F, Texas; Jalen Bridges, F, West Virginia
† - denotes unanimous selection
