= 2020–21 Oklahoma Sooners men's basketball team =

American college basketball season

2020–21 Oklahoma Sooners men's basketball

NCAA tournament, second round
- Conference: Big 12 Conference
- Record: 16–11 (9–8 Big 12)
- Head coach: Lon Kruger (10th season)
- Assistant coaches: Jim Molinari; Carlin Hartman; Pooh Williamson
- Home arena: Lloyd Noble Center

2020–21 Big 12 men's basketball standings
	Conf.				Overall
Team	W		L	PCT	W		L	PCT
No. 1 Baylor	13	–	1	.929	28	–	2	.933
No. 16 Kansas	12	–	6	.667	21	–	9	.700
No. 21 Texas †	11	–	6	.647	19	–	8	.704
No. 18 West Virginia	11	–	6	.647	19	–	10	.655
No. 19 Oklahoma State	11	–	7	.611	21	–	9	.700
No. 22 Texas Tech	9	–	8	.529	18	–	11	.621
Oklahoma	9	–	8	.529	16	–	11	.593
TCU	5	–	11	.313	12	–	14	.462
Kansas State	4	–	14	.222	9	–	20	.310
Iowa State	0	–	18	.000	2	–	22	.083
† 2021 Big 12 Tournament winner Rankings from AP poll

The 2020–21 Oklahoma Sooners basketball team represented the University of Oklahoma in the 2020–21 NCAA Division I men's basketball season. They were led by 10th-year head coach Lon Kruger and played their home games at the Lloyd Noble Center in Norman, Oklahoma, as members of the Big 12 Conference. They finished the season 16–11, 9–8 in Big 12 play to finish in a tie for sixth place. As the No. 7 seed in the Big 12 tournament, they defeated Iowa State before losing to Kansas in the quarterfinals. They received an at-large bid to the NCAA tournament as the No. 8 seed in the West region. There they defeated Missouri in the First Round before losing to Gonzaga in the Second Round.

On March 25, 2021, head coach Lon Kruger retired as head coach after 10 years at Oklahoma and 45 years of coaching. On April 3, the school named Loyola coach Porter Moser the new head coach.

== Previous season ==
The Sooners finished the 2019–20 season with an overall record of 19–11, 9–9 in Big 12 play to finish in a tie for third place. All postseason tournaments were canceled due to the ongoing COVID-19 pandemic.

== Offseason ==
=== Departures ===
Name	Number	Pos.	Height	Weight	Year	Hometown	Reason for departure
Corbin Merritt	2	C	6'9"	245	RS Sophomore	Tallahassee, FL	Transferred to Austin Peay
Kristian Doolittle	21	F	6'7"	232	Senior	Edmond, OK	Graduated
Jamal Bieniemy	24	G	6'5"	187	Sophomore	Katy, TX	Transferred to UTEP

=== Incoming transfers ===
Name	Number	Pos.	Height	Weight	Year	Hometown	Previous School
Umoja Gibson	2	G	6'1"	176	Junior	Waco, TX	Transferred from North Texas.
Elijah Harkless	24	G	6'3"	195	Junior	Rialto, CA	Transferred from Cal State Northridge.

=== 2020 recruiting class ===
College recruiting
Name	Hometown	School	Height	Weight	Commit date
Trey Phipps; PG / SG	Tulsa, OK	Booker T. Washington	6 ft 1 in (1.85 m)	160 lb (73 kg)	Aug 1, 2019
Trey Phipps; PG / SG	Recruit ratings: Rivals: 247Sports: ESPN: (N/A)				
Josh O'Garro; SF	George Town, Cayman Islands	Santa Clarita Christian School	6 ft 5 in (1.96 m)	175 lb (79 kg)	Aug 6, 2020
Josh O'Garro; SF	Recruit ratings: Rivals: 247Sports: ESPN: (80)				
Overall recruit ranking:
Note: In many cases, Scout, Rivals, 247Sports, On3, and ESPN may conflict in their listings of height and weight.; In these cases, the average was taken. ESPN grades are on a 100-point scale.; Sources: "2020 Team Ranking". Rivals.

== Roster ==
2020–21 Oklahoma Sooners men's basketball team
Players
Coaches

Pos.	#	Name	Height	Weight	Year	Previous school	Hometown
F	0	Victor Iwuakor	6 ft 7 in (2.01 m)	223 lb (101 kg)	So	Sulphur Springs	Abuja, Nigeria
F	1	Jalen Hill	6 ft 7 in (2.01 m)	225 lb (102 kg)	So	Clark	Las Vegas, NV
G	2	Umoja Gibson	6 ft 1 in (1.85 m)	176 lb (80 kg)	Jr	North Texas	Waco, TX
G	3	Trey Phipps	6 ft 2 in (1.88 m)	178 lb (81 kg)	Fr	Booker T. Washington	Tulsa, OK
G	11	De'Vion Harmon	6 ft 2 in (1.88 m)	198 lb (90 kg)	So	John Guyer	Denton, TX
G	12	Austin Reaves	6 ft 5 in (1.96 m)	206 lb (93 kg)	RS Sr	Wichita State	Newark, AR
F	13	Anyang Garang	6 ft 9 in (2.06 m)	205 lb (93 kg)	RS Fr	NBA Global Academy	Adelaide, Australia
G	15	Alondes Williams	6 ft 5 in (1.96 m)	201 lb (91 kg)	Sr	Triton College	Milwaukee, WI
C	20	Rick Issanza	7 ft 1 in (2.16 m)	245 lb (111 kg)	RS Fr	Bella Vista Prep	Kinshasa, Congo
G	21	Josh O'Garro	6 ft 5 in (1.96 m)	175 lb (79 kg)	Fr	Santa Clarita Christian School	George Town, Cayman Islands
G	24	Elijah Harkless	6 ft 3 in (1.91 m)	195 lb (88 kg)	Jr	Cal State Northridge	San Bernardino, CA
F	32	Read Streller (W)	6 ft 8 in (2.03 m)	213 lb (97 kg)	Sr	Oklahoma Christian School	Edmond, OK
F	35	Brady Manek	6 ft 9 in (2.06 m)	231 lb (105 kg)	Sr	Harrah	Harrah, OK
G	44	Blake Seacat (W)	6 ft 4 in (1.93 m)	203 lb (92 kg)	So	Jenks	Jenks, OK
G	45	Keller Casey (W)	6 ft 6 in (1.98 m)	212 lb (96 kg)	So	Episcopal School of Dallas	Dallas, TX
F	52	Kur Kuath	6 ft 10 in (2.08 m)	220 lb (100 kg)	RS Sr	Salt Lake CC	Biemnon, South Sudan

Head coach

- Lon Kruger (Kansas State)

Assistant coach(es)

- Carlin Hartman (Tulane)
- Jim Molinari (Illinois Wesleyan)
- Pooh Williamson (Tulsa)

Legend

- (C) Team captain
- (S) Suspended
- (I) Ineligible
- (W) Walk-on
- Injured
- Current redshirt

Roster

== Schedule and results ==
Date time, TV	Rank^{#}	Opponent^{#}	Result	Record	Site (attendance) city, state
Regular season
December 3, 2020*; 7:00 pm, FSOK		UTSA	W 105–66	1–0	Lloyd Noble Center (2,201); Norman, OK
December 6, 2020; 3:00 pm, ESPN2		at TCU	W 82–78	2–0 (1–0)	Schollmaier Arena (1,747); Fort Worth, TX
December 9, 2020*; 7:00 pm, FS1		at Xavier; Big East/Big 12 Battle	L 77–99	2–1	Cintas Center (300); Cincinnati, OH
December 12, 2020*; 4:00 pm, FSOK		Florida A&M	W 85–54	3–1	Lloyd Noble Center (1,909); Norman, OK
December 16, 2020*; 7:00 pm, FSOK		Oral Roberts	W 79–65	4–1	Lloyd Noble Center (2,000); Norman, OK
December 19, 2020*; 4:00 pm, FSOK		Houston Baptist	W 84–65	5–1	Lloyd Noble Center (611); Norman, OK
December 22, 2020; 6:00 pm, ESPN2		No. 15 Texas Tech	L 67–69	5–2 (1–1)	Lloyd Noble Center (1,328); Norman, OK
January 2, 2021; 3:00 pm, ESPN2		No. 9 West Virginia	W 75–71	6–2 (2–1)	Lloyd Noble Center (2,431); Norman, OK
January 6, 2021; 8:00 pm, ESPN2		at No. 2 Baylor	L 61–76	6–3 (2–2)	Ferrell Center (2,350); Waco, TX
January 9, 2021; 3:30 pm, CBS		at No. 6 Kansas	L 59–63	6–4 (2–3)	Allen Fieldhouse (2,500); Lawrence, KS
January 12, 2021; 6:30 pm, ESPN+		TCU	W 82–46	7–4 (3–3)	Lloyd Noble Center (1,921); Norman, OK
January 16, 2021; 7:00 pm, ESPN2		at Oklahoma State; Bedlam	Postponed		Gallagher-Iba Arena; Stillwater, OK
January 19, 2021; 5:30 pm, FSOK		at Kansas State	W 76–50	8–4 (4–3)	Lloyd Noble Center (1,934); Norman, OK
January 23, 2021; 11:00 am, ESPN		No. 9 Kansas	W 75–68	9–4 (5–3)	Lloyd Noble Center (2,669); Norman, OK
January 26, 2021; 6:00 pm, ESPN2	No. 24	at No. 5 Texas	W 80–79	10–4 (6–3)	Frank Erwin Center (0); Austin, TX
January 30, 2021*; 11:00 am, ESPN	No. 24	No. 9 Alabama; Big 12/SEC Challenge	W 66–61	11–4	Lloyd Noble Center (2,680); Norman, OK
February 1, 2021; 8:00 pm, ESPN	No. 9	at No. 13 Texas Tech	L 52–57	11–5 (6–4)	United Supermarkets Arena (4,250); Lubbock, TX
February 6, 2021; 11:00 am, ESPN2	No. 9	Iowa State	W 79–72	12–5 (7–4)	Lloyd Noble Center (2,734); Norman, OK
February 10, 2021; 5:00 pm, ESPN2	No. 12	No. 2 Baylor	Postponed		Lloyd Noble Center; Norman, OK
February 13, 2021; 12:00 pm, ESPN+	No. 12	at No. 14 West Virginia	W 91–90 ^{2OT}	13–5 (8–4)	WVU Coliseum (2,800); Morgantown, WV
February 18, 2021; TBD	No. 9	No. 12 Texas	Postponed		Lloyd Noble Center; Norman, OK
February 20, 2021; 5:00 pm, ESPN2	No. 9	at Iowa State	W 66–56	14–5 (9–4)	Hilton Coliseum (1,281); Ames, IA
February 23, 2021; 8:00 pm, ESPN2	No. 7	at Kansas State	L 57–62	14–6 (9–5)	Bramlage Coliseum (896); Manhattan, KS
February 27, 2021; 2:00 pm, ABC	No. 7	Oklahoma State; Bedlam	L 90–94 ^{OT}	14–7 (9–6)	Lloyd Noble Center (2,929); Norman, OK
March 1, 2021; 8:00 pm, ESPN	No. 16	at No. 17 Oklahoma State; Bedlam	L 75–79	14–8 (9–7)	Gallagher-Iba Arena (3,350); Stillwater, OK
March 4, 2021; 8:00 pm, ESPN	No. 16	No. 15 Texas	L 65–69	14–9 (9–8)	Lloyd Noble Center (2,952); Norman, OK
Big 12 Tournament
March 10, 2021; 8:30 pm, ESPN	(7) No. 25	vs. (10) Iowa State; First Round	W 79–73	15–9	Sprint Center (0); Kansas City, MO
March 11, 2021; 5:30 pm, ESPN	(7) No. 25	vs. (2) No. 11 Kansas; Quarterfinals	L 62–69	15–10	Sprint Center (3,510); Kansas City, MO
NCAA tournament
March 20, 2021*; 6:25 pm, TNT	(8 W)	vs. (9 W) Missouri; First Round	W 72–68	16–10	Lucas Oil Stadium; Indianapolis, IN
March 22, 2021*; 1:40 pm, CBS	(8 W)	vs. (1 W) No. 1 Gonzaga; Second Round	L 71–87	16–11	Hinkle Fieldhouse; Indianapolis, IN
*Non-conference game. ^{#}Rankings from AP Poll. (#) Tournament seedings in parentheses. All times are in Central Time.
