= 2020–21 Kansas Jayhawks men's basketball team =

College basketball team

2020–21 Kansas Jayhawks men's basketball

NCAA tournament, Second Round
- Conference: Big 12 Conference

Ranking
- Coaches: No. 16
- AP: No. 12
- Record: 21–9 (12–6 Big 12)
- Head coach: Bill Self (18th season)
- Assistant coaches: Jerrance Howard (8th season); Norm Roberts (10th season); Kurtis Townsend (17th season)
- Home arena: Allen Fieldhouse

2020–21 Big 12 men's basketball standings
| | Conf. | | | | Overall |
| Team | W | | L | PCT | W | | L | PCT |
|---|---|---|---|---|---|---|---|---|
| No. 1 Baylor | 13 | – | 1 | .929 | 28 | – | 2 | .933 |
| No. 16 Kansas | 12 | – | 6 | .667 | 21 | – | 9 | .700 |
| No. 21 Texas † | 11 | – | 6 | .647 | 19 | – | 8 | .704 |
| No. 18 West Virginia | 11 | – | 6 | .647 | 19 | – | 10 | .655 |
| No. 19 Oklahoma State | 11 | – | 7 | .611 | 21 | – | 9 | .700 |
| No. 22 Texas Tech | 9 | – | 8 | .529 | 18 | – | 11 | .621 |
| Oklahoma | 9 | – | 8 | .529 | 16 | – | 11 | .593 |
| TCU | 5 | – | 11 | .313 | 12 | – | 14 | .462 |
| Kansas State | 4 | – | 14 | .222 | 9 | – | 20 | .310 |
| Iowa State | 0 | – | 18 | .000 | 2 | – | 22 | .083 |
† 2021 Big 12 Tournament winner Rankings from AP poll

The 2020–21 Kansas Jayhawks men's basketball team represented the University of Kansas in the 2020–21 NCAA Division I men's basketball season, which was the Jayhawks' 123rd basketball season. The Jayhawks, members of the Big 12 Conference, played their home games at Allen Fieldhouse in Lawrence, Kansas. They were led by 18th year Hall of Fame head coach Bill Self. The Jayhawks finished the regular season 20–8 overall and 2nd in the Big 12. They were selected to the 2021 NCAA tournament as a 3 seed. They would be eliminated in the second round.

== Season notes ==
On November 30, 2020, the Jayhawks were ranked in the AP poll for the 223rd consecutive week, breaking UCLA's record of 222 from 1966 to 1980. They had been ranked in every weekly AP poll since February 3, 2009. The Jayhawks went on an eight-game winning streak after losing their season opener. Following road losses to Oklahoma State, Baylor, and Oklahoma, the Jayhawks lost 3 straight games for the first time since the 2012–13 season and only the third time under Self. The streak is only the 9th losing streak of any length under Self. In total they lost five of seven games, which lead to them unranked being in the AP poll released on February 8, 2021, ending their ranked streak at 231. After going 3–0 in games that week, they would re-enter the rankings at 23 on February 15, 2021. The Jayhawks were swept by Texas, which was only the 2nd time under Self they were swept in the regular season. They finished 12–6 in Big 12 play, which gave them a 2nd-place finish in the conference. It is the 21st consecutive season the Jayhawks finished in the top three of the Big 12. Additionally, each year of the Big 12's 25 years of existence, Kansas has finished in the top five of the conference. They were selected to the NCAA tournament, their NCAA record extending 31st consecutive tournament, as a 3 seed. The Jayhawks would lose in the second round to USC 85–51, their worst defeat in the NCAA Tournament and their 3rd worst defeat overall in program history. The loss was also the Jayhawks lowest points scored in the NCAA Tournament since the shot clock was introduced in the 1985–86 season. The Jayhawks also ended their streak of 15 consecutive seasons with 25 or more wins, additionally, their 21 wins was the team's lowest win total since the 1988-89 season. However, both win totals were due in part to the Jayhawks playing fewer non-conference games than normal due to the COVID-19 pandemic.

== Roster changes ==
=== Graduation ===
Below are players from the previous season who ran out of college eligibility.

| Name | Position |
|---|---|
| Udoka Azubuike | C |
| Isaiah Moss | G |

=== Early draft entrants ===
| Name | Position | Class |
|---|---|---|
| Devon Dotson | Guard | Sophomore |

=== 2020 recruiting class ===
College recruiting information
| Name | Hometown | School | Height | Weight | Commit date |
|---|---|---|---|---|---|
| Tyon Grant-Foster; G | Kansas City, KS | Indian Hills CC | 6 ft 7 in (2.01 m) | 205 lb (93 kg) | Oct 14, 2019 |
| Tyon Grant-Foster; G | Recruit ratings: Rivals: 247Sports: ESPN: (N/A) | | | | |
| Gethro Muscadin; C | Gonaïves, Haiti | Aspire Academy (KY) | 6 ft 10 in (2.08 m) | 215 lb (98 kg) | Oct 17, 2019 |
| Gethro Muscadin; C | Recruit ratings: Rivals: 247Sports: ESPN: (80) | | | | |
| Bryce Thompson; SG | Tulsa, OK | Booker T. Washington | 6 ft 5 in (1.96 m) | 175 lb (79 kg) | Nov 12, 2019 |
| Bryce Thompson; SG | Recruit ratings: Rivals: 247Sports: ESPN: (90) | | | | |
| Latrell Josell; PG | Chicago, IL | Central | 6 ft 0 in (1.83 m) | 160 lb (73 kg) | Nov 14, 2019 |
| Latrell Josell; PG | Recruit ratings: Rivals: 247Sports: ESPN: (77) | | | | |
Overall recruiting rankings: 247 Sports: 23 Rivals: 12 ESPN: 20

=== Transfers ===
==== Incoming ====
| Name | Position | Class | Old School |
|---|---|---|---|
| Tyon Grant-Foster | G | JR | Indian Hills CC |

==== Outgoing ====
| Name | Position | Class | New School |
|---|---|---|---|
| Elijah Elliott | G | RS-SO | Stephen F. Austin |

=== COVID-19 Opt-outs ===
| Name | Position | Class |
|---|---|---|
| Silvio De Sousa | F | Sr |

== Roster ==
2020–21 Kansas Jayhawks men's basketball team
Players
Coaches

| Pos. | # | Name | Height | Weight | Year | Hometown |
|---|---|---|---|---|---|---|
| G | 0 | Marcus Garrett | 6 ft 5 in (1.96 m) | 205 lb (93 kg) | Sr | Dallas, TX |
| G | 1 | Tyon Grant-Foster | 6 ft 7 in (2.01 m) | 205 lb (93 kg) | Jr | Kansas City, KS |
| G | 2 | Christian Braun | 6 ft 6 in (1.98 m) | 210 lb (95 kg) | So | Burlington, KS |
| G | 3 | Dajuan Harris Jr. | 6 ft 1 in (1.85 m) | 170 lb (77 kg) | RS Fr | Columbia, MO |
| G | 4 | Latrell Jossel (injured) | 5 ft 11 in (1.8 m) | 160 lb (73 kg) | Fr | Chicago, IL |
| F | 10 | Jalen Wilson | 6 ft 8 in (2.03 m) | 220 lb (100 kg) | RS Fr | Denton, TX |
| G | 12 | Chris Teahan (W) | 6 ft 4 in (1.93 m) | 195 lb (88 kg) | Sr | Leawood, KS |
| G/F | 13 | Tristan Enaruna (COVID) | 6 ft 8 in (2.03 m) | 215 lb (98 kg) | So | Almere, Netherlands |
| G | 20 | Michael Jankovich (W) | 6 ft 5 in (1.96 m) | 190 lb (86 kg) | So | Dallas, TX |
| G | 24 | Bryce Thompson | 6 ft 5 in (1.96 m) | 195 lb (88 kg) | Fr | Tulsa, OK |
| G | 30 | Ochai Agbaji | 6 ft 5 in (1.96 m) | 215 lb (98 kg) | Jr | Kansas City, MO |
| C | 33 | David McCormack | 6 ft 10 in (2.08 m) | 250 lb (113 kg) | Jr | Norfolk, VA |
| C | 35 | Gethro Muscadin | 6 ft 10 in (2.08 m) | 220 lb (100 kg) | Fr | Gonaïves, Haiti |
| F | 44 | Mitch Lightfoot | 6 ft 8 in (2.03 m) | 225 lb (102 kg) | RS Sr | Gilbert, AZ |

Head coach

- Bill Self (Oklahoma State)

Assistant coach(es)

- Norm Roberts (Queens (NY))
- Kurtis Townsend (Western Kentucky)
- Jerrance Howard (Illinois)

Legend

- (C) Team captain
- (S) Suspended
- (I) Ineligible
- (W) Walk-on
- Injured
- Current redshirt

Roster
Last update: March 22, 2021

== Schedule and results ==
=== COVID-19 impact ===
Due to COVID-19, KU's annual Late Night in the Phog, the Jayhawks name for their Midnight Madness event, was done virtually. On October 13, Kansas and Missouri announced their scheduled renewal of their rivalry would be postponed a year and will begin play in 2021. On October 26, the University of Kansas announced that about 1,500 fans would be allowed, about 10% capacity. Despite the announcement saying that 1,500 fans would be allowed, the school has consistently reported attendance numbers of 2,500 for home games.

In total, nine games and the Wooden Classic, which the Jayhawks were scheduled to play in, were cancelled, and one game was postponed.

The Jayhawks finished the regular season without any known positive COVID-19 tests from players, coaches, or support staff. They would, however, have an unnamed player test positive prior to the semifinals of the Big 12 tournament. When Bill Self announced the positive test, he also confirmed that two other players had tested positive making a total of three positive tests. While it was not confirmed that they had tested positive, earlier that week Tristin Enaruna and David McCormack and been put in the COVID protocol after being exposed to it.

=== Schedule ===
All games listed below had limited or no attendance due to the pandemic.

| Date time, TV | Rank^{#} | Opponent^{#} | Result | Record | High points | High rebounds | High assists | Site (attendance) city, state |
Regular Season
| November 26, 2020*; 12:30 pm, FOX | No. 6 | vs. No. 1 Gonzaga; Quicken Loans Fort Myers Tip-Off | L 90–102 | 0–1 | 22 – Garrett | 6 – McCormack | 4 – Agbaji | Suncoast Credit Union Arena (175); Fort Myers, FL |
| November 27, 2020*; 1:00 pm, FS1 | No. 6 | vs. Saint Joseph's; Quicken Loans Fort Myers Tip-Off | W 94–72 | 1–1 | 30 – Braun | 9 – Braun | 5 – Harris | Suncoast Credit Union Arena (310); Fort Myers, FL |
| December 1, 2020*; 8:30 pm, ESPN | No. 7 | vs. No. 20 Kentucky; Champions Classic | W 65–62 | 2–1 | 23 – Wilson | 12 – Braun | 5 – Harris | Bankers Life Fieldhouse (0); Indianapolis, IN |
| December 3, 2020*; 7:00 pm, ESPN+ | No. 7 | Washburn | W 89–54 | 3–1 | 17 – McCormack | 6 – Tied | 5 – Garrett | Allen Fieldhouse (0); Lawrence, KS |
| December 5, 2020*; 3:00 pm, ESPN+ | No. 7 | North Dakota State | W 65–61 | 4–1 | 14 – Wilson | 14 – Wilson | 4 – Garrett | Allen Fieldhouse (0); Lawrence, KS |
| December 8, 2020*; 4:00 pm, ESPN | No. 5 | No. 8 Creighton; Big East–Big 12 Alliance | W 73–72 | 5–1 | 23 – Wilson | 10 – Wilson | 6 – Braun | Allen Fieldhouse (2,500); Lawrence, KS |
| December 11, 2020*; 6:00 pm, ESPN2 | No. 5 | Omaha | W 95–50 | 6–1 | 18 – Agbaji | 11 – McCormack | 8 – Garrett | Allen Fieldhouse (2,500); Lawrence, KS |
| December 13, 2020*; 1:00 pm, ESPN+ | No. 5 | Tarleton State | Cancelled due to a Tarleton State player testing positive for COVID-19 | | | | | Allen Fieldhouse; Lawrence, KS |
| December 17, 2020; 6:00 pm, ESPN | No. 5 | at No. 14 Texas Tech | W 58–57 | 7–1 (1–0) | 23 – Agbaji | 10 – Tied | 4 – Garrett | United Supermarkets Arena (4,250); Lubbock, TX |
| December 22, 2020; 8:00 pm, ESPN2 | No. 3 | No. 7 West Virginia | W 79–65 | 8–1 (2–0) | 22 – Braun | 10 – McCormack | 7 – Braun | Allen Fieldhouse (2,500); Lawrence, KS |
| January 2, 2021; 11:00 a.m., ESPN2 | No. 3 | No. 8 Texas | L 59–84 | 8–2 (2–1) | 10 – Wilson | 7 – Wilson | 6 – Braun | Allen Fieldhouse (2,500); Lawrence, KS |
| January 5, 2021; 9:00 p.m., ESPN | No. 6 | at TCU | W 93–64 | 9–2 (3–1) | 20 – McCormack | 8 – Tied | 7 – Harris | Schollmaier Arena (1,894); Fort Worth, TX |
| January 9, 2021; 3:30 p.m., CBS | No. 6 | Oklahoma | W 63–59 | 10–2 (4–1) | 15 – McCormack | 11 – Wilson | 4 – Garrett | Allen Fieldhouse (2,500); Lawrence, KS |
| January 12, 2021; 7:00 p.m., ESPN+ | No. 6 | at Oklahoma State | L 70–75 | 10–3 (4–2) | 24 – McCormack | 12 – McCormack | 3 – Wilson | Gallagher-Iba Arena (3,350); Stillwater, OK |
| January 16, 2021; 1:00 p.m., ESPN+ | No. 6 | Iowa State | Postponed to February 11 due to COVID-19 issues at Iowa State | | | | | Allen Fieldhouse; Lawrence, KS |
| January 18, 2021; 8:00 p.m., ESPN | No. 9 | at No. 2 Baylor | L 69–77 | 10–4 (4–3) | 17 – Braun | 5 – Wilson | 8 – Garrett | Ferrell Center (2,350); Waco, TX |
| January 23, 2021; 11:00 a.m., ESPN | No. 9 | at Oklahoma | L 68–75 | 10–5 (4–4) | 21 – Garrett | 12 – Garrett | 4 – Tied | Lloyd Noble Center (2,350); Norman, OK |
| January 28, 2021; 7:00 p.m., ESPN+ | No. 15 | TCU | W 59–51 | 11–5 (5–4) | 15 – McCormack | 7 – Garrett | 4 – Agbaji | Allen Fieldhouse (2,500); Lawrence, KS |
| January 30, 2021*; 6:00 p.m., ESPN | No. 15 | at No. 18 Tennessee; Big 12/SEC Challenge | L 61–80 | 11–6 | 17 – McCormack | 9 – Wilson | 5 – Wilson | Thompson–Boling Arena (4,191); Knoxville, TN |
| February 2, 2021; 7:00 p.m., ESPN+ | No. 23 | Kansas State; Sunflower Showdown | W 74–51 | 12–6 (6–4) | 18 – Tied | 10 – McCormack | 5 – Tied | Allen Fieldhouse (2,500); Lawrence, KS |
| February 6, 2021; 1:00 p.m., CBS | No. 23 | at No. 17 West Virginia | L 79–91 | 12–7 (6–5) | 18 – Garrett | 14 – Wilson | 4 – Wilson | WVU Coliseum (1,500); Morgantown, WV |
| February 8, 2021; 8:00 p.m., ESPN | | No. 23 Oklahoma State | W 78–66 | 13–7 (7–5) | 23 – McCormack | 11 – Wilson | 4 – Garrett | Allen Fieldhouse (2,500); Lawrence, KS |
| February 11, 2021; 6:00 p.m., ESPN | | Iowa State | W 97–64 | 14–7 (8–5) | 19 – Agbaji | 11 – Wilson | 6 – Braun | Allen Fieldhouse (2,500); Lawrence, KS |
| February 13, 2021; 2:00 p.m., ABC | | at Iowa State | W 64–50 | 15–7 (9–5) | 22 – Wilson | 10 – Wilson | 5 – Garrett | Hilton Coliseum (1,320); Ames, IA |
| February 17, 2021; 7:00 p.m., ESPN+ | No. 23 | at Kansas State; Sunflower Showdown | W 59–41 | 16–7 (10–5) | 14 – Garrett | 9 – Wilson | 2 – Tied | Bramlage Coliseum (1,248); Manhattan, KS |
| February 20, 2021; 1:00 p.m., ESPN | No. 23 | No. 15 Texas Tech | W 67–61 | 17–7 (11–5) | 17 – McCormack | 11 – Wilson | 5 – Garrett | Allen Fieldhouse (2,500); Lawrence, KS |
| February 23, 2021; 8:00 p.m., ESPN | No. 17 | at No. 14 Texas | L 72–75 ^{OT} | 17–8 (11–6) | 17 – Agbaji | 12 – Wilson | 3 – Tied | Frank Erwin Center (2,482); Austin, TX |
| February 27, 2021; 7:00 p.m., ESPN | No. 17 | No. 2 Baylor | W 71–58 | 18–8 (12–6) | 20 – McCormack | 13 – Wilson | 4 – Agbaji | Allen Fieldhouse (2,600); Lawrence, KS |
| March 4, 2021*; 7:00 p.m., ESPN+ | No. 13 | UTEP | W 67–62 | 19–8 | 19 – Agbaji | 10 – McCormack | 5 – Garrett | Allen Fieldhouse (2,600); Lawrence, KS |
Big 12 Tournament
| March 11, 2021; 5:30 pm, ESPN | (2) No. 11 | vs. (7) No. 25 Oklahoma; Quarterfinals | W 69–62 | 20–8 | 26 – Agbaji | 9 – Wilson | 4 – Garrett | T-Mobile Center (3,510); Kansas City, MO |
| March 12, 2021; 8:30 pm, ESPN2 | (2) No. 11 | vs. (3) No. 13 Texas; Semifinals | Cancelled because Kansas withdrew from tournament due to a player who tested positive for COVID-19 | | | | | T-Mobile Center; Kansas City, MO |
NCAA tournament
| March 20, 2021*; 12:15 pm, TBS | (3 W) No. 12 | vs. (14 W) Eastern Washington; First Round | W 93–84 | 21–8 | 23 – Garrett | 9 – McCormack | 4 – Harris | Indiana Farmers Coliseum (961); Indianapolis, IN |
| March 22, 2021*; 8:40 pm, CBS | (3 W) No. 12 | vs. (6 W) No. 23 USC; Second Round | L 51–85 | 21–9 | 15 – Garrett | 6 – Garrett | 4 – Tied | Hinkle Fieldhouse (1,927); Indianapolis, IN |
*Non-conference game. ^{#}Rankings from AP Poll. (#) Tournament seedings in parentheses. W=West. All times are in Central Time.

†Attendance not announced

== Rankings ==
Ranking movements Legend: ██ Increase in ranking ██ Decrease in ranking RV = Received votes
| | Week | | | | | | | | | | | | | | | | | |
| Poll | Pre | 1 | 2 | 3 | 4 | 5 | 6 | 7 | 8 | 9 | 10 | 11 | 12 | 13 | 14 | 15 | 16 | Final |
|---|---|---|---|---|---|---|---|---|---|---|---|---|---|---|---|---|---|---|
| AP | 6 | 7 | 5 | 5 | 3 | 3 | 6 | 6 | 9 | 15 | 23 | RV | 23 | 17 | 13 | 11 | 12 | Not released |
| Coaches | 5 | 5* | 5 | 5 | 4 | 4 | 6 | 7 | 9 | 18 | 22 | RV | 24 | 19 | 14 | 12 | 11 | 16 |

*No rankings released
