= 2020–21 Kansas State Wildcats men's basketball team =

American college basketball season

2020–21 Kansas State Wildcats men's basketball
- Conference: Big 12 Conference
- Record: 9–20 (4–14 Big 12)
- Head coach: Bruce Weber (9th season)
- Assistant coaches: Chris Lowery (9th season); Jermaine Henderson (2nd season); Shane Southwell (1st season)
- Home arena: Bramlage Coliseum (12,528)

2020–21 Big 12 men's basketball standings
	Conf.				Overall
Team	W		L	PCT	W		L	PCT
No. 1 Baylor	13	–	1	.929	28	–	2	.933
No. 16 Kansas	12	–	6	.667	21	–	9	.700
No. 21 Texas †	11	–	6	.647	19	–	8	.704
No. 18 West Virginia	11	–	6	.647	19	–	10	.655
No. 19 Oklahoma State	11	–	7	.611	21	–	9	.700
No. 22 Texas Tech	9	–	8	.529	18	–	11	.621
Oklahoma	9	–	8	.529	16	–	11	.593
TCU	5	–	11	.313	12	–	14	.462
Kansas State	4	–	14	.222	9	–	20	.310
Iowa State	0	–	18	.000	2	–	22	.083
† 2021 Big 12 Tournament winner Rankings from AP poll

The 2020–21 Kansas State Wildcats men's basketball team represented Kansas State University in the 2020–21 NCAA Division I men's basketball season, their 118th basketball season. Their head coach is Bruce Weber in his ninth year at the helm of the Wildcats. The team played their home games in Bramlage Coliseum in Manhattan, Kansas as members of the Big 12 Conference. They finished the season 9-20, 4-14 in Big 12 Play to finish in 9th place. They defeated TCU in the first round of the Big 12 tournament before losing in the quarterfinals to Baylor.

== Roster ==
2020–21 Kansas State Wildcats men's basketball team
Players
Coaches

Pos.	#	Name	Height	Weight	Year	Previous school	Hometown
G	00	Mike McGuirl	6 ft 2 in (1.88 m)	195 lb (88 kg)	Sr	East Catholic High School	Ellington, Connecticut
F	1	Kaosi Ezeagu	6 ft 10 in (2.08 m)	255 lb (116 kg)	RS So	UTEP	Brampton, Ontario
G	2	Selton Miguel	6 ft 4 in (1.93 m)	210 lb (95 kg)	Fr	West Oaks Academy	Luanda, Angola
G	3	DaJuan Gordon	6 ft 4 in (1.93 m)	190 lb (86 kg)	So	Curie High School	Chicago, Illinois
F	4	Seryee Lewis	6 ft 9 in (2.06 m)	230 lb (104 kg)	Fr	Compass Prep	Chicago, Illinois
G	5	Rudi Williams	6 ft 3 in (1.91 m)	182 lb (83 kg)	Jr	Northeastern Oklahoma A&M	Hamilton, Ontario
F	11	Antonio Gordon	6 ft 9 in (2.06 m)	215 lb (98 kg)	So	Eisenhower High School	Lawton, Oklahoma
F	12	Carlton Linguard, Jr.	6 ft 11 in (2.11 m)	215 lb (98 kg)	So	Temple College	San Antonio, Texas
G	14	Drew Honas	6 ft 0 in (1.83 m)	170 lb (77 kg)	Jr	Pratt Community College	Medicine Lodge, Kansas
F	21	Davion Bradford	7 ft 0 in (2.13 m)	265 lb (120 kg)	Fr	Mehlville High School	St. Louis, Missouri
G	22	Luke Kasubke	6 ft 5 in (1.96 m)	190 lb (86 kg)	Fr	Chaminade College Prep	St. Louis, Missouri
F	23	Montavious Murphy	6 ft 9 in (2.06 m)	230 lb (104 kg)	So	Concordia Lutheran High School	Spring, Texas
G	24	Nijel Pack	6 ft 0 in (1.83 m)	180 lb (82 kg)	Fr	Lawrence Central High School	Indianapolis, Indiana
F	35	Joe Petrakis	6 ft 9 in (2.06 m)	220 lb (100 kg)	RS So	Dodge City Community College	Wichita, Kansas

Head coach

- Bruce Weber (Milwaukee)

Assistant coach(es)

- Chris Lowery (Southern Illinois)
- Jermaine Henderson (Miami (OH))
- Shane Southwell (Kansas State)

Legend

- (C) Team captain
- (S) Suspended
- (I) Ineligible
- (W) Walk-on
- Injured
- Current redshirt

Roster
Last update: March 25, 2021

== Schedule and results ==
Date time, TV	Rank^{#}	Opponent^{#}	Result	Record	High points	High rebounds	High assists	Site (attendance) city, state
Regular Season
November 25, 2020*; 1:00 pm, ESPNU		Drake; Little Apple Classic	L 70–80	0–1	22 – McGuirl	7 – A. Gordon	5 – Pack	Bramlage Coliseum (0); Manhattan, KS
November 27, 2020*; 7:30 pm, ESPNU		Colorado; Little Apple Classic	L 58–76	0–2	12 – Pack	7 – D. Gordon	5 – McGuirl	Bramlage Coliseum (0); Manhattan, KS
November 30, 2020*; 7:00 pm, ESPNU		Kansas City	W 62–58	1–2	14 – D. Gordon	9 – D. Gordon	3 – Pack	Bramlage Coliseum (0); Manhattan, KS
December 5, 2020*; 7:00 pm, ESPN+		UNLV	L 58–68	1–3	17 – McGuirl	9 – A. Gordon	7 – Pack	Bramlage Coliseum (0); Manhattan, KS
December 8, 2020*; 7:00 pm, ESPN+		Milwaukee	Postponed due to COVID-19 at Milwaukee; Rescheduled for December 11					Bramlage Coliseum; Manhattan, KS
December 8, 2020*; 7:00 pm, ESPN+		Fort Hays State	L 68–81	1–4	22 – McGuirl	6 – D. Gordon	5 – Pack	Bramlage Coliseum (519); Manhattan, KS
December 11, 2020*; 2:00 pm, FS1		at Butler; Big 12/Big East Battle	Cancelled due to COVID-19 at Butler					Hinkle Fieldhouse; Indianapolis, IN
December 11, 2020*; 7:00 pm, ESPN+		Milwaukee	W 76–75	2–4	18 – Bradford	7 – Bradford	8 – McGuirl	Bramlage Coliseum (577); Manhattan, KS
December 15, 2020; 8:00 pm, ESPNU		at Iowa State	W 74–65	3–4 (1–0)	15 – D. Gordon	11 – D. Gordon	3 – McGuirl	Hilton Coliseum (1,337); Ames, IA
December 19, 2020; 3:00 pm, ESPN+		No. 2 Baylor	L 69–100	3–5 (1–1)	23 – A. Gordon	6 – Tied	5 – Pack	Bramlage Coliseum (848); Manhattan, KS
December 21, 2020*; 1:00 pm, ESPN+		Jacksonville	W 70–46	4–5	16 – Pack	12 – D. Gordon	7 – McGuirl	Bramlage Coliseum (504); Manhattan, KS
December 29, 2020*; 7:00 pm, ESPN+		Omaha	W 60–58	5–5	13 – McGuirl	10 – Bradford	6 – McGuirl	Bramlage Coliseum (519); Manhattan, KS
January 2, 2021; 1:00 pm, ESPNU		TCU	L 60–67	5–6 (1–2)	18 – D. Gordon	9 – Bradford	6 – McGuirl	Bramlage Coliseum (798); Manhattan, KS
January 5, 2021; 6:00 pm, ESPNU		at No. 18 Texas Tech	L 71–82	5–7 (1–3)	22 – Miguel	8 – McGuirl	6 – Miguel	United Supermarkets Arena (3,523); Lubbock, TX
January 9, 2021; 5:00 pm, ESPN2		Oklahoma State	L 54-70	5–8 (1–4)	15 – McGuirl	11 – D. Gordon	7 – Miguel	Bramlage Coliseum (965); Manhattan, KS
January 13, 2021; 6:00 pm, ESPNU		Iowa State	Postponed due to COVID-19 at K-State					Bramlage Coliseum; Manhattan, KS
January 16, 2021; 7:00 pm, LHN		at No. 4 Texas	L 67–82	5–9 (1–5)	14 – Bradford	7 – Bradford	4 – McGuirl	Frank Erwin Center (0); Austin, TX
January 19, 2021; 5:30 pm, FSOK		at Oklahoma	L 50–76	5–10 (1–6)	13 – D. Gordon	11 – A. Gordon	2 – Tied	Lloyd Noble Center (1,934); Norman, OK
January 23, 2021; 3:00 pm, ESPN2		No. 14 West Virginia	L 47–69	5–11 (1–7)	15 – McGuirl	5 – Tied	3 – Tied	Bramlage Coliseum (931); Manhattan, KS
January 27, 2021; 8:00 pm, ESPN2		at No. 2 Baylor	L 59-107	5–12 (1–8)	11 – Pack	5 – Tied	5 – Pack	Ferrell Center (2,350); Waco, TX
January 30, 2021*; 11:00 a.m., ESPNU		Texas A&M; Big 12/SEC Challenge	L 61-68	5–13	26 – Pack	7 – Bradford	6 – McGuirl	Bramlage Coliseum (942); Manhattan, KS
February 2, 2021; 7:00 pm, ESPN+		at No. 23 Kansas; Sunflower Showdown	L 51–74	5–14 (1–9)	10 – Tied	8 – A. Gordon	3 – Pack	Allen Fieldhouse (2,500); Lawrence, KS
February 6, 2021; 3:00 pm, ESPN+		No. 13 Texas Tech	L 62–73	5–15 (1–10)	16 – Tied	9 – A. Gordon	5 – McGuirl	Bramlage Coliseum (1,000); Manhattan, KS
February 9, 2021; 7:00 pm, ESPN+		No. 13 Texas	L 77–80	5–16 (1–11)	22 – Pack	9 – A. Gordon	5 – Miguel	Bramlage Coliseum (752); Manhattan, KS
February 13, 2021; 11:00 am, ESPNU		at No. 23 Oklahoma State	L 60–67	5–17 (1–12)	15 – A. Gordon	14 – A. Gordon	3 – Tied	Gallagher-Iba Arena (3,350); Stillwater, OK
February 17, 2021; 7:00 pm, ESPN+		No. 23 Kansas; Sunflower Showdown	L 41–59	5–18 (1–13)	12 – D. Gordon	7 – Tied	5 – Pack	Bramlage Coliseum (1,248); Manhattan, KS
February 20, 2021; 4:00 pm, ESPN+		at TCU	W 62–54	6–18 (2–13)	16 – McGuirl	9 – McGuirl	5 – Tied	Schollmaier Arena (2,145); Fort Worth, TX
February 23, 2021; 8:00 pm, ESPN2		No. 7 Oklahoma	W 62–57	7–18 (3–13)	19 – McGuirl	10 – D. Gordon	9 – Pack	Bramlage Coliseum (896); Manhattan, KS
February 27, 2021; 3:00 pm, ESPN2		at No. 10 West Virginia	L 43–65	7–19 (3–14)	11 – Bradford	7 – A. Gordon	4 – McGuirl	WVU Coliseum (2,800); Morgantown, WV
March 6, 2021; 4:00 pm, ESPN+		Iowa State	W 61–56	8–19 (4–14)	17 – McGuirl	5 – Tied	7 – Miguel	Bramlage Coliseum (899); Manhattan, KS
Big 12 tournament
March 10, 2021; 5:30 pm, ESPN	(9)	vs. (8) TCU; First round	W 71–50	9–19	23 – Pack	8 – Ezeagu	5 – Pack	T-Mobile Center (0); Kansas City, MO
March 11, 2021; 1:30 pm, ESPN	(9)	vs. (1) No. 2 Baylor; Quarterfinals	L 68–74	9–20	18 – Tied	6 – Williams	7 – McGuirl	T-Mobile Center (3,491); Kansas City, MO
*Non-conference game. ^{#}Rankings from AP Poll. (#) Tournament seedings in parentheses. All times are in Central Time.

== Rankings ==
Ranking movements Legend: — = Not ranked
	Week																	
Poll	Pre	1	2	3	4	5	6	7	8	9	10	11	12	13	14	15	16	Final
AP	—	—	—	—	—	—	—	—	—	—	—	—	—	—	—	—	—	Not released
Coaches	—	—	—	—	—	—	—	—	—	—	—	—	—	—	—	—	—	—

*AP does not release post-NCAA tournament rankings
^Neither poll released a Week 1 ranking list.
