= 2020–21 Iowa State Cyclones men's basketball team =

American college basketball season

2020–21 Iowa State Cyclones men's basketball
- Conference: Big 12 Conference
- Record: 2–22 (0–18 Big 12)
- Head coach: Steve Prohm (6th season)
- Home arena: Hilton Coliseum

2020–21 Big 12 men's basketball standings
| | Conf. | | | | Overall |
| Team | W | | L | PCT | W | | L | PCT |
|---|---|---|---|---|---|---|---|---|
| No. 1 Baylor | 13 | – | 1 | .929 | 28 | – | 2 | .933 |
| No. 16 Kansas | 12 | – | 6 | .667 | 21 | – | 9 | .700 |
| No. 21 Texas † | 11 | – | 6 | .647 | 19 | – | 8 | .704 |
| No. 18 West Virginia | 11 | – | 6 | .647 | 19 | – | 10 | .655 |
| No. 19 Oklahoma State | 11 | – | 7 | .611 | 21 | – | 9 | .700 |
| No. 22 Texas Tech | 9 | – | 8 | .529 | 18 | – | 11 | .621 |
| Oklahoma | 9 | – | 8 | .529 | 16 | – | 11 | .593 |
| TCU | 5 | – | 11 | .313 | 12 | – | 14 | .462 |
| Kansas State | 4 | – | 14 | .222 | 9 | – | 20 | .310 |
| Iowa State | 0 | – | 18 | .000 | 2 | – | 22 | .083 |
† 2021 Big 12 Tournament winner Rankings from AP poll

The 2020–21 Iowa State Cyclones men's basketball team represented Iowa State University during the 2020–21 NCAA Division I men's basketball season. The Cyclones were led by Steve Prohm, who coached his sixth and final season at Iowa State. They played their home games at Hilton Coliseum in Ames, Iowa as members of the Big 12 Conference.

The Cyclones would suffer through a COVID-19-plagued 2–22 record, including an 0–18 mark in Big 12 play, the first team to go winless through the Big 12 since TCU in 2014. They lost in the First round of the Big 12 tournament to Oklahoma. Following the end of the season, ISU athletic director Jamie Pollard announced that the school and Prohm had parted ways.

== Previous season ==
The Cyclones finished the 2019–20 season 12–20, 5–13 in Big 12 play to finish in ninth place. They lost to Oklahoma State in the first round of the Big 12 Conference tournament. They were one of the few major conference teams in the country to complete a full season before play was halted nationally due to the COVID-19 pandemic.

== Offseason ==
=== Departures ===
Offseason departures
| Name | Position | Reason for departure |
|---|---|---|
| Zion Griffin | Forward | Transferred to UIC |
| Caleb Grill | Guard | Transferred to UNLV |
| Prentiss Nixon | Guard | Graduated |
| Michael Jacobson | Forward | Graduated |
| Tyrese Haliburton | Guard | Declared for the 2020 NBA draft; selected 12th overall by the Sacramento Kings |
| Terrence Lewis | Guard | Transferred to South Alabama |

=== Incoming transfers ===
Incoming transfers
| Name | Position | Hometown | Previous school | Remaining eligibility | Notes |
|---|---|---|---|---|---|
| Tyler Harris | Guard | Memphis, Tennessee | Memphis | 2 | Harris was granted a waiver for immediate NCAA eligibility. |
| Jalen Coleman-Lands | Guard | Indianapolis | DePaul/Illinois | 1 | Coleman-Lands was immediately eligible as a graduate transfer. |
| Blake Hinson | Forward | Deltona, Florida | Ole Miss | 2 | Hinson had to sit out the 2020–21 season due to a medical condition. |

=== 2020 recruiting class ===
College recruiting
| Name | Hometown | School | Height | Weight | Commit date |
|---|---|---|---|---|---|
| Xavier Foster; C #10 | Oskaloosa, Iowa | Oskaloosa | 7 ft 0 in (2.13 m) | 225 lb (102 kg) | Nov 11, 2019 |
| Xavier Foster; C #10 | Recruit ratings: Rivals: 247Sports: ESPN: (84) | | | | |
| Darlinstone Dubar; G #55 | Charlotte, North Carolina | Scotland Performance Institute | 6 ft 5 in (1.96 m) | 180 lb (82 kg) | Nov 5, 2019 |
| Darlinstone Dubar; G #55 | Recruit ratings: Rivals: 247Sports: ESPN: (78) | | | | |
| Dudley Blackwell; F #11 | Miami | Blanche Ely High School | 6 ft 6 in (1.98 m) | 190 lb (86 kg) | Oct 11, 2019 |
| Dudley Blackwell; F #11 | Recruit ratings: Rivals: 247Sports: ESPN: (81) | | | | |
| Jaden Walker; G #21 | Lawrenceville, GA | Discovery High School | 6 ft 5 in (1.96 m) | 175 lb (79 kg) | Sep 16, 2019 |
| Jaden Walker; G #21 | Recruit ratings: Rivals: 247Sports: ESPN: (80) | | | | |
Overall recruit ranking: Rivals: 36 247Sports: 26 ESPN: 18
Note: In many cases, Scout, Rivals, 247Sports, On3, and ESPN may conflict in their listings of height and weight.; In these cases, the average was taken. ESPN grades are on a 100-point scale.; Sources: "Iowa State 2020 Basketball Commitments". Rivals.; "ESPN". ESPN.; "2020 Team Ranking". Rivals.

=== 2021 recruiting class ===
College recruiting (2021)
| Name | Hometown | School | Height | Weight | Commit date |
|---|---|---|---|---|---|
| Tyrese Hunter; PG | Racine, Wisconsin | St. Catherine's HS (WI) | 6 ft 1 in (1.85 m) | 175 lb (79 kg) | Aug 4, 2020 |
| Tyrese Hunter; PG | Recruit ratings: Rivals: 247Sports: ESPN: (87) | | | | |
Overall recruit ranking: Rivals: 66 247Sports: 79
Note: In many cases, Scout, Rivals, 247Sports, On3, and ESPN may conflict in their listings of height and weight.; In these cases, the average was taken. ESPN grades are on a 100-point scale.; Sources: "Iowa State 2021 Basketball Commitments". Rivals.; "2021 Iowa State Cyclones Recruiting Class". ESPN.; "2021 Team Ranking". Rivals.

== Roster ==
2020–21 Iowa State Cyclones men's basketball team
Players
Coaches

| Pos. | # | Name | Height | Weight | Year | Previous school | Hometown |
|---|---|---|---|---|---|---|---|
| G/F | 0 | Blake Hinson (redshirt) | 6 ft 7 in (2.01 m) | 235 lb (107 kg) | Jr | Ole Miss | Deltona, Florida |
| G | 1 | Tyler Harris | 5 ft 9 in (1.75 m) | 150 lb (68 kg) | Jr | Memphis | Memphis, Tennessee |
| G | 2 | Nate Jenkins (W) | 6 ft 2 in (1.88 m) | 199 lb (90 kg) | So | Kettle Moraine HS | Delafield, Wisconsin |
| G | 3 | Tre Jackson | 6 ft 1 in (1.85 m) | 186 lb (84 kg) | So | Blythewood HS | Columbia, South Carolina |
| F | 4 | George Conditt IV | 6 ft 10 in (2.08 m) | 245 lb (111 kg) | Jr | Corliss HS | Chicago |
| G | 5 | Jalen Coleman-Lands | 6 ft 4 in (1.93 m) | 187 lb (85 kg) | RS Sr | DePaul | Indianapolis |
| F | 10 | Xavier Foster | 7 ft 0 in (2.13 m) | 228 lb (103 kg) | Fr | Oskaloosa | Oskaloosa, Iowa |
| F | 11 | Dudley Blackwell | 6 ft 6 in (1.98 m) | 215 lb (98 kg) | Fr | Somerset Academy Charter | Miami |
| F | 13 | Javan Johnson | 6 ft 6 in (1.98 m) | 205 lb (93 kg) | RS Jr | Troy | Decatur, Alabama |
| G | 15 | Carter Boothe (W) | 6 ft 1 in (1.85 m) | 199 lb (90 kg) | Jr | Central Decatur Community School District | Leon, Iowa |
| G | 21 | Jaden Walker | 6 ft 5 in (1.96 m) | 196 lb (89 kg) | Fr | Discovery High School | Lawrenceville, GA |
| G | 23 | Nate Schuster (W) | 6 ft 4 in (1.93 m) | 187 lb (85 kg) | Jr | Menomonee Falls HS | Menomonee Falls, Wisconsin |
| G | 25 | Eric Steyer (W) | 6 ft 5 in (1.96 m) | 180 lb (82 kg) | RS Jr | Ames HS | Ames, Iowa |
| F | 33 | Solomon Young | 6 ft 8 in (2.03 m) | 255 lb (116 kg) | RS Sr | Sacramento HS | Sacramento, California |
| G | 45 | Rasir Bolton | 6 ft 3 in (1.91 m) | 185 lb (84 kg) | Jr | Penn State | Petersburg, Virginia |
| G | 55 | Darlinstone Dubar | 6 ft 6 in (1.98 m) | 207 lb (94 kg) | Fr | Scotland Performance Institute | Charlotte, North Carolina |

Head coach

- Steve Prohm (Alabama)

Assistant coach(es)

- James Kane (Florida)
- Daniyal Robinson (Little Rock)
- William Small (Belhaven)

Legend

- (C) Team captain
- (S) Suspended
- (I) Ineligible
- (W) Walk-on
- Injured
- Current redshirt

Roster
Last update: July 1, 2020

== Schedule and results ==
This was the first season that Big 12 Now on ESPN+ aired a number of non-conference home games.

On April 22, 2020, it was reported that Iowa State would face DePaul as part of the Big 12-Big East Alliance. It was announced on June 9 that Iowa State would face Oregon in the semifinal round of the Emerald Coast Classic. On October 5, the tournament was canceled due to the ongoing COVID-19 pandemic.

Due to the ongoing coronavirus pandemic, the start of the season was pushed back from the scheduled start of November 10. On September 16, the NCAA announced that November 25 would be the new start date.

On November 9, Iowa State announced their home, non-conference schedule. On December 6, 2020, the home contest with DePaul was canceled an hour before tipoff.

| Date time, TV | Rank^{#} | Opponent^{#} | Result | Record | High points | High rebounds | High assists | Site (attendance) city, state |
Regular season
| Nov 29, 2020*; 12:00 pm, ESPN+ | | Arkansas–Pine Bluff | W 80–63 | 1–0 | 17 – Coleman-Lands | 8 – Dubar | 7 – Bolton | Hilton Coliseum (0); Ames, Iowa |
| Dec 2, 2020*; 6:00 pm, ESPN+ | | South Dakota State | L 68–71 | 1–1 | 24 – Young | 7 – Johnson | 8 – Johnson | Hilton Coliseum (0); Ames, Iowa |
| Dec 6, 2020*; 5:00 pm, ESPNU | | DePaul; Big East/Big 12 Battle | Canceled due to COVID-19 issues | | | | | Hilton Coliseum; Ames, Iowa |
| Dec 11, 2020*; 8:00 pm, BTN | | at No. 3 Iowa; Iowa Corn Cy-Hawk Series | L 77–105 | 1–2 | 20 – Johnson | 6 – Tied | 5 – Bolton | Carver–Hawkeye Arena (560); Iowa City, Iowa |
| Dec 15, 2020; 8:00 pm, ESPNU | | Kansas State | L 65–74 | 1–3 (0–1) | 19 – Bolton | 7 – Dubar | 7 – Bolton | Hilton Coliseum (1,337); Ames, Iowa |
| Dec 18, 2020; 8:00 pm, ESPNU | | at No. 8 West Virginia | L 65–70 | 1–4 (0–2) | 25 – Bolton | 7 – Young | 4 – Bolton | WVU Coliseum (347); Morgantown, West Virginia |
| Dec 20, 2020*; 12:00 pm, ESPN+ | | Jackson State | W 60–45 | 2–4 | 18 – Young | 9 – Coleman-Lands | 5 – Bolton | Hilton Coliseum (849); Ames, Iowa |
| Dec 22, 2020*; 12:00 pm, ESPN+ | | Chicago State | Canceled due to an insufficient number of players available in the CSU program | | | | | Hilton Coliseum; Ames, Iowa |
| Jan 2, 2021; 12:00 pm, ESPN+ | | No. 2 Baylor | L 65–76 | 2–5 (0–3) | 17 – Johnson | 8 – Bolton | 6 – Bolton | Hilton Coliseum (1,318); Ames, Iowa |
| Jan 5, 2021; 7:00 pm, LHN | | at No. 4 Texas | L 72–78 | 2–6 (0–4) | 21 – Johnson | 8 – Young | 3 – Tied | Frank Erwin Center (0); Austin, Texas |
| Jan 9, 2021; 3:00 pm, ESPN2 | | No. 18 Texas Tech | L 64–91 | 2–7 (0–5) | 15 – Tied | 8 – Johnson | 4 – Johnson | Hilton Coliseum (1,317); Ames, Iowa |
| Jan 13, 2021; 6:00 pm, ESPNU | | at Kansas State | Postponed due to COVID-19 issues | | | | | Bramlage Coliseum; Manhattan, Kansas |
| Jan 23, 2021; 1:00 pm/3:00 PM, ESPN2/ESPNU | | at No. 12 Texas Tech | Postponed due to COVID-19 issues | | | | | United Supermarkets Arena; Lubbock, Texas |
| Jan 25, 2021; 8:00 pm, ESPN2 | | Oklahoma State | L 60–81 | 2–8 (0–6) | 19 – Bolton | 4 – Tied | 2 – Tied | Hilton Coliseum (1,019); Ames, Iowa |
| Jan 30, 2021*; 5:00 pm, ESPN2 | | at Mississippi State; Big 12/SEC Challenge | L 56–95 | 2–9 | 18 – Bolton | 10 – Conditt IV | 2 – Tied | Humphrey Coliseum (1,000); Starkville, Mississippi |
| Feb 2, 2021; 6:00 pm, ESPN+ | | No. 17 West Virginia | L 72–76 | 2–10 (0–7) | 15 – Tied | 6 – Tied | 7 – Bolton | Hilton Coliseum (1,059); Ames, Iowa |
| Feb 6, 2021; 11:00 am, ESPN2 | | at No. 9 Oklahoma | L 72–79 | 2–11 (0–8) | 21 – Bolton | 7 – Bolton | 4 – Bolton | Lloyd Noble Center (2,734); Norman, Oklahoma |
| Feb 9, 2021; 8:00 pm, ESPNU | | at TCU | L 76–79 | 2–12 (0–9) | 26 – Bolton | 6 – Tied | 5 – Tied | Schollmaier Arena (2,203); Ft. Worth, Texas |
| Feb 11, 2021; 6:00 pm, ESPN | | at Kansas | L 64–97 | 2–13 (0–10) | 20 – Coleman-Lands | 4 – Tied | 3 – Walker | Allen Fieldhouse (2,500); Lawrence, Kansas |
| Feb 13, 2021; 2:00 pm, ABC | | Kansas | L 50-64 | 2-14 (0–11) | 20 – Coleman-Lands | 14 – Walker | 4 – Walker | Hilton Coliseum (1,320); Ames, Iowa |
| Feb 16, 2021; 3:00 pm, ESPN+ | | at Oklahoma State | L 58–76 | 2–15 (0–12) | 17 – Coleman-Lands | 7 – Johnson | 3 – Johnson | Gallagher-Iba Arena (3,350); Stillwater, Oklahoma |
| Feb 18, 2021; 6:00 pm, ESPN+ | | No. 12 Texas | Postponed due to inclement weather | | | | | Hilton Coliseum; Ames, Iowa |
| Feb 20, 2021; 5:00 pm, ESPN2 | | No. 9 Oklahoma | L 56–66 | 2–16 (0–13) | 14 – Bolton | 8 – Young | 6 – Bolton | Hilton Coliseum (1,281); Ames, Iowa |
| Feb 23, 2021; 7:00 pm, ESPN+ | | at No. 2 Baylor | L 72–77 | 2–17 (0–14) | 22 – Harris | 8 – Bolton | 6 – Bolton | Ferrell Center (2,350); Waco, Texas |
| Feb 27, 2021; 5:00 pm, ESPNU | | TCU | L 72–76 | 2–18 (0–15) | 21 – Coleman-Lands | 4 – Tied | 3 – Tied | Hilton Coliseum (1,168); Ames, Iowa |
| Mar 2, 2021; 6:00 pm, ESPN+ | | No. 15 Texas | L 67–81 | 2–19 (0–16) | 22 – Coleman-Lands | 6 – Johnson | 5 – Johnson | Hilton Coliseum (1,191); Ames, Iowa |
| Mar 4, 2021; 6:00 pm, ESPN+ | | at No. 18 Texas Tech | L 54–81 | 2–20 (0–17) | 15 – Tied | 4 – Dubar | 3 – Dubar | United Supermarkets Arena (4,010); Lubbock, Texas |
| Mar 6, 2021; 4:00 pm, ESPN+ | | at Kansas State | L 56–61 | 2–21 (0–18) | 19 – Coleman-Lands | 11 – Johnson | 4 – Johnson | Bramlage Coliseum (899); Manhattan, Kansas |
Big 12 Tournament
| Mar 10, 2021; 8:30 pm, ESPN | (10) | vs. (7) No. 25 Oklahoma; First round | L 73–79 | 2–22 | 18 – Bolton | 12 – Young | 4 – Bolton | T-Mobile Center (0); Kansas City, Missouri |
*Non-conference game. ^{#}Rankings from AP poll. (#) Tournament seedings in parentheses. All times are in Central Time.
