= 2020–21 Texas Longhorns men's basketball team =

American college basketball season

2020–21 Texas Longhorns men's basketball

Big 12 tournament champions Maui Invitational champions

NCAA tournament, First Round
- Conference: Big 12 Conference

Ranking
- Coaches: No. 21
- AP: No. 9
- Record: 19–8 (11–6 Big 12)
- Head coach: Shaka Smart (6th season)
- Assistant coaches: K. T. Turner; Neill Berry; Cody Hatt
- Home arena: Frank Erwin Center

2020–21 Big 12 men's basketball standings
	Conf.				Overall
Team	W		L	PCT	W		L	PCT
No. 1 Baylor	13	–	1	.929	28	–	2	.933
No. 16 Kansas	12	–	6	.667	21	–	9	.700
No. 21 Texas †	11	–	6	.647	19	–	8	.704
No. 18 West Virginia	11	–	6	.647	19	–	10	.655
No. 19 Oklahoma State	11	–	7	.611	21	–	9	.700
No. 22 Texas Tech	9	–	8	.529	18	–	11	.621
Oklahoma	9	–	8	.529	16	–	11	.593
TCU	5	–	11	.313	12	–	14	.462
Kansas State	4	–	14	.222	9	–	20	.310
Iowa State	0	–	18	.000	2	–	22	.083
† 2021 Big 12 Tournament winner Rankings from AP poll

The 2020–21 Texas Longhorns men's basketball team represented the University of Texas at Austin in the 2020–21 NCAA Division I men's basketball season. They were led by sixth-year head coach Shaka Smart and played their home games at the Frank Erwin Center in Austin, Texas as members of the Big 12 Conference. They finished the season 19–8, 11–6 in Big 12 play to finish in a tie for third place. As the No. 3 seed in the Big 12 tournament, they defeated Texas Tech in the first round and advanced to the tournament championship game due to COVID-19 issues at Kansas. There they defeated Oklahoma State to win the Big 12 Tournament championship. As a result, they received the conference's automatic bid to the NCAA tournament as the No. 3 seed in the East region. They were upset in the First Round by Abilene Christian.

On March 26, 2021, head coach Shaka Smart left the school to take the head coaching job at Marquette. Shortly thereafter, the school named Texas Tech coach Chris Beard the team's new head coach.

== Previous season ==
The Longhorns finished the 2019–20 season 19–12, and 9–9 in Big 12 play. They were slated to play Texas Tech in the quarterfinals of the Big 12 tournament but the tournament was canceled before the quarterfinals due to the COVID-19 pandemic. The NCAA tournament, National Invitation Tournament, and all other postseason tournaments were also canceled due to the pandemic.

== Offseason ==
=== Departures ===
Name	Number	Pos.	Height	Weight	Year	Hometown	Reason for departure
Will Baker	50	C	7'0"	245	Freshman	Austin, TX	Transferred to Nevada

=== 2020 recruiting class ===
College recruiting information
Name	Hometown	School	Height	Weight	Commit date
Greg Brown; PF	Austin, TX	Vandegrift (TX)	6 ft 9 in (2.06 m)	205 lb (93 kg)	Apr 24, 2020
Greg Brown; PF	Recruit ratings: Rivals: 247Sports: ESPN: (95)				
Overall recruit ranking: 247Sports: 96
Note: In many cases, Scout, Rivals, 247Sports, On3, and ESPN may conflict in their listings of height and weight.; In these cases, the average was taken. ESPN grades are on a 100-point scale.; Sources: "Texas 2020 Basketball Commitments". Rivals.; "2020 Texas Longhorns Recruiting Class". ESPN.; "2020 Team Ranking". Rivals.

=== 2021 Recruiting class ===
College recruiting information (2021)
Name	Hometown	School	Height	Weight	Commit date
Keeyan Itejere; PF	Knightdale, NC	Grace Christian School (NC)	6 ft 9 in (2.06 m)	190 lb (86 kg)	Jun 22, 2020
Keeyan Itejere; PF	Recruit ratings: Rivals: 247Sports: ESPN: (75)				
Emarion Ellis; SG	Davenport, IA	Assumption (IA)	6 ft 5 in (1.96 m)	175 lb (79 kg)	Jul 28, 2020
Emarion Ellis; SG	Recruit ratings: Rivals: 247Sports: ESPN: (81)				
David Joplin; PF	Milwaukee, WI	Brookfield Central (WI)	6 ft 7 in (2.01 m)	215 lb (98 kg)	Aug 16, 2020
David Joplin; PF	Recruit ratings: Rivals: 247Sports: ESPN: (78)				
Tamar Bates; SG	Kansas City, KS	IMG Academy (FL)	6 ft 5 in (1.96 m)	180 lb (82 kg)	Aug 28, 2020
Tamar Bates; SG	Recruit ratings: Rivals: 247Sports: ESPN: (85)				
Overall recruit ranking: Rivals: 20 247Sports: 13 ESPN: —
Note: In many cases, Scout, Rivals, 247Sports, On3, and ESPN may conflict in their listings of height and weight.; In these cases, the average was taken. ESPN grades are on a 100-point scale.; Sources: "Texas 2021 Basketball Commitments". Rivals.; "2021 Texas Longhorns Recruiting Class". ESPN.; "2021 Team Ranking". Rivals.

== Roster ==
2020–21 Texas Longhorns men's basketball team
Players
Coaches

Pos.	#	Name	Height	Weight	Year	Previous school	Hometown
F	0	Gerald Liddell	6 ft 8 in (2.03 m)	205 lb (93 kg)	Jr	Byron P. Steele HS	Cibolo, TX
G	1	Andrew Jones	6 ft 4 in (1.93 m)	192 lb (87 kg)	RS Jr	MacArthur HS	Irving, TX
G	2	Matt Coleman III	6 ft 2 in (1.88 m)	180 lb (82 kg)	Sr	Oak Hill Academy	Norfolk, VA
G	3	Courtney Ramey	6 ft 3 in (1.91 m)	185 lb (84 kg)	Jr	Webster Groves HS	St. Louis, MO
F	4	Greg Brown	6 ft 9 in (2.06 m)	205 lb (93 kg)	Fr	Vandegrift HS	Austin, TX
F	5	Royce Hamm Jr.	6 ft 9 in (2.06 m)	225 lb (102 kg)	Sr	Aldine Davis HS	Houston, TX
G	10	Donovan Williams	6 ft 6 in (1.98 m)	190 lb (86 kg)	So	Fort Bend Elkins HS	Houston, TX
G	13	Jase Febres	6 ft 5 in (1.96 m)	195 lb (88 kg)	Sr	Westfield HS	Houston, TX
G	14	Drayton Whiteside (W)	6 ft 0 in (1.83 m)	160 lb (73 kg)	Sr	Vandegrift HS	Austin, TX
C	20	Jericho Sims	6 ft 10 in (2.08 m)	245 lb (111 kg)	Sr	Cristo Rey Jesuit HS	Minneapolis, MN
C	22	Kai Jones	6 ft 11 in (2.11 m)	218 lb (99 kg)	So	Brewster Academy	Nassau, Bahamas
F	30	Brock Cunningham	6 ft 5 in (1.96 m)	204 lb (93 kg)	RS So	Westlake HS	Austin, TX
F	33	Kamaka Hepa	6 ft 9 in (2.06 m)	220 lb (100 kg)	Jr	Jefferson HS	Barrow, AK
F	34	Blake Nevins (W)	6 ft 5 in (1.96 m)	205 lb (93 kg)	Sr	Cypress Ranch HS	Cypress, TX

Head coach

- Shaka Smart (Kenyon)

Assistant coach(es)

- K. T. Turner (Oklahoma City)
- Neill Berry (Southeastern Louisiana)
- Cody Hatt (Norwich)

Legend

- (C) Team captain
- (S) Suspended
- (I) Ineligible
- (W) Walk-on
- Injured
- Current redshirt

Roster
Last update: December 4, 2020

== Schedule and results ==
Date time, TV	Rank^{#}	Opponent^{#}	Result	Record	High points	High rebounds	High assists	Site (attendance) city, state
Regular season
November 25, 2020*; 7:00 pm, LHN	No. 19	Texas–Rio Grande Valley	W 91–55	1–0	20 – Ramey	10 – Tied	7 – Ramey	Frank Erwin Center (2,451); Austin, TX
November 30, 2020*; 11:00 am, ESPN2	No. 19	vs. Davidson; Maui Invitational Quarterfinals	W 78–76	2–0	14 – Ramey	6 – Tied	9 – Coleman III	Harrah's Cherokee Center (0); Asheville, NC
December 1, 2020*; 12:30 pm, ESPN	No. 17	vs. Indiana; Maui Invitational Semifinals	W 66–44	3–0	16 – Coleman III	11 – Cunningham	4 – Cunningham	Harrah's Cherokee Center (0); Asheville, NC
December 2, 2020*; 3:00 pm, ESPN	No. 17	vs. No. 14 North Carolina; Maui Invitational Finals	W 69–67	4–0	22 – Coleman III	8 – K. Jones	3 – Tied	Harrah's Cherokee Center (0); Asheville, NC
December 6, 2020*; 12:00 pm, ESPN	No. 17	No. 12 Villanova; Big East-Big 12 Battle	L 64–68	4–1	17 – Tied	6 – Tied	3 – Coleman III	Frank Erwin Center (2,506); Austin, TX
December 9, 2020*; 12:00 pm, LHN	No. 13	Texas State	W 74–53	5–1	18 – Brown	9 – Sims	6 – Tied	Frank Erwin Center (2,426); Austin, TX
December 13, 2020; 2:00 pm, ESPN	No. 13	at No. 2 Baylor	Canceled due to COVID-19 issues					Ferrell Center; Waco, TX
December 16, 2020*; 7:00 pm, LHN	No. 11	Sam Houston State	W 79–63	6–1	17 – Tied	10 – Brown	6 – Ramey	Frank Erwin Center (2,411); Austin, TX
December 20, 2020; 1:00 pm, LHN	No. 11	Oklahoma State	W 77–74	7–1 (1–0)	24 – Brown	14 – Brown	4 – Tied	Frank Erwin Center (2,428); Austin, TX
December 29, 2020*; 7:00 pm, LHN	No. 8	Texas A&M–Corpus Christi	Canceled due to COVID-19 issues					Frank Erwin Center; Austin, TX
January 2, 2021; 11:00 a.m., ESPN2	No. 8	at No. 3 Kansas	W 84–59	8–1 (2–0)	18 – Ramey	12 – Sims	6 – Coleman III	Allen Fieldhouse (2,500); Lawrence, KS
January 5, 2021; 7:00 pm, LHN	No. 4	Iowa State	W 78–72	9–1 (3–0)	23 – A. Jones	9 – K. Jones	4 – Tied	Frank Erwin Center (0); Austin, TX
January 9, 2021; 12:00 p.m., ESPNU	No. 4	at No. 14 West Virginia	W 72–70	10–1 (4–0)	19 – Ramey	14 – Brown	16 – Ramey	WVU Coliseum (305); Morgantown, WV
January 13, 2021; 8:00 p.m., ESPN2	No. 4	No. 15 Texas Tech	L 77–79	10–2 (4–1)	20 – Jones	9 – Brown	4 – Ramey	Frank Erwin Center (0); Austin, TX
January 16, 2021; 7:00 pm, LHN	No. 4	Kansas State	W 82–67	11–2 (5–1)	19 – Jones	7 – Sims	9 – Ramey	Frank Erwin Center (0); Austin, TX
January 20, 2021; 7:00 p.m., ESPN+	No. 5	at Iowa State	Postponed due to COVID-19 issues; rescheduled for February 18					Hilton Coliseum; Ames, IA
January 23, 2021; 5:00 p.m., ESPN2	No. 5	at TCU	Postponed due to COVID-19 issues; rescheduled for March 7					Schollmaier Arena; Fort Worth, TX
January 26, 2021; 6:00 p.m., ESPN2	No. 5	No. 24 Oklahoma	L 79–80	11–3 (5–2)	15 – K. Jones	10 – K. Jones	5 – A. Jones	Frank Erwin Center (0); Austin, TX
January 30, 2021*; 7:00 p.m., ESPN	No. 5	at Kentucky; Big 12/SEC Challenge						Rupp Arena; Lexington, KY
February 2, 2021; 6:00 p.m., ESPN	No. 6	No. 2 Baylor	L 69–83	11–4 (5–3)	25 – Jones	9 – Sims	6 – Ramey	Frank Erwin Center (2,532); Austin, TX
February 6, 2021; 2:00 p.m., ABC	No. 6	at Oklahoma State	L 67–75 ^{2OT}	11–5 (5–4)	17 – A. Jones	10 – Tied	3 – Tied	Gallagher-Iba Arena (3,350); Stillwater, OK
February 9, 2021; 7:00 p.m., ESPN+	No. 13	at Kansas State	W 80–77	12–5 (6–4)	24 – A. Jones	9 – Sims	7 – Coleman III	Bramlage Coliseum (752); Manhattan, KS
February 13, 2021; 1:00 p.m., LHN	No. 13	TCU	W 70–55	13–5 (7–4)	19 – A. Jones	8 – Sims	5 – Ramey	Frank Erwin Center (2,431); Austin, TX
February 18, 2021; TBD	No. 12	at No. 9 Oklahoma	Postponed due to inclement weather; rescheduled for March 4					Lloyd Noble Center; Norman, OK
February 18, 2021; 6:00 p.m., ESPN+	No. 12	at Iowa State	Postponed due to inclement weather; rescheduled for March 2					Hilton Coliseum; Ames, IA
February 20, 2021; 2:00 p.m., ABC	No. 12	No. 13 West Virginia	L 82–84	13–6 (7–5)	28 – Ramey	8 – A. Jones	7 – Coleman III	Frank Erwin Center (0); Austin, TX
February 23, 2021; 8:00 p.m., ESPN	No. 14	No. 17 Kansas	W 75–72 ^{OT}	14–6 (8–5)	15 – Ramey	10 – Jones	5 – Coleman III	Frank Erwin Center (2,482); Austin, TX
February 27, 2021; 11:00 a.m., CBS	No. 14	at No. 18 Texas Tech	L 59–68	14–7 (8–6)	11 – Sims	7 – Sims	6 – Coleman III	United Supermarkets Arena (4,250); Lubbock, TX
March 2, 2021; 6:00 p.m., ESPN+	No. 15	at Iowa State	W 81–67	15–7 (9–6)	17 – K. Jones	7 – Ramey	5 – Coleman	Hilton Coliseum (1,191); Ames, IA
March 4, 2021; 8:00 p.m., ESPN	No. 15	at No. 16 Oklahoma	W 69–65	16–7 (10–6)	16 – Sims	12 – Sims	4 – Ramey	Lloyd Noble Center (2,952); Norman, OK
March 7, 2021; 6:00 p.m., ESPN+	No. 15	at TCU	W 76-64	17–7 (11–6)	16 – A. Jones	5 – A. Jones	6 – Ramey	Schollmaier Arena (2,229); Fort Worth, TX
Big 12 Tournament
March 11, 2021; 8:30 p.m., ESPN	(3) No. 13	vs. (6) No. 20 Texas Tech; Quarterfinals	W 67–66	18–7	19 – Coleman	11 – Sims	6 – Coleman	T-Mobile Center (3,510); Kansas City, MO
March 12, 2021; 8:30 p.m., ESPN2	(3) No. 13	vs. (2) No. 11 Kansas; Semifinals	Cancelled due to positive COVID-19 test from Kansas					T-Mobile Center; Kansas City, MO
March 13, 2021; 5:00 p.m., ESPN	(3) No. 13	vs. (5) No. 12 Oklahoma State; Championship	W 91–86	19–7	30 – Coleman	14 – Sims	5 – Ramey	T-Mobile Center (3,525); Kansas City, MO
NCAA tournament
March 20, 2021; 8:50 pm, truTV, TNT (Note: The game against Abilene Christian, which was originally scheduled to air exclusively on truTV, was simulcasted on TNT after the Oregon-VCU game, which was scheduled to air on the latter network around the same time, was cancelled due to VCU having to withdraw from the tournament due to COVID-19 protocols.)	(3 E) No. 9	vs. (14 E) Abilene Christian; First Round	L 52–53	19–8	13 – Jones	11 – Sims	5 – Jones	Lucas Oil Stadium; Indianapolis, IN
*Non-conference game. ^{#}Rankings from AP Poll. (#) Tournament seedings in parentheses. All times are in Central Time.

== Player statistics ==
Legend
GP	Games played	GS	Games started	MPG	Minutes per game
FG%	Field-goal percentage	3P%	3-point field-goal percentage	FT%	Free-throw percentage
RPG	Rebounds per game	APG	Assists per game	SPG	Steals per game
BPG	Blocks per game	PPG	Points per game

* – Recorded statistics when playing for Texas

Texas Longhorns Men’s Basketball statistics
Player	GP	GS	MPG	FG%	3P%	FT%	RPG	APG	SPG	BPG	PPG
Andrew Jones	19	19	31.7	.406	.302	.807	5.0	2.11	1.11	0.11	15.4
Courtney Ramey	19	19	34.4	.417	.437	.831	2.8	3.95	0.95	0.11	14.1
Matt Coleman III	20	20	34.4	.476	.353	.800	3.9	4.25	1.20	0.10	13.0
Greg Brown	19	19	22.5	.426	.351	.672	7.4	0.26	0.63	1.11	10.9
Kai Jones	19	2	22.7	.582	.423	.660	4.8	0.74	0.95	0.74	8.2
Jericho Sims	19	19	23.5	.640	.000	.520	6.8	0.58	0.58	0.84	8.1
Donovan Williams	12	0	12.3	.327	.174	.846	1.2	0.25	0.42	0.25	4.1
Kamaka Hepa	7	1	7.6	.471	.500	.000	1.0	0.14	0.14	0.29	3.4
Jase Febres	6	0	14.1	.286	.263	.000	1.7	0.67	0.50	.50	2.0
Royce Hamm Jr.	16	1	10.4	.559	.500	.300	2.9	0.19	0.13	0.50	2.6
Gerald Liddell	7	0	11.5	.429	.286	.167	1.7	0.43	0.14	0.14	2.1
Brock Cunningham	18	0	16.8	.237	.233	.333	3.4	0.94	0.89	0.11	1.4
Blake Nevins	2	0	0.6	.500	.000	.000	0.0	0.0	0.0	0.0	0.0
Andrew Deutser	1	0	1.1	.000	.000	.000	0.0	0.0	0.0	0.0	0.0
Drayton Whiteside	2	0	0.9	.000	.000	.000	0.0	0.0	0.0	0.0	0.0

== Rankings ==
Ranking movements Legend: ██ Increase in ranking ██ Decrease in ranking т = Tied with team above or below
	Week																		
Poll	Pre	1	2	3	4	5	6	7	8	9	10	11	12	13	14	15	16	17	Final
AP	19	17т	13т	11	10	8	4	4	4	5	5	6	13	12	14	15	13	9	Not released
Coaches	22	22^	12	11	10	9	4	4	4	5	5	6	13	13	16	16	16	9	21

^Coaches did not release a Week 1 poll.
