= 2020–21 Texas Tech Red Raiders basketball team =

American college basketball season

2020–21 Texas Tech Red Raiders basketball

NCAA tournament, Second Round
- Conference: Big 12 Conference

Ranking
- Coaches: No. 22
- AP: No. 21
- Record: 18–11 (9–8 Big 12)
- Head coach: Chris Beard (5th season)
- Assistant coaches: Mark Adams (5th season); Bob Donewald Jr. (1st season); Ulric Maligi (2nd season)
- Home arena: United Supermarkets Arena

2020–21 Big 12 men's basketball standings
	Conf.				Overall
Team	W		L	PCT	W		L	PCT
No. 1 Baylor	13	–	1	.929	28	–	2	.933
No. 16 Kansas	12	–	6	.667	21	–	9	.700
No. 21 Texas †	11	–	6	.647	19	–	8	.704
No. 18 West Virginia	11	–	6	.647	19	–	10	.655
No. 19 Oklahoma State	11	–	7	.611	21	–	9	.700
No. 22 Texas Tech	9	–	8	.529	18	–	11	.621
Oklahoma	9	–	8	.529	16	–	11	.593
TCU	5	–	11	.313	12	–	14	.462
Kansas State	4	–	14	.222	9	–	20	.310
Iowa State	0	–	18	.000	2	–	22	.083
† 2021 Big 12 Tournament winner Rankings from AP poll

The 2020–21 Texas Tech Red Raiders basketball team represented Texas Tech University in the 2020–21 NCAA Division I men's basketball season as a member of the Big 12 Conference. The Red Raiders were led by fifth-year coach Chris Beard. They played their home games at the United Supermarkets Arena in Lubbock, Texas. They finished the season 18–11, 9–8 in Big 12 Play to tie for 6th place. They lost in the quarterfinals of the Big 12 tournament to Texas. They received an at-large bid to the NCAA tournament where they defeated Utah State in the First Round before losing in the Second Round to Arkansas.

== Previous season ==
The Red Raiders finished the season 18–13, 9–9 in Big 12 play to finish in 6th place in the division. They were scheduled to play Texas in the quarterfinals of the Big 12 tournament before the tournament was canceled due to the ongoing COVID-19 pandemic. All postseason play, including the NCAA tournament, was also canceled due to the pandemic.

== Offseason ==
=== Departures ===
Name	Number	Pos.	Height	Weight	Year	Hometown	Reason for departure
Jahmi'us Ramsey	3	G	6'4"	195	Freshman	Arlington, TX	Declared for the NBA draft; selected 43rd overall by the Sacramento Kings.
Joel Ntambwe	5	F	6'8"	220	Freshman	Kinshasa, DR Congo	Left the program for personal reasons
Andrei Savrasov	12	F	6'7"	225	RS Freshman	Orenburg, Russia	Transferred to Georgia Southern
T. J. Holyfield	22	F	6'8"	225	Senior	Albuquerque, NM	Graduated
Davide Moretti	25	G	6'3"	180	Junior	Bologna, Italy	Opted out of senior season to play professionally in Europe; signed with Olimpia Milano.
Chris Clarke	44	G	6'6"	220	Senior	Virginia Beach, VA	Graduated
Russel Tchewa	54	C	7'0"	260	Freshman	Douala, Cameroon	Transferred to South Florida

=== Incoming transfers ===
Texas Tech added three players, Marcus Santos-Silva, Mac McClung, and Jamarius Burton as transfers. On April 29, 2020, Santos-Silva announced he was transferring in from VCU. On May 27, 2020, McClung announced that he was transferring in from Georgetown. On September 17, 2020, Burton received a waiver from the NCAA and thus became immediately eligible following his transfer from Wichita State.

Name	Number	Pos.	Height	Weight	Year	Hometown	Previous school
Mac McClung	0	G	6'2"	185	Junior	Gate City, VA	Georgetown
Jamarius Burton	2	G	6'4"	205	Junior	Charlotte, NC	Wichita State
Marcus Santos-Silva	14	F	6'7"	245	Senior	Taunton, MA	VCU

== Recruits ==
=== Recruiting class of 2020 ===
College recruiting
Name	Hometown	School	Height	Weight	Commit date
Micah Peavy #5 SG	Cibolo, TX	Duncanville High School	6 ft 7 in (2.01 m)	215 lb (98 kg)	Nov 4, 2019
Micah Peavy #5 SG	Recruit ratings: Rivals: 247Sports: ESPN:				
Chibuzo Agbo #23 SG	San Diego, CA	St. Augustine High School	6 ft 7 in (2.01 m)	215 lb (98 kg)	Aug 12, 2019
Chibuzo Agbo #23 SG	Recruit ratings: Rivals: 247Sports: ESPN:				
Nimari Burnett #25 CG	Chicago, IL	Prolific Prep	6 ft 4 in (1.93 m)	195 lb (88 kg)	Nov 12, 2019
Nimari Burnett #25 CG	Recruit ratings: Rivals: 247Sports: ESPN:				
Vladislav Goldin #50 PF	Nalchik, Russia	Putnam Science Academy	7 ft 1 in (2.16 m)	240 lb (110 kg)	Jul 9, 2020
Vladislav Goldin #50 PF	Recruit ratings: Rivals: 247Sports:				
Overall recruit ranking:
Note: In many cases, Scout, Rivals, 247Sports, On3, and ESPN may conflict in their listings of height and weight.; In these cases, the average was taken. ESPN grades are on a 100-point scale.; Sources: "2020 Team Ranking". Rivals.

== Roster ==
2020–21 Texas Tech Red Raiders men's basketball team
Players
Coaches

Pos.	#	Name	Height	Weight	Year	Previous school	Hometown
G	0	Mac McClung	6 ft 2 in (1.88 m)	185 lb (84 kg)	Jr	Georgetown	Gate City, VA
G	1	Terrence Shannon Jr.	6 ft 6 in (1.98 m)	210 lb (95 kg)	So	IMG Academy	Chicago, IL
G	2	Jamarius Burton	6 ft 4 in (1.93 m)	205 lb (93 kg)	Jr	Wichita State	Charlotte, NC
G	3	Clarence Nadolny	6 ft 3 in (1.91 m)	190 lb (86 kg)	So	Scotland Performance Institute	Montreuil, France
G	5	Micah Peavy	6 ft 7 in (2.01 m)	215 lb (98 kg)	Fr	Duncanville	Cibolo, TX
F	10	Tyreek Smith	6 ft 7 in (2.01 m)	220 lb (100 kg)	RS Fr	Trinity Christian	Baton Rouge, LA
G	11	Kyler Edwards	6 ft 4 in (1.93 m)	195 lb (88 kg)	Jr	Findlay Prep	Arlington, TX
F	14	Marcus Santos-Silva	6 ft 7 in (2.01 m)	245 lb (111 kg)	Sr	VCU	Taunton, MA
G	15	Kevin McCullar Jr.	6 ft 6 in (1.98 m)	205 lb (93 kg)	RS So	Karen Wagner	San Antonio, TX
G	21	Avery Benson (W)	6 ft 4 in (1.93 m)	195 lb (88 kg)	RS Jr	Southwest Christian Academy	Springdale, AR
G	23	Chibuzo Agbo	6 ft 7 in (2.01 m)	215 lb (98 kg)	Fr	St. Augustine	San Diego, CA
F	50	Vladislav Goldin	7 ft 1 in (2.16 m)	240 lb (109 kg)	Fr	Putnam Science Academy	Nalchik, Russia

Head coach

- Chris Beard (Texas)

Assistant coach(es)

- Mark Adams (Texas Tech)
- Bob Donewald Jr. (Western Michigan)
- Ulric Maligi (Howard)

Legend

- (C) Team captain
- (S) Suspended
- (I) Ineligible
- (W) Walk-on
- Injured
- Current redshirt

Roster
Last update: December 27, 2020

== Schedule and results ==
Date time, TV	Rank^{#}	Opponent^{#}	Result	Record	High points	High rebounds	High assists	Site (attendance) city, state
Regular season
November 25, 2020*; 6:00 pm, ESPN+	No. 14	Northwestern State	W 101–58	1–0	20 – McClung	13 – Santos-Silva	7 – Edwards	United Supermarkets Arena (3,345); Lubbock, TX
November 27, 2020*; 1:00 pm, ESPNU	No. 14	Sam Houston State	W 84–52	2–0	18 – McClung	10 – Santos-Silva	3 – Shannon Jr.	United Supermarkets Arena (3,176); Lubbock, TX
November 29, 2020*; 4:30 pm, ESPN2	No. 14	vs. No. 17 Houston; Southwest Showcase	L 53–64	2–1	16 – McClung	6 – Edwards	3 – Edwards	Dickies Arena (3,568); Fort Worth, TX
December 3, 2020*; 8:00 pm, ESPN	No. 17	St. John's; Big East/Big 12 Battle	Canceled due to COVID-19 issues					United Supermarkets Arena; Lubbock, TX
December 4, 2020*; 8:00 pm, ESPN2	No. 17	Troy	W 80–46	3–1	20 – McClung	7 – Santos-Silva	5 – Tied	United Supermarkets Arena (4,032); Lubbock, TX
December 6, 2020*; 1:00 pm, ESPNU	No. 17	Grambling State	W 81–40	4–1	13 – Edwards	11 – Edwards	5 – Edwards	United Supermarkets Arena (3,283); Lubbock, TX
December 9, 2020*; 6:00 pm, ESPN+	No. 17	Abilene Christian	W 51–44	5–1	19 – Edwards	7 – Edwards	3 – Burton	United Supermarkets Arena (4,175); Lubbock, TX
December 12, 2020*; 1:00 pm, Texas Tech TV	No. 17	vs. Texas A&M–Corpus Christi	W 77–57	6–1	15 – Shannon Jr.	7 – Shannon Jr.	6 – McClung	Comerica Center (1,380); Frisco, TX
December 17, 2020; 6:00 pm, ESPN	No. 14	vs. No. 5 Kansas	L 57–58	6–2 (0–1)	21 – McClung	9 – Shannon Jr.	3 – Santos-Silva	United Supermarkets Arena (4,250); Lubbock, TX
December 22, 2020; 6:00 pm, ESPN2	No. 15	at Oklahoma	W 69–67	7–2 (1–1)	21 – Shannon Jr.	9 – Edwards	4 – McClung	Lloyd Noble Center (1,328); Norman, OK
December 29, 2020*; 6:00 pm, ESPN+	No. 13	Incarnate Word	W 79–51	8–2	11 – Tied	7 – Edwards	4 – Burnett	United Supermarkets Arena (3,850); Lubbock, TX
January 2, 2021; 3:00 pm, ESPN+	No. 13	Oklahoma State	L 77–82 ^{OT}	8–3 (1–2)	21 – McClung	7 – Tied	3 – Edwards	United Supermarkets Arena (4,013); Lubbock, TX
January 5, 2021; 6:00 pm, ESPN2	No. 18	Kansas State	W 82–71	9–3 (2–2)	22 – Shannon Jr.	7 – McCullar Jr.	2 – Tied	United Supermarkets Arena (3,523); Lubbock, TX
January 9, 2021; 3:00 pm, ESPN2	No. 18	at Iowa State	W 91–64	10–3 (3–2)	19 – Edwards	11 – McCullar Jr.	6 – Shannon Jr.	Hilton Coliseum (1,317); Ames, IA
January 13, 2021; 8:00 pm, ESPN2	No. 15	at No. 4 Texas	W 79–77	11–3 (4–2)	22 – McClung	8 – McCullar Jr.	2 – Tied	Frank Erwin Center (0); Austin, TX
January 16, 2021; 3:00 pm, ESPN	No. 15	No. 2 Baylor	L 60–68	11–4 (4–3)	24 – McClung	11 – Santos-Silva	3 – McCullar Jr.	United Supermarkets Arena (4,250); Lubbock, TX
January 20, 2021; 7:00 pm, ESPN+	No. 12	at TCU	Postponed due to COVID-19 issues					Schollmaier Arena; Fort Worth, TX
January 23, 2021; 3:00 pm, ESPN2/ESPNU	No. 12	Iowa State	Postponed due to COVID-19 issues					United Supermarkets Arena; Lubbock, TX
January 25, 2021; 8:00 pm, ESPN	No. 10	at No. 11 West Virginia	L 87–88	11–5 (4–4)	30 – McClung	8 – Tied	4 – McCullar Jr.	WVU Coliseum (339); Morgantown, WV
January 30, 2021*; 1:00 pm, ESPN2	No. 10	at LSU; Big 12/SEC Challenge	W 76–71	12–5	23 – Shannon Jr.	12 – Santos-Silva	3 – Tied	Pete Maravich Assembly Center (2,808); Baton Rouge, LA
February 1, 2021; 8:00 pm, ESPN	No. 13	No. 9 Oklahoma	W 57–52	13–5 (5–4)	15 – Shannon Jr.	8 – Tied	2 – Tied	United Supermarkets Arena (4,250); Lubbock, TX
February 6, 2021; 3:00 pm, ESPN+	No. 13	at Kansas State	W 73–62	14–5 (6–4)	23 – McClung	8 – Edwards	5 – Santos-Silva	Bramlage Coliseum (1,000); Manhattan, KS
February 9, 2021; 8:00 pm, ESPN	No. 7	No. 14 West Virginia	L 71–82	14–6 (6–5)	17 – McClung	7 – Edwards	6 – Edwards	United Supermarkets Arena (4,500); Lubbock, TX
February 13, 2021; 1:00 pm, ESPN2	No. 7	at No. 2 Baylor	Postponed due to COVID-19 issues					Ferrell Center; Waco, TX
February 16, 2021; TBA, TBA	No. 15	TCU	Postponed due to inclement weather					United Supermarkets Arena; Lubbock, TX
February 18, 2021; TBA, TBA	No. 15	at TCU	Postponed due to inclement weather					Schollmaier Arena; Fort Worth, TX
February 20, 2021; 1:00 pm, ESPN	No. 15	at No. 23 Kansas	L 61–67	14–7 (6–6)	12 – Tied	8 – Santos-Silva	4 – McClung	Allen Fieldhouse (2,500); Lawrence, KS
February 22, 2021; 8:00 pm, ESPN	No. 18	at Oklahoma State	L 69–74 ^{OT}	14–8 (6–7)	18 – Shannon Jr.	8 – Santos-Silva	3 – Tied	Gallagher-Iba Arena (3,350); Stillwater, OK
February 27, 2021; 11:00 am, CBS	No. 18	No. 14 Texas	W 68–59	15–8 (7–7)	16 – McClung	9 – Santos-Silva	4 – Tied	United Supermarkets Arena (4,250); Lubbock, TX
March 2, 2021; 6:00 pm, ESPN+	No. 18	TCU	W 69–49	16–8 (8–7)	20 – Edwards	7 – Peavy	6 – McClung	United Supermarkets Arena (4,077); Lubbock, TX
March 4, 2021; 6:00 pm, ESPN+	No. 18	Iowa State	W 81–54	17–8 (9–7)	20 – McClung	7 – Tied	3 – Peavy	United Supermarkets Arena (4,010); Lubbock, TX
March 7, 2021; 3:00 pm, ESPN	No. 18	at No. 3 Baylor	L 73–88	17–9 (9–8)	18 – Edwards	5 – Edwards	5 – Shannon Jr.	Ferrell Center (2,350); Waco, TX
Big 12 Tournament
March 11, 2021; 8:30 pm, ESPN	(6) No. 20	vs. (3) No. 13 Texas; Quarterfinals	L 66–67	17–10	18 – Shannon Jr.	9 – Santos-Silva	4 – Tied	T-Mobile Center (3,510); Kansas City, MO
NCAA tournament
March 19, 2021; 12:45 pm, TNT	(6 S) No. 21	vs. (11 S) Utah State; First Round	W 65–53	18–10	16 – McClung	7 – McCullar Jr.	4 – Edwards	Simon Skjodt Assembly Hall; Bloomington, IN
March 21, 2021; 5:10 pm, TNT	(6 S) No. 21	vs. (3 S) No. 10 Arkansas; Second Round	L 66–68	18–11	20 – Shannon Jr.	8 – Tied	5 – Edwards	Hinkle Fieldhouse; Indianapolis, IN
*Non-conference game. ^{#}Rankings from AP Poll. (#) Tournament seedings in parentheses. All times are in Central Time.

== Rankings ==
Ranking movements Legend: ██ Increase in ranking ██ Decrease in ranking т = Tied with team above or below
	Week																
Poll	Pre	1	2	3	4	5	6	7	8	9	10	11	12	13	14	15	Final
AP	14	17	17	14	15	13	18	15	12	10	7	15	18	18	20т	21	Not released
Coaches	13	13*	17	14	16	14	19	15	13	10	8	11	17	18	22	21	22

*AP does not release post-NCAA tournament rankings. No Coaches Poll for Week 1.
