= 2021 Big 12 men's basketball tournament =

- Classification: Division I
- Season: 2020–21
- Teams: 10
- Site: T-Mobile Center; Kansas City, Missouri
- Champions: Texas (1st title)
- Winning coach: Shaka Smart (1st title)
- MVP: Matt Coleman III (Texas)
- Attendance: 17,307; 3,525 (championship)
- Top scorer: Cade Cunningham (Oklahoma State) (71 points)
- Television: ESPN, ESPN2

2020–21 Big 12 men's basketball standings
	Conf.				Overall
Team	W		L	PCT	W		L	PCT
No. 1 Baylor	13	–	1	.929	28	–	2	.933
No. 16 Kansas	12	–	6	.667	21	–	9	.700
No. 21 Texas †	11	–	6	.647	19	–	8	.704
No. 18 West Virginia	11	–	6	.647	19	–	10	.655
No. 19 Oklahoma State	11	–	7	.611	21	–	9	.700
No. 22 Texas Tech	9	–	8	.529	18	–	11	.621
Oklahoma	9	–	8	.529	16	–	11	.593
TCU	5	–	11	.313	12	–	14	.462
Kansas State	4	–	14	.222	9	–	20	.310
Iowa State	0	–	18	.000	2	–	22	.083
† 2021 Big 12 Tournament winner Rankings from AP poll

The 2021 Phillips 66 Big 12 men's basketball tournament was a postseason men's basketball tournament for the Big 12 Conference. It was played from March 10 to 13, in Kansas City, Missouri at the T-Mobile Center. The winner received the conference's automatic bid to the 2021 NCAA tournament. Texas defeated Oklahoma State in the championship to earn their first Big 12 Tournament Championship and third Conference tournament Championship overall. Texas became the first school that was not a member of the Big Eight Conference to win the tournament.

== Seeds ==
All ten teams participated in the tournament. The top six teams earned a first-round bye.

Teams were seeded by record within the conference, with a tiebreaker system to seed teams with identical conference records. What tiebreakers were used for each tie is included in the table.

Seed	School	Conf	Tiebreaker 1	Tiebreaker 2	Tiebreaker 3
1	Baylor	13–1			
2	Kansas	12–6			
3	Texas	11–6	1–1 vs. West Virginia	0–1 vs. Baylor	2–0 vs. Kansas
4	West Virginia	11–6	1–1 vs. Texas	0–1 vs. Baylor	1–1 vs. Kansas
5	Oklahoma State	11–7			
6	Texas Tech	9–8	2–0 vs. Oklahoma		
7	Oklahoma	9–8	0–2 vs. Texas Tech		
8	TCU	5–11			
9	Kansas State	4–14			
10	Iowa State	0–18			

== Schedule ==
All games had limited attendance due to the COVID-19 pandemic.

Game	Time	Matchup^{#}	Final score	Television	Attendance
First round – Wednesday, March 10
1	5:30 pm	No. 8 TCU vs No. 9 Kansas State	50–71	ESPN	N/A*
2	8:30 pm	No. 7 Oklahoma vs No. 10 Iowa State	79–73	ESPN	N/A*
Quarterfinals – Thursday, March 11
3	10:30 am	No. 4 West Virginia vs No. 5 Oklahoma State	69–72	ESPN	3,491
4	1:30 pm	No. 1 Baylor vs No. 9 Kansas State	74–68	ESPN	3,491
5	5:30 pm	No. 2 Kansas vs No. 7 Oklahoma	69–62	ESPN	3,510
6	8:30 pm	No. 3 Texas vs No. 6 Texas Tech	67–66	ESPN2	3,510
Semifinals – Friday, March 12
7	5:30 pm	No. 1 Baylor vs No. 5 Oklahoma State	74–83	ESPN	3,298
8	8:30 pm	No. 2 Kansas vs No. 3 Texas	Cancelled (Note: Kansas withdrew from the Big 12 Tournament after a player tested positive for COVID-19, which led to the game being cancelled, and Texas advancing in the tournament.)		
Championship – Saturday, March 13
9	5:00 pm	No. 3 Texas vs No. 5 Oklahoma State	91–86	ESPN	3,525
Game times in CST. No.-Rankings denote tournament seed

*No official attendance announced

== Bracket ==
First round Wednesday, March 10
8	TCU	50
9	Kansas State	71
7	Oklahoma	79
10	Iowa State	73

Quarterfinals; Thursday, March 11
1	Baylor	74
9	Kansas State	68
4	West Virginia	69
5	Oklahoma State	72
2	Kansas	69
7	Oklahoma	62
3	Texas	67
6	Texas Tech	66

Semifinals; Friday, March 12
1	Baylor	74
5	Oklahoma State	83
2	~~Kansas~~
3	Texas

Championship; Saturday, March 13
5	Oklahoma State	86
3	Texas	91
