= 2020–21 TCU Horned Frogs men's basketball team =

American college basketball season

2020–21 TCU Horned Frogs men's basketball

Hall of Fame Classic champions
- Conference: Big 12 Conference
- Record: 12–14 (5–11 Big 12)
- Head coach: Jamie Dixon (5th season)
- Assistant coaches: Ryan Miller (5th season); Tony Benford; Duane Broussard
- Home arena: Schollmaier Arena

2020–21 Big 12 men's basketball standings
	Conf.				Overall
Team	W		L	PCT	W		L	PCT
No. 1 Baylor	13	–	1	.929	28	–	2	.933
No. 16 Kansas	12	–	6	.667	21	–	9	.700
No. 21 Texas †	11	–	6	.647	19	–	8	.704
No. 18 West Virginia	11	–	6	.647	19	–	10	.655
No. 19 Oklahoma State	11	–	7	.611	21	–	9	.700
No. 22 Texas Tech	9	–	8	.529	18	–	11	.621
Oklahoma	9	–	8	.529	16	–	11	.593
TCU	5	–	11	.313	12	–	14	.462
Kansas State	4	–	14	.222	9	–	20	.310
Iowa State	0	–	18	.000	2	–	22	.083
† 2021 Big 12 Tournament winner Rankings from AP poll

The 2020–21 TCU Horned Frogs men's basketball team represented Texas Christian University during the 2020–21 NCAA Division I men's basketball season. The team is led by fifth-year head coach Jamie Dixon, and plays their home games at Schollmaier Arena in Fort Worth, Texas as a member of the Big 12 Conference. They finished the season 12-14, 5-11 in Big 12 Play to finish in 8th place.

They lost in the first round of the Big 12 tournament to Kansas State.

== Previous season ==
They finished the season 16–15, 7–11 in Big 12 play to finish in a tie for seventh place. They lost in the first round of the Big 12 tournament to Kansas State.

== Roster ==
2020–21 TCU Horned Frogs men's basketball team
Players
Coaches

Pos.	#	Name	Height	Weight	Year	Previous school	Hometown
C	0	Eddie Lampkin Jr.	6 ft 11 in (2.11 m)	295 lb (134 kg)	Fr	Morton Ranch High School	Katy, Texas
G	1	Mike Miles Jr.	6 ft 2 in (1.88 m)	195 lb (88 kg)	Fr	Lancaster High School	Lancaster, Texas
F	2	Mickey Pearson Jr.	6 ft 7 in (2.01 m)	210 lb (95 kg)	RS Fr	Hargrave Military Academy	Lincoln, Alabama
G	3	Francisco Farabello	6 ft 3 in (1.91 m)	183 lb (83 kg)	So	NBA Global Academy	Cañada de Gómez, Argentina
G	4	PJ Fuller	6 ft 4 in (1.93 m)	175 lb (79 kg)	So	Findlay Prep	Seattle, Washington
F	5	Chuck O'Bannon Jr.	6 ft 6 in (1.98 m)	215 lb (98 kg)	RS Jr	USC	Las Vegas, Nevada
G	11	Taryn Todd	6 ft 5 in (1.96 m)	180 lb (82 kg)	RS Fr	Findlay Prep	Vaughan, Ontario, Canada
G	13	Dylan Arnette	6 ft 3 in (1.91 m)	185 lb (84 kg)	RS So	Dallas Carter High School	DeSoto, Texas
F	15	Terren Frank	6 ft 8 in (2.03 m)	235 lb (107 kg)	Fr	Sierra Canyon School	Los Angeles, California
C	21	Kevin Samuel	6 ft 11 in (2.11 m)	255 lb (116 kg)	RS Jr	Redemption Christian Academy (TX)	Codrington Village, Barbuda
G	22	RJ Nembhard	6 ft 5 in (1.96 m)	200 lb (91 kg)	RS Jr	Keller High School	Keller, Texas
F	23	Jaedon LeDee	6 ft 9 in (2.06 m)	240 lb (109 kg)	Jr	Ohio State	Houston, Texas
G	30	Harrison Young	5 ft 11 in (1.8 m)	180 lb (82 kg)	Jr	Impact Basketball Academy	Auckland, New Zealand
G	31	Owen Aschieris	6 ft 2 in (1.88 m)	175 lb (79 kg)	Sr	Santa Fe Christian Schools	San Diego, California
F	34	Kevin Easley Jr.	6 ft 7 in (2.01 m)	225 lb (102 kg)	RS So	Chattanooga	Indianapolis, Indiana

Head coach

- Jamie Dixon (TCU)

Assistant coach(es)

- Tony Benford (Texas Tech)
- Ryan Miller (Northern State)
- Duane Broussard (Bradley)

Legend

- (C) Team captain
- (S) Suspended
- (I) Ineligible
- (W) Walk-on
- Injured
- Current redshirt

Roster
Last update: April 30, 2021

== Schedule and results ==
Date time, TV	Rank^{#}	Opponent^{#}	Result	Record	Site (attendance) city, state
Regular season
November 25, 2020*; 7:00 p.m., ESPN+		Houston Baptist	W 69–45	1–0	Schollmaier Arena (1,672); Fort Worth, TX
November 28, 2020*; 6:30 p.m., ESPN3		vs. Tulsa; Hall of Fame Classic Semifinals	W 70–65	2–0	Sprint Center (0); Kansas City, MO
November 29, 2020*; 2:30 p.m., ESPN2		vs. Liberty; Hall of Fame Classic Championship	W 56–52	3–0	Sprint Center (0); Kansas City, MO
December 3, 2020*; 7:00 p.m., ESPN+		Northwestern State	W 74–68	4–0	Schollmaier Arena (1,659); Fort Worth, TX
December 6, 2020; 3:00 p.m., ESPN2		Oklahoma	L 78–82	4–1 (0–1)	Schollmaier Arena (1,747); Fort Worth, TX
December 9, 2020*; 4:00 p.m., ESPNU		Providence	L 70–79	4–2	Schollmaier Arena (1,620); Fort Worth, TX
December 12, 2020*; 1:00 p.m., ESPN+		vs. Texas A&M	W 73–55	5–2	Dickies Arena (0); Fort Worth, TX
December 16, 2020; 6:00 p.m., ESPN		at Oklahoma State	W 77–76	6–2 (1–1)	Gallagher-Iba Arena (3,350); Stillwater, OK
December 22, 2020*; 8:00 p.m., ESPNU		North Dakota State	W 88–82	7–2	Schollmaier Arena (1,669); Fort Worth, TX
December 30, 2020*; 7:00 p.m., ESPN+		Prairie View	W 66–61	8–2	Schollmaier Arena (1,688); Fort Worth, TX
January 2, 2021; 1:00 p.m., ESPNU		at Kansas State	W 67–60	9–2 (2–1)	Bramlage Coliseum (798); Manhattan, KS
January 5, 2021; 9:00 p.m., ESPN		No. 6 Kansas	L 64-93	9–3 (2–2)	Schollmaier Arena (1,894); Fort Worth, TX
January 9, 2021; 1:00 p.m., ESPN		No. 2 Baylor	L 49-67	9-4 (2-3)	Schollmaier Arena (1,891); Fort Worth, TX
January 12, 2021; 6:30 p.m., ESPN+		at Oklahoma	L 46-82	9–5 (2–4)	Lloyd Noble Center (1,921); Norman, OK
January 16, 2021; 1:00 p.m., ESPN+		at No. 13 West Virginia	Postponed due to COVID-19 issues		WVU Coliseum; Morgantown, WV
January 20, 2021; 7:00 p.m., ESPN+		No. 12 Texas Tech	Postponed due to COVID-19 issues		Schollmaier Arena; Fort Worth, TX
January 23, 2021; 5:00 p.m., ESPN2		No. 5 Texas	Postponed due to COVID-19 issues		Schollmaier Arena; Fort Worth, TX
January 26, 2021; 7:00 p.m., ESPN+		at No. 15 Kansas	L 51-59	9-6 (2-5)	Allen Fieldhouse (2,500); Lawrence, KS
January 30, 2021*; 1:00 p.m., ESPNU		at No. 12 Missouri; Big 12/SEC Challenge	L 98-102 ^{OT}	9-7	Mizzou Arena (3,063); Columbia, MO
February 3, 2021; 8:00 p.m., ESPN2		Oklahoma State	W 81–78	10–7 (3–5)	Schollmaier Arena (2,481); Fort Worth, TX
February 6, 2021; 3:00 p.m., ESPN+		at No. 2 Baylor	Postponed due to COVID-19 issues		Ferrell Center; Waco, TX
February 9, 2021; 8:00 p.m., ESPNU		Iowa State	W 79–76	11–7 (4–5)	Schollmaier Arena (2,023); Fort Worth, TX
February 13, 2021; 1:00 p.m., LHN		at No. 13 Texas	L 55–70	11–8 (4–6)	Erwin Center (2,431); Austin, TX
February 16, 2021; TBA, TBA		at No. 15 Texas Tech	Postponed due to inclement weather		United Supermarkets Arena; Lubbock, TX
February 18, 2021; TBA, TBA		No. 15 Texas Tech	Postponed due to inclement weather		Schollmaier Arena; Fort Worth, TX
February 20, 2021; 4:00 p.m., ESPN+		Kansas State	L 54–62	11–9 (4–7)	Schollmaier Arena (2,145); Fort Worth, TX
February 23, 2021; 6:00 p.m., ESPN2		No. 10 West Virginia	L 66–74	11–10 (4–8)	Schollmaier Arena (1,877); Fort Worth, TX
February 27, 2021; 5:00 p.m., ESPNU		at Iowa State	W 76–72	12–10 (5–8)	Hilton Coliseum (1,168); Ames, IA
March 2, 2021; 6:00 p.m., ESPN+		at No. 18 Texas Tech	L 49–69	12–11 (5–9)	United Supermarkets Arena (4,077); Lubbock, TX
March 4, 2021; 6:00 p.m., ESPN+		at No. 6 West Virginia	L 67–76	12–12 (5–10)	WVU Coliseum (2,800); Morgantown, WV
March 7, 2021; 6:00 p.m., ESPN+		No. 15 Texas	L 64–76	12–13 (5–11)	Schollmaier Arena (2,229); Fort Worth, TX
Big 12 tournament
March 11, 2021; 5:30 p.m., ESPN	(8)	vs. (9) Kansas State; First round	L 50–71	12–14	T-Mobile Center (0); Kansas City, MO
*Non-conference game. ^{#}Rankings from AP Poll. (#) Tournament seedings in parentheses. All times are in Central Time.
