= 2020–21 West Virginia Mountaineers men's basketball team =

American college basketball season

2020–21 West Virginia Mountaineers men's basketball

Crossover Classic champions

NCAA tournament, second round
- Conference: Big 12 Conference

Ranking
- Coaches: No. 18
- AP: No. 13
- Record: 19–10 (11–6 Big 12)
- Head coach: Bob Huggins (14th season)
- Assistant coaches: Larry Harrison; Ron Everhart; Erik Martin
- Home arena: WVU Coliseum

2020–21 Big 12 men's basketball standings
	Conf.				Overall
Team	W		L	PCT	W		L	PCT
No. 1 Baylor	13	–	1	.929	28	–	2	.933
No. 16 Kansas	12	–	6	.667	21	–	9	.700
No. 21 Texas †	11	–	6	.647	19	–	8	.704
No. 18 West Virginia	11	–	6	.647	19	–	10	.655
No. 19 Oklahoma State	11	–	7	.611	21	–	9	.700
No. 22 Texas Tech	9	–	8	.529	18	–	11	.621
Oklahoma	9	–	8	.529	16	–	11	.593
TCU	5	–	11	.313	12	–	14	.462
Kansas State	4	–	14	.222	9	–	20	.310
Iowa State	0	–	18	.000	2	–	22	.083
† 2021 Big 12 Tournament winner Rankings from AP poll

The 2020–21 West Virginia Mountaineers men's basketball team represented West Virginia University during the 2020–21 NCAA Division I men's basketball season. The Mountaineers were coached by Bob Huggins, in his 14th season as WVU's head coach, and played their home games at the WVU Coliseum in Morgantown, West Virginia as members of the Big 12 Conference. They finished the season 19–10, 11–6 in Big 12 Play to finish in 4th place. They lost in the quarterfinals of the Big 12 tournament to Oklahoma State. They received an at-large bid to the NCAA tournament where they defeated Morehead State in the First Round before losing in the Second Round to Syracuse.

== Previous season ==
The Mountaineers finished 2019–20 season 21–10, 9–9 in Big 12 play to finish tied for third place in the conference. The Mountaineers were to play in the Big 12 Tournament, but it was canceled due to the COVID-19 Pandemic.

== Offseason ==
=== Departures ===
Name	Pos.	Number	Height	Weight	Previous School	Hometown	Reason for Leaving
Brandon Knapper	G	2	6 ft 0 in (1.83 m)	180 lb (82 kg)	Hargrave Military Academy	South Charleston, WV	Transferred to Eastern Kentucky
Logan Routt	F	31	6 ft 11 in (2.11 m)	260 lb (118 kg)	Cameron HS	Cameron, WV	Graduated
Chase Harler	G	14	6 ft 3 in (1.91 m)	210 lb (95 kg)	Wheeling Central HS	Moundsville, WV	Graduated
Jermaine Haley	G	10	6 ft 7 in (2.01 m)	215 lb (98 kg)	Odessa College	Vancouver, BC	Graduated

=== Recruits ===
==== Recruiting class of 2020 ====
College recruiting information
Name	Hometown	School	Height	Weight	Commit date
Isaiah Cottrell; PF	Las Vegas, NV	Huntington Prep School	6 ft 10 in (2.08 m)	240 lb (110 kg)	Jun 13, 2019
Isaiah Cottrell; PF	Recruit ratings: Rivals: 247Sports: ESPN:				
Taj Thweatt; SF	Wildwood, NJ	Wildwood Catholic Academy	6 ft 7 in (2.01 m)	210 lb (95 kg)	Sep 3, 2019
Taj Thweatt; SF	Recruit ratings: Rivals: 247Sports: ESPN:				
Seny Ndiaye; PF	Dakar, Senegal	Huntington Prep School	6 ft 10 in (2.08 m)	235 lb (107 kg)	Jul 15, 2020
Seny Ndiaye; PF	Recruit ratings: No ratings found				
Overall recruit ranking:
Note: In many cases, Scout, Rivals, 247Sports, On3, and ESPN may conflict in their listings of height and weight.; In these cases, the average was taken. ESPN grades are on a 100-point scale.; Sources: "2020 Team Ranking". Rivals.

=== Incoming transfers ===
Name	Number	Pos.	Height	Weight	Year	Hometown	Previous School
Kedrian Johnson	0	G	6'3"	180	Junior	Dallas, TX	Junior college transferred from Temple College.

== Roster ==
2020–21 West Virginia Mountaineers men's basketball team
Players
Coaches

Pos.	#	Name	Height	Weight	Year	Previous school	Hometown
G	0	Kedrian Johnson	6 ft 3 in (1.91 m)	180 lb (82 kg)	Jr	Temple College	Dallas, TX
F	1	Derek Culver	6 ft 10 in (2.08 m)	255 lb (116 kg)	Jr	Warren G. Harding HS	Youngstown, OH
F	2	Jalen Bridges	6 ft 7 in (2.01 m)	220 lb (100 kg)	RS Fr	Fairmont Senior HS	Fairmont, WV
F	3	Gabe Osabuohien	6 ft 7 in (2.01 m)	235 lb (107 kg)	Sr	Arkansas	Toronto, ON
G	4	Miles McBride	6 ft 2 in (1.88 m)	200 lb (91 kg)	So	Moeller HS	Cincinnati, OH
G	5	Jordan McCabe	6 ft 0 in (1.83 m)	188 lb (85 kg)	Jr	Kaukauna HS	Kaukauna, WI
F	11	Emmitt Matthews Jr.	6 ft 7 in (2.01 m)	215 lb (98 kg)	Jr	Woodrow Wilson HS	Tacoma, WA
G	12	Taz Sherman	6 ft 4 in (1.93 m)	190 lb (86 kg)	Sr	Collin College	Missouri City, TX
F	13	Isaiah Cottrell	6 ft 10 in (2.08 m)	240 lb (109 kg)	Fr	Huntington Prep	Las Vegas, NV
G	20	Jay Moore (W)	6 ft 3 in (1.91 m)	195 lb (88 kg)	Fr	Greater Beckley Christian	Beckley, WV
G	22	Sean McNeil	6 ft 3 in (1.91 m)	210 lb (95 kg)	Jr	Sinclair CC	Union, KY
F	23	Seny Ndiaye	6 ft 10 in (2.08 m)	235 lb (107 kg)	Fr	Huntington Prep	Dakar, Senegal
F	24	Taj Thweatt	6 ft 7 in (2.01 m)	210 lb (95 kg)	Fr	Wildwood Catholic	Wildwood, NJ
G	30	Spencer Macke (W)	5 ft 11 in (1.8 m)	175 lb (79 kg)	So	Silver Grove HS	Fort Thomas, KY

Head coach

- Bob Huggins (West Virginia)

Assistant coach(es)

- Larry Harrison (Pittsburgh)
- Ron Everhart (Virginia Tech)
- Erik Martin (Cincinnati)

Legend

- (C) Team captain
- (S) Suspended
- (I) Ineligible
- (W) Walk-on
- Injured
- Current redshirt

Roster

== Schedule ==
Date time, TV	Rank^{#}	Opponent^{#}	Result	Record	High points	High rebounds	High assists	Site (attendance) city, state
Regular season
November 25, 2020*; 9:30 pm, ESPN	No. 15	vs. South Dakota State; Crossover Classic quarterfinals	W 79–71	1–0	23 – McBride	14 – Culver	3 – McBride	Sanford Pentagon (0); Sioux Falls, SD
November 26, 2020*; 2:30 pm, ESPN	No. 15	vs. VCU; Crossover Classic semifinals	W 78–66	2–0	23 – Culver	16 – Tshiebwe	5 – McCabe	Sanford Pentagon (0); Sioux Falls, SD
November 27, 2020*; 7:00 pm, ESPN	No. 15	vs. Western Kentucky; Crossover Classic final	W 70–64	3–0	15 – Culver	8 – Osabuohien	5 – Osabuohien	Sanford Pentagon (0); Sioux Falls, SD
December 2, 2020*; 7:00 pm, ESPN	No. 11	vs. No. 1 Gonzaga; Jimmy V Classic	L 82–87	3–1	18 – Culver	15 – Culver	5 – McBride	Bankers Life Fieldhouse (0); Indianapolis, IN
December 6, 2020*; 4:30 pm, FS1	No. 11	at Georgetown; Big 12/Big East Battle	W 80–71	4–1	17 – McBride	9 – Culver	7 – McBride	McDonough Gymnasium (0); Washington, DC
December 9, 2020*; 7:00 pm, ESPN+	No. 11	Robert Morris	Canceled due to COVID-19 issues					WVU Coliseum; Morgantown, WV
December 11, 2020*; 3:00 pm, ESPN+	No. 11	North Texas	W 62–50	5–1	15 – McNeil	10 – Culver	5 – McBride	WVU Coliseum (291); Morgantown, WV
December 13, 2020*; 1:00 pm, ESPN	No. 11	No. 19 Richmond	W 87–71	6–1	20 – McBride	11 – Culver	5 – McBride	WVU Coliseum (371); Morgantown, WV
December 18, 2020; 9:00 pm, ESPNU	No. 8	Iowa State	W 70–65	7–1 (1–0)	18 – tied	12 – Culver	4 – Osabuohien	WVU Coliseum (0); Morgantown, WV
December 22, 2020; 9:00 pm, ESPN2	No. 7	at No. 3 Kansas	L 65–79	7–2 (1–1)	24 – McNeil	8 – Culver	5 – Osabuohien	Allen Fieldhouse (2,500); Lawrence, KS
December 29, 2020*; 2:00 pm, ESPN+	No. 9	Northeastern	W 73–51	8–2	18 – Culver	15 – Tshiebwe	5 – McBride	WVU Coliseum (311); Morgantown, WV
January 2, 2021; 4:00 pm, ESPN2	No. 9	at Oklahoma	L 71–75	8–3 (1–2)	19 – tied	6 – Culver	4 – McBride	Lloyd Noble Center (2,431); Norman, OK
January 4, 2021; 9:00 pm, ESPNU	No. 9	at Oklahoma State	W 87–84	9–3 (2–2)	22 – Culver	19 – Culver	5 – tied	Gallagher-Iba Arena (3,350); Stillwater, OK
January 9, 2021; 1:00 pm, ESPNU	No. 14	No. 4 Texas	L 70–72	9–4 (2–3)	17 – Sherman	16 – Culver	2 – tied	WVU Coliseum (305); Morgantown, WV
January 16, 2021; 1:00 pm	No. 14	TCU	Postponed due to COVID-19 issues					WVU Coliseum; Morgantown, WV
January 19, 2021; TBD	No. 14	Oklahoma State	Postponed due to COVID-19 issues					WVU Coliseum; Morgantown, WV
January 23, 2021; 4:00 pm, ESPN2	No. 14	at Kansas State	W 69–47	10–4 (3–3)	18 – McBride	5 – Osabuohien	5 – tied	Bramlage Coliseum (931); Manhattan, KS
January 25, 2021; 9:00 pm, ESPN	No. 11	No. 10 Texas Tech	W 88–87	11–4 (4–3)	24 – McBride	9 – Culver	6 – McBride	WVU Coliseum (339); Morgantown, WV
January 30, 2021*; 2:00 pm, ESPN	No. 11	Florida	L 80–85	11–5	28 – Culver	12 – Culver	9 – McBride	WVU Coliseum (1,000); Morgantown, WV
February 2, 2021; 7:00 pm, ESPN+	No. 17	at Iowa State	W 76–72	12–5 (5–3)	18 – Sherman	12 – Culver	5 – McCabe	Hilton Coliseum (1,059); Ames, IA
February 6, 2021; 2:00 pm, CBS	No. 17	No. 23 Kansas	W 91–79	13–5 (6–3)	29 – McBride	9 – Culver	8 – McBride	WVU Coliseum (1,500); Morgantown, WV
February 9, 2021; 9:00 pm, ESPN	No. 14	at No. 7 Texas Tech	W 82–71	14–5 (7–3)	26 – McNeil	8 – Culver	4 – McBride	United Supermarkets Arena (4,500); Lubbock, TX
February 13, 2021; 1:00 pm, ESPN+	No. 14	No. 12 Oklahoma	L 90–91 ^{2OT}	14–6 (7–4)	29 – Culver	14 – Culver	8 – McBride	WVU Coliseum (2,800); Morgantown, WV
February 15, 2021; 9:00 pm, ESPN	No. 13	No. 2 Baylor	Postponed due to COVID-19 issues					WVU Coliseum; Morgantown, WV
February 18, 2021; 5:00 pm, ESPN2	No. 13	at No. 2 Baylor	Postponed due to COVID-19 issues					Ferrell Center; Waco, TX
February 20, 2021; 3:00 p.m., ABC	No. 13	at No. 12 Texas	W 84–82	15–6 (8–4)	17 – McBride	7 – Matthews Jr.	4 – McBride	Frank Erwin Center (0); Austin, TX
February 23, 2021; 7:00 pm, ESPN2	No. 10	at TCU	W 74–66	16–6 (9–4)	23 – Sherman	14 – Culver	5 – McBride	Schollmaier Arena (1,877); Fort Worth, TX
February 25, 2021; 4:00 pm, ESPN2	No. 10	at No. 2 Baylor	Canceled due to scheduling changes					Ferrell Center; Waco, TX
February 27, 2021; 4:00 pm, ESPN2	No. 10	Kansas State	W 65–43	17–6 (10–4)	16 – McNeil	7 – Osabuohien	3 – Tied	WVU Coliseum (2,800); Morgantown, WV
March 2, 2021; 5:00 pm, ESPN	No. 6	No. 3 Baylor	L 89–94 ^{OT}	17–7 (10–5)	26 – Sherman	9 – Culver	8 – McBride	WVU Coliseum (2,800); Morgantown, WV
March 4, 2021; 7:00 pm, ESPN+	No. 6	TCU	W 76–67	18–7 (11–5)	22 – Bridges	12 – Bridges	5 – McBride	WVU Coliseum (2,800); Morgantown, WV
March 6, 2021; 2:00 pm, ESPN2	No. 6	No. 17 Oklahoma State	L 80–85	18–8 (11–6)	20 – Sherman	6 – Bridges	4 – McBride	WVU Coliseum (2,800); Morgantown, WV
Big 12 Tournament
March 11, 2021; 11:30 am, ESPN	(4) No. 10	vs. (5) No. 12 Oklahoma State; Quarterfinals	L 69–72	18–9	19 – Tied	9 – Culver	6 – McBride	T-Mobile Center (3,491); Kansas City, MO
NCAA tournament
March 19, 2021*; 9:50 pm, truTV	(3 MW) No. 13	vs. (14 MW) Morehead State; First Round	W 84–67	19–9	30 – McBride	7 – Culver	6 – McBride	Lucas Oil Stadium; Indianapolis, IN
March 21, 2021*; 5:15 pm, CBS	(3 MW) No. 13	vs. (11 MW) Syracuse; Second Round	L 72–75	19–10	23 – McNeil	9 – Bridges	7 – McBride	Bankers Life Fieldhouse; Indianapolis, IN
*Non-conference game. ^{#}Rankings from AP Poll. (#) Tournament seedings in parentheses. All times are in Eastern Time.

== Rankings ==
Ranking movements Legend: ██ Increase in ranking ██ Decrease in ranking т = Tied with team above or below
	Week																	
Poll	Pre	1	2	3	4	5	6	7	8	9	10	11	12	13	14	15	16	Final
AP	15	11	11	11	8	7	9	14	14	11	17	14	13	10	6	10	13	Not released
Coaches	15	15^	10	7	6	8	16	14	15	11	18	14	15	13	5т	9	13	18

*AP does not release post-NCAA Tournament rankings.
^Coaches did not release a Week 1 poll.
