= Matt Coleman III =

American basketball player (born 1998)

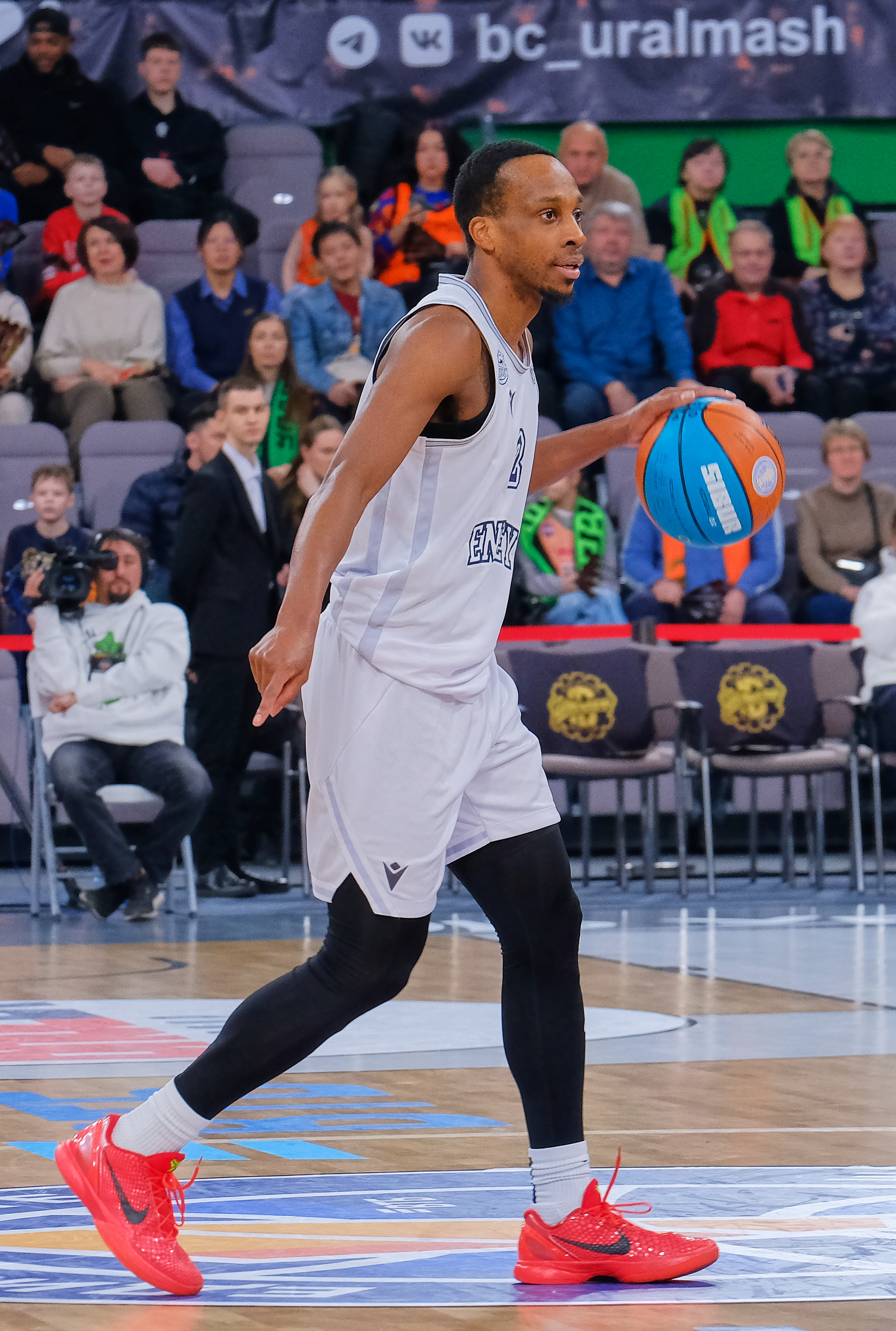
- Coleman with Enisey in 2026

No. 2 – Spartak Subotica
- Position: Point guard
- League: Serbian SuperLeague; ABA League; FIBA Champions League

Personal information
- Born: January 22, 1998 (age 28) Norfolk, Virginia, U.S.
- Listed height: 6 ft 2 in (1.88 m)
- Listed weight: 180 lb (82 kg)

Career information
- High school: Matthew Fontaine Maury (Norfolk, Virginia); Oak Hill Academy (Mouth of Wilson, Virginia)
- College: Texas (2017–2021)
- NBA draft: 2021: undrafted
- Playing career: 2021–present

Career history
- 2021–2022: Stockton Kings
- 2022: Beşiktaş
- 2022–2023: Konyaspor
- 2023: Peristeri Athens
- 2023: Ottawa BlackJacks
- 2023–2024: Dziki Warszawa
- 2024–2025: Hapoel Haifa
- 2025–2026: Enisey
- 2026–present: Spartak Subotica

Career highlights
- NIT champion (2019); 2× Third-team All-Big 12 (2020, 2021); Big 12 tournament MOP (2021)
- Stats at NBA.com
- Stats at Basketball Reference
Medals
Men's basketball
Representing the United States
FIBA Americas U18 Championship
Gold medal – first place	2016 Chile	Team

Clifford Matthew Coleman III (born January 22, 1998) is an American professional basketball player for Spartak Subotica of the Serbian SuperLeague, the ABA League, and the FIBA Champions League. He played college basketball for the Texas Longhorns.

== High school career ==
Coleman played basketball for Matthew Fontaine Maury High School in Norfolk, Virginia for two years. After his sophomore season, he transferred to Oak Hill Academy in Mouth of Wilson, Virginia. As a junior, Coleman helped his team win the High School National title. He averaged 11.3 points, 7.5 assists, 4.5 rebounds and 2.6 steals per game as a senior, helping Oak Hill finish with a 38–4 record. He was named Virginia Gatorade Player of the Year. Coleman played in the Jordan Brand Classic and finished with eight points, eights assists and three steals. He was a four-star recruit and committed to playing college basketball for Texas over an offer from Duke, among others. Coleman was drawn by his relationship with coach Shaka Smart.

== College career ==
On January 10, 2018, Coleman registered his first career double-double with 17 points and 12 assists in a 99–98 win over TCU. On March 16, he recorded a career-high 25 points and four assists in an 87–83 overtime loss to seventh-seeded Nevada in the first round of the 2018 NCAA tournament. In his freshman season, he averaged 10.2 points per game, 4.1 assists and 2.5 rebounds per game, earning All-Big 12 Honorable Mention. Coleman averaged 9.8 points and 3.4 assists per game as a sophomore, while shooting 38.7 percent from the floor. For a second time, he was selected to the All-Big 12 Honorable Mention. On November 9, 2019, Coleman posted 22 points and seven assists in a 70–66 victory over Purdue. As a junior, he averaged 12.7 points, 3.4 assists and three rebounds per game. He was named to the Third Team All-Big 12.

Coming into his senior season, Coleman was named to the Preseason All-Big 12 Team. On December 2, 2020, Coleman scored 22 points and hit the game-winning jump shot with 0.1 seconds remaining in a 69–67 win against North Carolina in the Maui Invitational championship. On March 13, 2021, he scored 30 points in a 91–86 win over Oklahoma State at the Big 12 tournament final. He was named tournament most outstanding player.

== Professional career ==
After going undrafted in the 2021 NBA draft, Coleman joined the Sacramento Kings for the 2021 NBA Summer League. On September 28, 2021, he signed a contract with the Kings. He was waived prior to the start of the season. He was later picked up by Sacramento's G League affiliate, the Stockton Kings as an affiliate player.

On July 22, 2022, he signed with Beşiktaş of the Basketbol Süper Ligi (BSL).

On December 9, 2022, he signed with AYOS Konyaspor of the Turkish Basketbol Süper Ligi (BSL).

On February 8, 2023, Coleman signed with Peristeri Athens of the Greek Basket League for the rest of the season. In 17 domestic Greek league games, he averaged 3.4 points and 1.4 rebounds, while playing around 12 minutes per contest. On June 25, 2023, he parted ways with the Greek club.

In June of the same year, Coleman moved to the Ottawa BlackJacks of the Canadian Elite Basketball League.

On July 13, 2023, Coleman signed with Dziki Warszawa of the Polish Basketball League.

On July 17, 2025, Coleman signed a contract with the Russian club Enisey of the VTB United League.

== National team career ==
Coleman represented the United States at the 2016 FIBA Americas Under-18 Championship. He averaged 7.8 points, 4.6 rebounds and 4.4 assists in 22.8 minutes per game, helping his team win the gold medal.

== Career statistics ==
Legend
GP	Games played	GS	Games started	MPG	Minutes per game
FG%	Field goal percentage	3P%	3-point field goal percentage	FT%	Free throw percentage
RPG	Rebounds per game	APG	Assists per game	SPG	Steals per game
BPG	Blocks per game	PPG	Points per game	**Bold**	Career high

=== College ===
Year	Team	GP	GS	MPG	FG%	3P%	FT%	RPG	APG	SPG	BPG	PPG
2017–18	Texas	34	34	34.0	.411	.286	.787	2.5	**4.1**	1.2	.0	10.2
2018–19	Texas	**37**	**37**	30.7	.388	.326	.785	2.1	3.4	.8	**.1**	9.8
2019–20	Texas	30	30	33.6	.441	**.395**	.797	3.0	3.4	**1.3**	**.1**	12.7
2020–21	Texas	27	27	**34.4**	**.485**	.377	**.813**	**3.5**	4.0	1.2	**.1**	**13.2**
Career		128	128	33.1	.429	.347	.795	2.7	3.7	1.1	.1	11.3

== Personal life ==
Coleman's younger brother, Chase, plays college basketball for Virginia, playing as a walk-on in his freshman season.
