= 2019–20 Oklahoma State Cowboys basketball team =

American college basketball season

2019–20 Oklahoma State Cowboys basketball

NIT Season Tip-Off champions
- Conference: Big 12 Conference
- Record: 18–14 (7–11 Big 12)
- Head coach: Mike Boynton Jr. (3rd season)
- Assistant coaches: Scott Sutton; Erik Pastrana; Cannen Cunningham
- Home arena: Gallagher-Iba Arena

2019–20 Big 12 men's basketball standings
	Conf.				Overall
Team	W		L	PCT	W		L	PCT
No. 1 Kansas	17	–	1	.944	28	–	3	.903
No. 5 Baylor	15	–	3	.833	26	–	4	.867
No. 24 West Virginia	9	–	9	.500	21	–	10	.677
Texas	9	–	9	.500	19	–	12	.613
Oklahoma	9	–	9	.500	19	–	12	.613
Texas Tech	9	–	9	.500	18	–	13	.581
TCU	7	–	11	.389	16	–	16	.500
Oklahoma State	7	–	11	.389	18	–	14	.563
Iowa State	5	–	13	.278	12	–	20	.375
Kansas State	3	–	15	.167	11	–	21	.344
Note: The 2020 Big 12 Tournament was canceled prior to the quarterfinals due to the COVID-19 pandemic. Rankings from AP poll

The 2019–20 Oklahoma State Cowboys basketball team represented Oklahoma State University in the 2019–20 NCAA Division I men's basketball season. They were led by third-head coach Mike Boynton Jr. The Cowboys were members of the Big 12 Conference and played their home games at Gallagher-Iba Arena in Stillwater, Oklahoma.

== Previous season ==
The Cowboys finished the 2018–19 season with 12–20, 5–13 in Big 12 play to finish in ninth place. The Cowboys suffered significant roster attrition and finished the season with only 7 scholarship players, their season ending with first-round loss in the Big 12 men's basketball tournament to TCU. Graduate transfer Mike Cunningham left the program, and then three players were subsequently dismissed from the team for their connection with in an automobile vandalism incident.

== Departures ==
Name	Number	Pos.	Height	Weight	Year	Hometown	Reason for departure
Kentrevious Jones	00	C	6'10"	270	Freshman	Macon, GA	Dismissed from team
Curtis Jones	1	G	6'4"	185	RS Junior	Antioch, VA	Graduate transfer to Penn State
Maurice Calloo	2	F	6'9"	225	Freshman	Windsor, ON	Dismissed from team
Duncan Demuth	5	F	6'8"	210	Freshman	Seminole, FL	Transferred
Mike Cunningham	55	G	6'1"	180	Senior	Miami, FL	Left team

=== Incoming transfers ===
Name	Number	Pos.	Height	Weight	Year	Hometown	Previous school
Jonathan Laurent	1	F	6'6"		Senior	Orlando, FL	Massachusetts

== Recruits ==
College recruiting information
Name	Hometown	School	Height	Weight	Commit date
Avery Anderson III #19 CG	Justin, Texas	Northwest	6 ft 2 in (1.88 m)	170 lb (77 kg)	Sep 18, 2018
Avery Anderson III #19 CG	Recruit ratings: Rivals: 247Sports:				
Chris Harris Jr. #23 SG	Garland, TX	South Garland High School	6 ft 3 in (1.91 m)	195 lb (88 kg)	Apr 18, 2019
Chris Harris Jr. #23 SG	Recruit ratings: Rivals: 247Sports:				
Marcus Watson #14 SG	Buford, Georgia	Buford High School	6 ft 6 in (1.98 m)	205 lb (93 kg)	Oct 21, 2018
Marcus Watson #14 SG	Recruit ratings: Rivals: 247Sports:				
Keylan Boone #74 PF	Tulsa, Oklahoma	Tulsa Memorial High School	6 ft 8 in (2.03 m)	175 lb (79 kg)	Sep 10, 2017
Keylan Boone #74 PF	Recruit ratings: Rivals: 247Sports: (NR)				
Kalib Boone #25 C	Tulsa, OK	Memorial High School	6 ft 8 in (2.03 m)	190 lb (86 kg)	Apr 16, 2018
Kalib Boone #25 C	Recruit ratings: Rivals: 247Sports:				
Hidde Roessink; PF	Arnhem, Netherlands	Den Bosch Academy	6 ft 10 in (2.08 m)	220 lb (100 kg)	Jun 26, 2019
Hidde Roessink; PF	Recruit ratings: Rivals: 247Sports:				
Overall recruit ranking:
Note: In many cases, Scout, Rivals, 247Sports, On3, and ESPN may conflict in their listings of height and weight.; In these cases, the average was taken. ESPN grades are on a 100-point scale.; Sources: "2019 Team Ranking". Rivals.

== Future recruits ==
=== 2020–21 team recruits ===
College recruiting information
Name	Hometown	School	Height	Weight	Commit date
Rondel Walker; SG	Oklahoma City, Oklahoma	Putnam City West HS	6 ft 2 in (1.88 m)	160 lb (73 kg)	Oct 31, 2019
Rondel Walker; SG	Recruit ratings: Rivals: 247Sports:				
Cade Cunningham; PG	Arlington, TX	Montverde Academy	6 ft 6 in (1.98 m)	215 lb (98 kg)	Nov 5, 2019
Cade Cunningham; PG	Recruit ratings: Rivals: 247Sports:				
Montreal Pena; PF	Arlington, TX	Martin High School	6 ft 9 in (2.06 m)	200 lb (91 kg)	Nov 20, 2019
Montreal Pena; PF	Recruit ratings: Rivals: 247Sports:				
Overall recruit ranking:
Note: In many cases, Scout, Rivals, 247Sports, On3, and ESPN may conflict in their listings of height and weight.; In these cases, the average was taken. ESPN grades are on a 100-point scale.; Sources:

== Roster ==
2019–20 Oklahoma State Cowboys men's basketball team
Players
Coaches

Pos.	#	Name	Height	Weight	Year	Previous school	Hometown
G	0	Avery Anderson III	6 ft 2 in (1.88 m)	170 lb (77 kg)	Fr	Northwest HS	Justin, TX
G/F	1	Jonathan Laurent	6 ft 6 in (1.98 m)	215 lb (98 kg)	Sr	UMass	Orlando, FL
G	2	Chris Harris Jr.	6 ft 3 in (1.91 m)	200 lb (91 kg)	Fr	South Garland HS	Dallas, TX
G	4	Thomas Dziagwa	6 ft 4 in (1.93 m)	190 lb (86 kg)	Sr	Tampa Catholic HS	Temple Terrace, FL
G	5	Marcus Watson (S)	6 ft 6 in (1.98 m)	215 lb (98 kg)	Fr	Buford HS	Buford, GA
F	12	Cameron McGriff	6 ft 7 in (2.01 m)	230 lb (104 kg)	Sr	South Grand Prairie HS	Grand Prairie, TX
G	13	Isaac Likekele	6 ft 4 in (1.93 m)	215 lb (98 kg)	So	Mansfield Timberview HS	Arlington, TX
F	14	Yor Anei	6 ft 10 in (2.08 m)	235 lb (107 kg)	So	Lee's Summit HS	Overland Park, KS
G/F	20	Keylan Boone	6 ft 8 in (2.03 m)	200 lb (91 kg)	Fr	Tulsa Memorial HS	Tulsa, OK
G	21	Lindy Waters III	6 ft 6 in (1.98 m)	215 lb (98 kg)	Sr	Norman North HS	Norman, OK
F	22	Kalib Boone	6 ft 9 in (2.06 m)	205 lb (93 kg)	Fr	Tulsa Memorial HS	Tulsa, OK
G	31	Dee Mitchell (W)	6 ft 2 in (1.88 m)	190 lb (86 kg)	So	Jefferson	Jefferson, TX
F	33	Trey Reeves	6 ft 4 in (1.93 m)	220 lb (100 kg)	Sr	Muldrow	Gans, OK
F	35	Hidde Roessink	6 ft 10 in (2.08 m)	220 lb (100 kg)	Fr	Den Bosch Academy	Arnhem, Netherlands
G	54	J. K. Hadlock (W)	6 ft 1 in (1.85 m)	185 lb (84 kg)	Sr	Glencoe HS	Fairfax, OK

Head coach

- Mike Boynton, Jr. (South Carolina)

Assistant coach(es)

- Scott Sutton (Oklahoma State)
- Erik Pastrana (Florida State)
- Cannen Cunningham (SMU)

Legend

- (C) Team captain
- (S) Suspended
- (I) Ineligible
- (W) Walk-on
- Injured
- Current redshirt

Roster

== Schedule and results ==
Date time, TV	Rank^{#}	Opponent^{#}	Result	Record	Site (attendance) city, state
Exhibition
Nov 1, 2019*; 7:00 pm		Rogers State	W 75–63		Gallagher-Iba Arena (5,840); Stillwater, OK
Regular season
Nov 6, 2019*; 7:00 pm, ESPN+		Oral Roberts	W 80–75	1–0	Gallagher-Iba Arena (7,319); Stillwater, OK
Nov 9, 2019*; 2:00 pm, ESPN+		Kansas City	W 69–51	2–0	Gallagher-Iba Arena (6,239); Stillwater, OK
Nov 13, 2019*; 8:00 pm, CBSSN		at Charleston	W 73–54	3–0	TD Arena (5,005); Charleston, SC
Nov 17, 2019*; 1:00 pm, ESPN+		Yale; NIT Season Tip-Off campus site game	W 64–57	4–0	Gallagher-Iba Arena (7,260); Stillwater, OK
Nov 22, 2019*; 7:00 pm, ESPN+		Western Michigan; NIT Season Tip-Off campus site game	W 70–63	5–0	Gallagher-Iba Arena (6,097); Stillwater, OK
Nov 27, 2019*; 6:30 pm, ESPN2		vs. Syracuse; NIT Season Tip-Off semifinals	W 86–72	6–0	Barclays Center (4,114); Brooklyn, NY
Nov 29, 2019*; 8:30 pm, ESPN2		vs. Ole Miss; NIT Season Tip-Off championship	W 78–37	7–0	Barclays Center (4,159); Brooklyn, NY
Dec 4, 2019*; 7:00 pm, ESPN+		Georgetown; Big East/Big 12 Battle	L 74–81	7–1	Gallagher-Iba Arena (9,188); Stillwater, OK
Dec 8, 2019*; 1:00 pm, ESPNU		Wichita State	L 61–80	7–2	Gallagher-Iba Arena (7,945); Stillwater, OK
Dec 15, 2019*; 2:00 pm, ESPN		at Houston	W 61–55	8–2	Fertitta Center (7,035); Houston, TX
Dec 21, 2019*; 4:30 pm, ESPN2		vs. Minnesota	L 66–86	8–3	BOK Center (4,979); Tulsa, OK
Dec 29, 2019*; 1:30 pm, ESPN+		Southeastern Louisiana	W 82–31	9–3	Gallagher-Iba Arena (7,722); Stillwater, OK
Jan 4, 2020; 11:00 am, ESPN2		at No. 22 Texas Tech	L 50–85	9–4 (0–1)	United Supermarkets Arena (14,325); Lubbock, TX
Jan 6, 2020; 8:00 pm, ESPN2		No. 17 West Virginia	L 41–55	9–5 (0–2)	Gallagher-Iba Arena (6,764); Stillwater, OK
Jan 11, 2020; 1:00 pm, ESPN2		at TCU	L 40–52	9–6 (0–3)	Schollmaier Arena (6,001); Fort Worth, TX
Jan 15, 2020; 7:00 pm, ESPN+		Texas	L 64–76	9–7 (0–4)	Gallagher-Iba Arena (7,403); Stillwater, OK
Jan 18, 2020; 11:00 am, ESPN2		No. 2 Baylor	L 68–75	9–8 (0–5)	Gallagher-Iba Arena (7,403); Stillwater, OK
Jan 21, 2020; 7:00 pm, ESPN+		at Iowa State	L 82–89	9–9 (0–6)	Hilton Coliseum (13,916); Ames, IA
Jan 25, 2020*; 3:00 pm, ESPNU		at Texas A&M; Big 12/SEC Challenge	W 73–62	10–9	Reed Arena (7,622); College Station, TX
Jan 27, 2020; 8:00 pm, ESPN2		No. 3 Kansas	L 50–65	10–10 (0–7)	Gallagher-Iba Arena (8,818); Stillwater, OK
Feb 1, 2020; 2:00 pm, ABC		at Oklahoma; Bedlam	L 69–82	10–11 (0–8)	Lloyd Noble Center (10,186); Norman, OK
Feb 5, 2019; 7:00 pm, ESPN+		TCU	W 72–57	11–11 (1–8)	Gallagher-Iba Arena (5,605); Stillwater, OK
Feb 8, 2020; 5:00 pm, ESPN2		at No. 1 Baylor	L 70–78	11–12 (1–9)	Ferrell Center (7,675); Waco, TX
Feb 11, 2020; 8:00 pm, ESPNU		at Kansas State	W 64–59	12–12 (2–9)	Bramlage Coliseum (7,967); Manhattan, KS
Feb 15, 2020; 12:00 pm, CBS		No. 24 Texas Tech	W 73–70	13–12 (3–9)	Gallagher-Iba Arena (8,424); Stillwater, OK
Feb 18, 2020; 6:00 pm, ESPN2		at No. 17 West Virginia	L 47–65	13–13 (3–10)	WVU Coliseum (12,053); Morgantown, WV
Feb 22, 2020; 3:00 pm, ESPN2		Oklahoma; Bedlam	W 83–66	14–13 (4–10)	Gallagher-Iba Arena (10,252); Stillwater, OK
Feb 24, 2020; 8:00 pm, ESPN		at No. 1 Kansas	L 58–83	14–14 (4–11)	Allen Fieldhouse (16,300); Lawrence, KS
Feb 29, 2020; 3:00 pm, ESPNU		Iowa State	W 73–61	15–14 (5–11)	Gallagher-Iba Arena (8,129); Stillwater, OK
Mar 4, 2020; 8:00 pm, ESPNU		Kansas State	W 69–63	16–14 (6–11)	Gallagher-Iba Arena (6,983); Stillwater, OK
Mar 7, 2020; 3:00 pm, ESPN2		at Texas	W 81–59	17–14 (7–11)	Frank Erwin Center (12,733); Austin, TX
Big 12 tournament
Mar 11, 2020; 6:00 pm, ESPNU	(8)	vs. (9) Iowa State; First round	W 72–71	18–14	Sprint Center (17,606); Kansas City, MO
Mar 12, 2020; 1:30 pm, ESPN2	(8)	vs. (1) No. 1 Kansas; Quarterfinals	Canceled due to the COVID-19 pandemic		Sprint Center; Kansas City, MO
*Non-conference game. ^{#}Rankings from AP Poll. (#) Tournament seedings in parentheses. All times are in Central Time.

*The 2020 Big 12 Tournament was cancelled due to concerns over the COVID-19 pandemic.

== Rankings ==
Ranking movements Legend: ██ Increase in ranking ██ Decrease in ranking — = Not ranked RV = Received votes
	Week																				
Poll	Pre	1	2	3	4	5	6	7	8	9	10	11	12	13	14	15	16	17	18	19	Final
AP*	—	—	—	—	RV	—	RV	—	—	—	—	—	—	—	—	—	—	—			Not released
Coaches	RV	RV	RV	—	25	RV	RV	—	—	—	—	—	—	—	—	—	—	—			

*AP does not release post-NCAA Tournament rankings
