= 2019–20 West Virginia Mountaineers men's basketball team =

American college basketball season

2019–20 West Virginia Mountaineers men's basketball

Cancún Challenge Riviera Division champions
- Conference: Big 12 Conference

Ranking
- Coaches: No. 24
- AP: No. 24
- Record: 21–10 (9–9 Big 12)
- Head coach: Bob Huggins (13th season)
- Assistant coaches: Larry Harrison; Ron Everhart; Erik Martin
- Home arena: WVU Coliseum

2019–20 Big 12 men's basketball standings
	Conf.				Overall
Team	W		L	PCT	W		L	PCT
No. 1 Kansas	17	–	1	.944	28	–	3	.903
No. 5 Baylor	15	–	3	.833	26	–	4	.867
No. 24 West Virginia	9	–	9	.500	21	–	10	.677
Texas	9	–	9	.500	19	–	12	.613
Oklahoma	9	–	9	.500	19	–	12	.613
Texas Tech	9	–	9	.500	18	–	13	.581
TCU	7	–	11	.389	16	–	16	.500
Oklahoma State	7	–	11	.389	18	–	14	.563
Iowa State	5	–	13	.278	12	–	20	.375
Kansas State	3	–	15	.167	11	–	21	.344
Note: The 2020 Big 12 Tournament was canceled prior to the quarterfinals due to the COVID-19 pandemic. Rankings from AP poll

The 2019–20 West Virginia Mountaineers men's basketball team represented West Virginia University during the 2019–20 NCAA Division I men's basketball season. The Mountaineers were coached by Bob Huggins, in his 13th season as WVU's head coach, and played their home games at the WVU Coliseum in Morgantown, West Virginia as members of the Big 12 Conference. Preseason Big 12 polls picked the Mountaineers to finish 5th in the conference standings and Oscar Tshiebwe was picked as Big 12 Preseason Freshman of the Year. The Mountaineers season officially started on November 8, 2019.

== Previous season ==
The Mountaineers finished the 2018–19 season 15–21, 4–14 in Big 12 play to finish in last place in the conference. They defeated Oklahoma and Texas Tech to advance to the semifinal game of the Big 12 tournament where they lost to Kansas. They received an invitation to the 2019 College Basketball Invitational where they defeated Grand Canyon and advanced to the second round where they were defeated by Coastal Carolina.

== Offseason ==
=== Departures ===
Name	Number	Pos.	Height	Weight	Year	Hometown	Reason for departure
Trey Doomes	0	G	6'3"	175	Freshman	Acworth, GA	Transferred to Chattanooga
James Bolden	3	G	6'0"	188	RS Junior	Covington, KY	Graduate transferred to Alabama
Andrew Gordon	12	F	6'9"	255	RS Sophomore	Clearwater, FL	Transferred to Louisiana Tech
Lamont West	15	F	6'8"	222	RS Junior	Cincinnati, OH	Graduate transferred to Missouri State
Taevon Horton	20	G	6'1"	190	Freshman	Fairmont, WV	Walk-on; transferred to Missouri State–West Plains
Wesley Harris	21	F	6'8"	200	Junior	Jackson, MS	Dismissed from team (mid-season); graduate transferred to Tennessee State
Esa Ahmad	23	F	6'8"	225	Senior	Cleveland, OH	Dismissed from team (mid-season)
Sagaba Konate	50	F	6'8"	250	Junior	Bamako, Mali	Play professionally

== Recruits ==
=== Recruiting class of 2019 ===
College recruiting information
Name	Hometown	School	Height	Weight	Commit date
Miles McBride; PG	Cincinnati, OH	Moeller High School	6 ft 0 in (1.83 m)	175 lb (79 kg)	Feb 5, 2018
Miles McBride; PG	Recruit ratings: Scout: Rivals: 247Sports: ESPN:				
Oscar Tshiebwe; C	Lubumbashi, DR Congo	Kennedy Catholic High School	6 ft 8 in (2.03 m)	230 lb (100 kg)	Oct 20, 2018
Oscar Tshiebwe; C	Recruit ratings: Scout: Rivals: 247Sports: ESPN:				
Jalen Bridges; SF	Fairmont, WV	Fairmont Senior High School	6 ft 7 in (2.01 m)	180 lb (82 kg)	Sep 2, 2019
Jalen Bridges; SF	Recruit ratings: Scout: Rivals: 247Sports: ESPN:				
Overall recruit ranking:
Note: In many cases, Scout, Rivals, 247Sports, On3, and ESPN may conflict in their listings of height and weight.; In these cases, the average was taken. ESPN grades are on a 100-point scale.; Sources: "2019 Team Ranking". Rivals.

=== Incoming transfers ===
Name	Number	Pos.	Height	Weight	Year	Hometown	Previous School
Gabe Osabuohien	3	F	6'7"	235	Junior	Toronto, Ontario	Transferred from Arkansas. His waiver for immediate eligibility was approved as of November 20, 2019.
Taz Sherman	12	G	6'4"	185	Junior	Missouri City, TX	Junior college transferred from Collin College.
Sean McNeil	22	G	6'3"	207	Sophomore	Union, KY	Junior college transferred from Sinclair CC.

== Roster ==
2019–20 West Virginia Mountaineers men's basketball team
Players
Coaches

Pos.	#	Name	Height	Weight	Year	Previous school	Hometown
F	1	Derek Culver	6 ft 10 in (2.08 m)	255 lb (116 kg)	So	Warren G. Harding HS	Youngstown, OH
G	2	Brandon Knapper	6 ft 0 in (1.83 m)	185 lb (84 kg)	RS So	Hargrave Military Academy	South Charleston, WV
F	3	Gabe Osabuohien	6 ft 7 in (2.01 m)	235 lb (107 kg)	Jr	Arkansas	Toronto, ON
G	4	Miles McBride	6 ft 2 in (1.88 m)	196 lb (89 kg)	Fr	Moeller HS	Cincinnati, OH
G	5	Jordan McCabe	6 ft 0 in (1.83 m)	188 lb (85 kg)	So	Kaukauna HS	Kaukauna, WI
G	10	Jermaine Haley	6 ft 7 in (2.01 m)	215 lb (98 kg)	RS Sr	Odessa College	Vancouver, BC
F	11	Emmitt Matthews Jr.	6 ft 7 in (2.01 m)	210 lb (95 kg)	So	Woodrow Wilson HS	Tacoma, WA
G	12	Taz Sherman	6 ft 4 in (1.93 m)	185 lb (84 kg)	Jr	Collin College	Missouri City, TX
G	14	Chase Harler	6 ft 3 in (1.91 m)	210 lb (95 kg)	Sr	Wheeling Central HS	Moundsville, WV
F	15	Jalen Bridges (redshirt)	6 ft 7 in (2.01 m)	210 lb (95 kg)	Fr	Fairmont Senior HS	Fairmont, WV
G	22	Sean McNeil	6 ft 3 in (1.91 m)	207 lb (94 kg)	So	Sinclair CC	Union, KY
G	30	Spencer Macke (W)	5 ft 11 in (1.8 m)	170 lb (77 kg)	Fr	Silver Grove HS	Fort Thomas, KY
F	31	Logan Routt	6 ft 11 in (2.11 m)	250 lb (113 kg)	RS Sr	Cameron HS	Cameron, WV
F	34	Oscar Tshiebwe	6 ft 9 in (2.06 m)	258 lb (117 kg)	Fr	Kennedy Catholic HS	Lubumbashi, DR Congo

Head coach

- Bob Huggins (West Virginia)

Assistant coach(es)

- Larry Harrison (Pittsburgh)
- Ron Everhart (Virginia Tech)
- Erik Martin (Cincinnati)

Legend

- (C) Team captain
- (S) Suspended
- (I) Ineligible
- (W) Walk-on
- Injured
- Current redshirt

Roster

== Schedule and results ==
Date time, TV	Rank^{#}	Opponent^{#}	Result	Record	High points	High rebounds	High assists	Site (attendance) city, state
Exhibition
November 1, 2019*; 7:00 pm, ATTSNPT		Duquesne; Charity Exhibition	W 78–70	–	17 – Tshiebwe	14 – Tshiebwe	4 – McCabe	WVU Coliseum (9,705); Morgantown, WV
Regular season
November 8, 2019*; 7:00 pm, ATTSNPT		Akron	W 94–84	1–0	16 – Culver	7 – Culver	4 – McBride	WVU Coliseum (12,513); Morgantown, WV
November 15, 2019*; 7:00 pm, ESPNU		at Pittsburgh; Backyard Brawl	W 68–53	2–0	20 – Tshiebwe	17 – Tshiebwe	4 – McCabe	Petersen Events Center (11,725); Pittsburgh, PA
November 18, 2019*; 7:00 pm, ATTSNPT		Northern Colorado; Cancún Challenge campus-site game	W 69–61	3–0	18 – Haley	12 – Haley	4 – McCabe	WVU Coliseum (9,740); Morgantown, WV
November 22, 2019*; 7:00 pm, Nexstar		Boston University; Cancún Challenge campus-site game	W 69–44	4–0	21 – Tshiebwe	10 – Tshiebwe	4 – McCabe	WVU Coliseum (10,743); Morgantown, WV
November 26, 2019*; 8:30 pm, CBSSN		vs. Northern Iowa; Cancún Challenge semifinals	W 60–55	5–0	18 – McBride	15 – Culver	5 – McBride	Hard Rock Hotel Riviera Maya (1,478); Riviera Maya, Mexico
November 27, 2019*; 8:30 pm, CBSSN		vs. Wichita State; Cancún Challenge championship	W 75–63	6–0	19 – Tshiebwe	18 – Tshiebwe	4 – McBride	Hard Rock Hotel Riviera Maya (1,729); Riviera Maya, Mexico
December 1, 2019*; 2:00 pm, ATTSNPT		Rhode Island	W 86–81	7–0	25 – Culver	11 – Culver	4 – McBride	WVU Coliseum (10,973); Morgantown, WV
December 7, 2019*; 12:00 pm, FS1		at St. John's; MSG Holiday Festival; Big East/Big 12 Battle	L 68–70	7–1	13 – McNeil	18 – Culver	4 – Tied	Madison Square Garden (7,281); New York, NY
December 12, 2019*; 7:00 pm, Nexstar		Austin Peay	W 84–53	8–1	16 – Matthews	10 – Matthews	5 – Osabuohien	WVU Coliseum (9,987); Morgantown, WV
December 14, 2019*; 2:00 pm, ATTSNPT		Nicholls	W 83–57	9–1	16 – Culver	16 – Culver	5 – Osabuohien	WVU Coliseum (10,991); Morgantown, WV
December 21, 2019*; 1:00 pm	No. 25	at Youngstown State	W 75–64	10–1	19 – Tshiebwe	7 – Culver	7 – Culver	Covelli Centre (3,614); Youngstown, OH
December 29, 2019*; 12:00 pm, FS1	No. 22	vs. No. 2 Ohio State; Cleveland Classic	W 67–59	11–1	21 – McBride	10 – Culver	3 – Haley/Osabuohien	Rocket Mortgage FieldHouse (16,781); Cleveland, OH
January 4, 2020; 4:00 pm, ESPN+	No. 16	at No. 3 Kansas	L 53–60	11–2 (0–1)	17 – Tshiebwe	17 – Tshiebwe	2 – Culver	Allen Fieldhouse (16,300); Lawrence, KS
January 6, 2020; 9:00 pm, ESPN2	No. 17	at Oklahoma State	W 55–41	12–2 (1–1)	12 – Tshiebwe	12 – Culver	2 – Tied	Gallagher-Iba Arena (6,764); Stillwater, OK
January 11, 2020; 6:00 pm, ESPN	No. 17	No. 22 Texas Tech	W 66–54	13–2 (2–1)	22 – McBride	17 – Tshiebwe	2 – 4 Tied	WVU Coliseum (14,111); Morgantown, WV
January 14, 2020; 9:00 pm, ESPNU	No. 12	TCU	W 81–49	14–2 (3–1)	17 – Culver	11 – Culver	5 – Osabuohien	WVU Coliseum (11,445); Morgantown, WV
January 18, 2020; 2:00 pm, ESPNU	No. 12	at Kansas State	L 68–84	14–3 (3–2)	11 – Tied	7 – Tshiebwe	2 – Tied	Bramlage Coliseum (8,549); Manhattan, KS
January 20, 2020; 7:00 pm, ESPNU	No. 14	Texas	W 97–59	15–3 (4–2)	13 – Tied	11 – Tshiebwe	4 – Sherman	WVU Coliseum (12,592); Morgantown, WV
January 25, 2020*; 12:00 pm, ESPN	No. 14	Missouri; Big 12/SEC Challenge	W 74–51	16–3	15 – Tied	12 – Osabuohien	3 – McCabe	WVU Coliseum (14,031); Morgantown, WV
January 29, 2020; 8:00 pm, ESPN+	No. 12	at Texas Tech	L 81–89	16–4 (4–3)	16 – Culver	4 – Osabuohien	2 – Harler	United Supermarkets Arena (13,586); Lubbock, TX
February 1, 2020; 2:00 pm, ESPN2	No. 12	Kansas State	W 66–57	17–4 (5–3)	19 – Culver	14 – Culver	3 – McBride	WVU Coliseum (14,224); Morgantown, WV
February 5, 2020; 7:00 pm, ESPN2	No. 13	Iowa State	W 76–61	18–4 (6–3)	16 – Tshiebwe	10 – Tshiebwe	5 – Haley	WVU Coliseum (11,103); Morgantown, WV
February 8, 2020; 2:00 pm, ESPNU	No. 13	at Oklahoma	L 59–69	18–5 (6–4)	15 – Haley	9 – Tied	3 – Haleu	Lloyd Noble Center (8,484); Norman, OK
February 12, 2020; 7:00 pm, ESPN+	No. 14	No. 3 Kansas	L 49–58	18–6 (6–5)	14 – Tshiebwe	9 – Tshiebwe	4 – Culver	WVU Coliseum (14,212); Morgantown, WV
February 15, 2020; 4:00 pm, ESPN+	No. 14	at No. 1 Baylor	L 59–70	18–7 (6–6)	20 – Sherman	12 – Tshiebwe	2 – Sherman	Ferrell Center (10,305); Waco, TX
February 18, 2020; 7:00 pm, ESPN2	No. 17	Oklahoma State	W 65–47	19–7 (7–6)	11 – Tied	15 – Tshiebwe	2 – 4 tied	WVU Coliseum (12,053); Morgantown, WV
February 22, 2020; 2:00 pm, ESPNU	No. 17	at TCU	L 60–67 ^{OT}	19–8 (7–7)	18 – Culver	12 – Culver	4 – Tied	Schollmaier Arena (6,290); Fort Worth, TX
February 24, 2020; 7:00 pm, ESPNU	No. 20	at Texas	L 57–67	19–9 (7–8)	14 – Tshiebwe	6 – Tied	3 – Tied	Erwin Center (8,333); Austin, TX
February 29, 2020; 4:00 pm, ESPN2	No. 20	Oklahoma	L 62–73	19–10 (7–9)	13 – McBride	10 – Tshiebwe	2 – Tied	WVU Coliseum (14,044); Morgantown, WV
March 3, 2020; 9:00 pm, ESPNU		at Iowa State	W 77–71	20–10 (8–9)	17 – Tied	9 – Tied	3 – 3 tied	Hilton Coliseum (13,870); Ames, IA
March 7, 2020; 1:00 pm, ESPN+		No. 4 Baylor	W 76–64	21–10 (9–9)	18 – Matthews Jr.	12 – Tshiebwe	3 – McNeil	WVU Coliseum (14,014); Morgantown, WV
Big 12 tournament
Mar 12, 2020; 8:00 pm, ESPN2	(6); No. 22	vs. (3) Oklahoma; Quarterfinals	Cancelled due to the COVID-19 pandemic					Sprint Center; Kansas City, MO
*Non-conference game. ^{#}Rankings from AP Poll. (#) Tournament seedings in parentheses. All times are in Eastern Time.

== Rankings ==
Ranking movements Legend: ██ Increase in ranking ██ Decrease in ranking — = Not ranked RV = Received votes т = Tied with team above or below
	Week																			
Poll	Pre	1	2	3	4	5	6	7	8	9	10	11	12	13	14	15	16	17	18	Final
AP	—	—	RV	—	RV	RV	25	22	16	17	12	14	12	13	14	17	20	RV	22-T	24
Coaches	—	—	—	RV	RV	—	RV	23	17	17	13	15	11	11	14	18	19	RV	23	24

*AP does not release post-NCAA Tournament rankings.
