= 2019–20 Texas Longhorns men's basketball team =

American college basketball season

2019–20 Texas Longhorns men's basketball
- Conference: Big 12 Conference
- Record: 19–12 (9–9 Big 12)
- Head coach: Shaka Smart (5th season)
- Assistant coaches: Luke Yaklich; Neill Berry; Jai Lucas
- Home arena: Frank Erwin Center

2019–20 Big 12 men's basketball standings
	Conf.				Overall
Team	W		L	PCT	W		L	PCT
No. 1 Kansas	17	–	1	.944	28	–	3	.903
No. 5 Baylor	15	–	3	.833	26	–	4	.867
No. 24 West Virginia	9	–	9	.500	21	–	10	.677
Texas	9	–	9	.500	19	–	12	.613
Oklahoma	9	–	9	.500	19	–	12	.613
Texas Tech	9	–	9	.500	18	–	13	.581
TCU	7	–	11	.389	16	–	16	.500
Oklahoma State	7	–	11	.389	18	–	14	.563
Iowa State	5	–	13	.278	12	–	20	.375
Kansas State	3	–	15	.167	11	–	21	.344
Note: The 2020 Big 12 Tournament was canceled prior to the quarterfinals due to the COVID-19 pandemic. Rankings from AP poll

The 2019–20 Texas Longhorns men's basketball team represent the University of Texas at Austin in the 2019–20 NCAA Division I men's basketball season. They were led by fifth-year head coach Shaka Smart and play their home games at the Frank Erwin Center in Austin, Texas as members of the Big 12 Conference.

== Previous season ==
The Longhorns finished the 2018–19 season 21–16, 8–10 in Big 12 play to finish in sixth place. They were defeated by Kansas in the first round of the Big 12 tournament. They received an at-large bid to the 2019 National Invitational Tournament as a No. 2 seed. They defeated South Dakota State in the first round, Xavier in the second round and Colorado in the quarterfinals to advance win the Alabama bracket. They advanced to Madison Square Garden where they defeated TCU in the semifinals and Lipscomb in the final to win the program's second-ever NIT Championship (the first was in 1978).

== Offseason ==
=== Coaching changes ===
In April 2019, associate head coach Darrin Horn accepted the position of Northern Kentucky head basketball coach. Smart hired Luke Yaklich as Horn's replacement in May 2019.

=== Departures ===
Name	Number	Pos.	Height	Weight	Year	Hometown	Reason for departure
Jaxson Hayes	10	C	6'11"	220	Freshman	Cincinnati, OH	Declared for the NBA draft; selected 8th overall by the Atlanta Hawks.
Kerwin Roach	12	F	6'4"	180	Senior	Houston, TX	Graduated
Dylan Osetkowski	21	F/C	6'9"	250	Senior	San Diego, CA	Graduated
Elijah Mitrou-Long	55	G	6'1"	185	RS Junior	Mississauga, ON	Graduate transferred to UNLV

=== 2019 recruiting class ===
College recruiting information
Name	Hometown	School	Height	Weight	Commit date
Will Baker; C	Austin, Texas	Westlake HS	7 ft 0 in (2.13 m)	235 lb (107 kg)	Nov 8, 2018
Will Baker; C	Recruit ratings: Scout: Rivals: 247Sports: ESPN:				
Kai Jones; C	Nassau, Bahamas	Brewster Academy	6 ft 10 in (2.08 m)	205 lb (93 kg)	Oct 15, 2018
Kai Jones; C	Recruit ratings: Scout: Rivals: 247Sports: ESPN:				
Donovan Williams; SG	Missouri City, Texas	Fort Bend Elkins HS	6 ft 5 in (1.96 m)	180 lb (82 kg)	Sep 12, 2018
Donovan Williams; SG	Recruit ratings: Scout: Rivals: 247Sports: ESPN:				
Overall recruit ranking:
Note: In many cases, Scout, Rivals, 247Sports, On3, and ESPN may conflict in their listings of height and weight.; In these cases, the average was taken. ESPN grades are on a 100-point scale.; Sources: "2019 Texas Basketball Commitment List". Rivals.; "Texas 2019 Basketball Commits". Scout.; "2019 Player Commits". ESPN.; "Scout.com Team Recruiting Rankings". Scout.; "2019 Team Ranking". Rivals.

=== 2020 Recruiting class ===
College recruiting information (2020)
Name	Hometown	School	Height	Weight	Commit date
Greg Brown; PF	Austin, TX	Vandegrift (TX)	6 ft 9 in (2.06 m)	205 lb (93 kg)	Apr 24, 2020
Greg Brown; PF	Recruit ratings: Rivals: 247Sports: ESPN: (95)				
Overall recruit ranking: 247Sports: 96
Note: In many cases, Scout, Rivals, 247Sports, On3, and ESPN may conflict in their listings of height and weight.; In these cases, the average was taken. ESPN grades are on a 100-point scale.; Sources: "Texas 2020 Basketball Commitments". Rivals.; "2020 Texas Longhorns Recruiting Class". ESPN.; "2020 Team Ranking". Rivals.

== Roster ==
2019–20 Texas Longhorns men's basketball team
Players
Coaches

Pos.	#	Name	Height	Weight	Year	Previous school	Hometown
F	0	Gerald Liddell	6 ft 8 in (2.03 m)	200 lb (91 kg)	So	Byron P. Steele HS	Cibolo, TX
G	1	Andrew Jones	6 ft 4 in (1.93 m)	185 lb (84 kg)	RS So	MacArthur HS	Irving, TX
G	2	Matt Coleman III	6 ft 2 in (1.88 m)	185 lb (84 kg)	Jr	Oak Hill Academy	Norfolk, VA
G	3	Courtney Ramey	6 ft 3 in (1.91 m)	185 lb (84 kg)	So	Webster Groves HS	St. Louis, MO
G	4	Donovan Williams	6 ft 6 in (1.98 m)	180 lb (82 kg)	Fr	Fort Bend Elkins HS	Houston, TX
F	5	Royce Hamm Jr.	6 ft 8 in (2.03 m)	240 lb (109 kg)	Jr	Aldine Davis HS	Houston, TX
G	13	Jase Febres	6 ft 5 in (1.96 m)	195 lb (88 kg)	Jr	Westfield HS	Houston, TX
G	14	Drayton Whiteside (W)	6 ft 0 in (1.83 m)	160 lb (73 kg)	Sr	Vandegrift HS	Austin, TX
F/C	20	Jericho Sims	6 ft 10 in (2.08 m)	240 lb (109 kg)	Jr	Cristo Rey Jesuit HS	Minneapolis, MN
C	22	Kai Jones	6 ft 11 in (2.11 m)	218 lb (99 kg)	Fr	Brewster Academy	Nassau, Bahamas
F	30	Brock Cunningham	6 ft 6 in (1.98 m)	215 lb (98 kg)	RS Fr	Westlake HS	Austin, TX
F	33	Kamaka Hepa	6 ft 9 in (2.06 m)	225 lb (102 kg)	So	Jefferson HS	Barrow, AK
C	50	Will Baker	7 ft 0 in (2.13 m)	245 lb (111 kg)	Fr	Westlake HS	Austin, TX

Head coach

- Shaka Smart (Kenyon)

Assistant coach(es)

- Luke Yaklich (Illinois State)
- Neill Berry (Southeastern Louisiana)
- Jai Lucas (Texas)

Legend

- (C) Team captain
- (S) Suspended
- (I) Ineligible
- (W) Walk-on
- Injured
- Current redshirt

Roster
Last update: November 1, 2019

== Schedule and results ==
Date time, TV	Rank^{#}	Opponent^{#}	Result	Record	High points	High rebounds	High assists	Site (attendance) city, state
Regular season
November 5, 2019*; 7:00 pm, LHN		Northern Colorado	W 69–45	1–0	20 – Jones	10 – Ramey	4 – Ramey	Frank Erwin Center (8,208); Austin, TX
November 9, 2019*; 6:00 pm, FS1		at No. 23 Purdue	W 70–66	2–0	22 – Coleman III	8 – Liddell	7 – Coleman III	Mackey Arena (14,804); West Lafayette, IN
November 12, 2019*; 7:00 pm, LHN		California Baptist; 2K Sports Classic Campus–Site Game	W 67–54	3–0	19 – Ramey	11 – Sims	5 – Coleman III	Frank Erwin Center (8,157); Austin, TX
November 15, 2019*; 7:00 pm, LHN		Prairie View A&M; 2K Sports Classic Campus–Site Game	W 70–56	4–0	17 – Coleman III	10 – Sims	4 – Coleman III	Frank Erwin Center (8,670); Austin, TX
November 21, 2019*; 6:00 pm, ESPN2	No. 22	vs. Georgetown; 2K Sports Classic semifinal	L 66–82	4–1	22 – Coleman III	5 – Hamm Jr.	5 – Ramey	Madison Square Garden (12,606); New York, NY
November 22, 2019*; 4:00 pm, ESPN2	No. 22	vs. California; 2K Sports Classic 3rd place game	W 62–45	5–1	14 – Coleman III	9 – Sims	6 – Coleman III	Madison Square Garden (12,500); New York, NY
November 30, 2019*; 1:00 pm, LHN		McNeese State	W 73–71	6–1	14 – Tied	11 – Sims	10 – Coleman III	Frank Erwin Center (8,482); Austin, TX
December 3, 2019*; 7:00 pm, LHN		UAB	W 67–57	7–1	20 – Jones	5 – Ramey	4 – Tied	Frank Erwin Center (14,552); Austin, TX
December 8, 2019*; 2:00 pm, ABC		vs. Texas A&M; Lone Star Showdown	W 60–50	8–1	17 – Febres	6 – Sims	7 – Ramey	Dickies Arena (9,136); Fort Worth, TX
December 14, 2019*; 1:00 pm, LHN		Central Michigan	W 87–76	9–1	23 – Febres	12 – Hamm Jr.	6 – Ramey	Frank Erwin Center (8,587); Austin, TX
December 21, 2019*; 1:00 pm, FOX		at Providence; Big East/Big 12 Battle	L 48–70	9–2	12 – Camey	13 – Sims	2 – Tied	Dunkin' Donuts Center (9,876); Providence, RI
December 30, 2019*; 7:00 pm, LHN		High Point	W 89–58	10–2	16 – Febres	11 – Sims	8 – Coleman III	Frank Erwin Center (8,652); Austin, TX
January 4, 2020; 7:00 pm, ESPN2		at No. 6 Baylor	L 44–59	10–3 (0–1)	13 – Sims	15 – Sims	3 – Hepa	Ferrell Center (6,063); Waco, TX
January 8, 2020; 8:00 pm, ESPN2		Oklahoma	L 62–72	10–4 (0–2)	14 – Ramey	15 – Sims	3 – Coleman	Frank Erwin Center (8,805); Austin, TX
January 11, 2020; 7:00 pm, LHN		Kansas State	W 64–50	11–4 (1–2)	14 – Coleman	8 – Sims	8 – Ramey	Frank Erwin Center (8,496); Austin, TX
January 15, 2020; 7:00 pm, ESPN+		at Oklahoma State	W 76–64	12–4 (2–2)	15 – Febres	9 – Ramey	6 – Ramey	Gallagher-Iba Arena (13,611); Stillwater, OK
January 18, 2020; 1:00 pm, ESPN		No. 6 Kansas	L 57–66	12–5 (2–3)	20 – Sims	6 – Sims	5 – Ramey	Frank Erwin Center (11,762); Austin, TX
January 20, 2020; 6:00 pm, ESPNU		at No. 14 West Virginia	L 59–97	12–6 (2–4)	18 – Febres	3 – Hepa	4 – Coleman III	WVU Coliseum (12,592); Morgantown, WV
January 25, 2019*; 1:00 pm, ESPN		LSU; Big 12/SEC Challenge	L 67–69	12–7	20 – Jones	7 – Sims	2 – Tied	Frank Erwin Center (16,540); Austin, TX
January 29, 2020; 7:00 pm, ESPN+		at TCU	W 62–61	13–7 (3–4)	15 – Febres	13 – Sims	7 – Coleman III	Schollmaier Arena (6,698); Fort Worth, TX
February 1, 2020; 1:00 pm, LHN		Iowa State	W 72–68	14–7 (4–4)	14 – 3 Tied	9 – Sims	4 – Coleman III	Frank Erwin Center (8,797); Austin, TX
February 3, 2020; 8:00 pm, ESPN		at No. 3 Kansas	L 58–69	14–8 (4–5)	20 – Coleman III	9 – Sims	2 – Williams	Allen Fieldhouse (16,300); Lawrence, KS
February 8, 2020; 3:00 pm, ESPN2		Texas Tech	L 57–62	14–9 (4–6)	18 – Jones	7 – Tied	3 – Coleman III	Frank Erwin Center (12,887); Austin, TX
February 10, 2020; 8:00 pm, ESPN		No. 1 Baylor	L 45–52	14–10 (4–7)	11 – Coleman III	14 – Sims	3 – Ramey	Frank Erwin Center (9,433); Austin, TX
February 15, 2020; 1:00 pm, ESPN2		at Iowa State	L 52–81	14–11 (4–8)	21 – Ramey	7 – Baker	2 – Tied	Hilton Coliseum (14,255); Ames, IA
February 19, 2020; 7:00 pm, LHN		TCU	W 70–56	15–11 (5–8)	21 – A. Jones	6 – Tied	5 – Ramey	Frank Erwin Center (8,395); Austin, TX
February 22, 2020; 1:00 pm, CBS		at Kansas State	W 70–59	16–11 (6–8)	26 – Ramey	6 – Ramey	3 – Coleman III	Bramlage Coliseum (9,700); Manhattan, KS
February 24, 2020; 6:00 pm, ESPNU		No. 20 West Virginia	W 67–57	17–11 (7–8)	22 – A. Jones	6 – K. Jones	4 – Ramey	Frank Erwin Center (8,333); Austin, TX
February 29, 2020; 11:00 am, ESPN		at No. 22 Texas Tech	W 68–58	18–11 (8–8)	22 – Jones	6 – Hamm Jr.	2 – Hamm Jr.	United Supermarkets Arena (15,098); Lubbock, TX
March 3, 2020; 8:00 pm, ESPN2		at Oklahoma	W 52–51	19–11 (9–8)	21 – Coleman III	11 – Tied	2 – Coleman III	Lloyd Noble Center (10,110); Norman, OK
March 7, 2020; 3:00 pm, ESPN2		Oklahoma State	L 59–81	19–12 (9–9)	20 – K. Jones	7 – K. Jones	3 – A. Jones	Frank Erwin Center (12,733); Austin, TX
Big 12 Tournament
Mar 12, 2020; 11:30 am, ESPN2	(4)	vs. (5) Texas Tech; Quarterfinals	Cancelled due to the COVID-19 pandemic					Sprint Center; Kansas City, MO
*Non-conference game. ^{#}Rankings from AP Poll. (#) Tournament seedings in parentheses. All times are in Central Time.

== Rankings ==
Ranking movements Legend: ██ Increase in ranking ██ Decrease in ranking — = Not ranked RV = Received votes
	Week																				
Poll	Pre	1	2	3	4	5	6	7	8	9	10	11	12	13	14	15	16	17	18	19	Final
AP	—	RV	22	RV	RV	RV	RV	RV	—	—	—	—	—	—	—	—	—	—			Not released
Coaches	RV	RV*	22	RV	RV	RV	RV	RV	—	—	—	—	—	—	—	—	—	RV			

*AP does not release post-NCAA Tournament rankings.
