= 2020 Big 12 men's basketball tournament =

- Classification: Division I
- Season: 2019–20
- Teams: 10
- Site: Sprint Center; Kansas City, Missouri
- Champions: None (Canceled)
- Attendance: 17,606
- Television: ESPN, ESPN2, ESPNU

2019–20 Big 12 men's basketball standings
	Conf.				Overall
Team	W		L	PCT	W		L	PCT
No. 1 Kansas	17	–	1	.944	28	–	3	.903
No. 5 Baylor	15	–	3	.833	26	–	4	.867
No. 24 West Virginia	9	–	9	.500	21	–	10	.677
Texas	9	–	9	.500	19	–	12	.613
Oklahoma	9	–	9	.500	19	–	12	.613
Texas Tech	9	–	9	.500	18	–	13	.581
TCU	7	–	11	.389	16	–	16	.500
Oklahoma State	7	–	11	.389	18	–	14	.563
Iowa State	5	–	13	.278	12	–	20	.375
Kansas State	3	–	15	.167	11	–	21	.344
Note: The 2020 Big 12 Tournament was canceled prior to the quarterfinals due to the COVID-19 pandemic. Rankings from AP poll

The 2020 Phillips 66 Big 12 men's basketball tournament was a postseason men's basketball tournament for the Big 12 Conference. It was scheduled to be played from March 11 to 14, in Kansas City, Missouri at the Sprint Center. The winner would have received the conference's automatic bid to the 2020 NCAA tournament.

On March 11, 2020, Big 12 commissioner Bob Bowlsby announced that fans would not be allowed to attend the tournament beginning with the games on March 12 due to concerns over the COVID-19 pandemic. The two First Round games that took place on March 11 were completed with fans in attendance. The rest of the tournament was scheduled to be completed without fans in attendance. The following day, the conference announced it had cancelled the tournament completely. Later that same day, the NCAA Tournament was canceled before the conference named their automatic bid.

== Seeds ==
All 10 conference teams were slated to participate in the tournament. The top six teams earned a first round bye.

Teams were seeded by record within the conference, with a tiebreaker system to seed teams with identical conference records.

2020 Big 12 Men's Basketball Tournament seeds
Seed	School	Conf	Tiebreaker 1	Tiebreaker 2	Tiebreaker 3	Tiebreaker 4
1	Kansas	17–1				
2	Baylor	15–3				
3	Oklahoma	9–9	4–2 vs. Texas/Texas Tech/West Virginia			
4	Texas	9–9	3–3 vs. Oklahoma/Texas Tech/West Virginia	0-2 vs. Kansas	0-2 vs. Baylor	3-1 vs. TCU/Oklahoma State
5	Texas Tech	9–9	3–3 vs. Oklahoma/Texas/West Virginia	0-2 vs. Kansas	0-2 vs. Baylor	2-2 vs. TCU/Oklahoma State
6	West Virginia	9–9	2–4 vs. Oklahoma/Texas/Texas Tech			
7	TCU	7–11	1–1 vs. Oklahoma State	0-2 vs. Kansas	1–1 vs. Baylor	
8	Oklahoma State	7–11	1–1 vs. TCU	0-2 vs. Kansas	0–2 vs. Baylor	
9	Iowa State	5–13				
10	Kansas State	3–15				

== Schedule ==
Game	Time*	Matchup^{#}	Final score	Television	Attendance
First round – Wednesday, March 11
1	6:00 pm	No. 8 Oklahoma State vs No. 9 Iowa State	72–71	ESPNU	17,606
2	8:00 pm	No. 7 TCU vs No. 10 Kansas State	49–53	ESPNU	17,606
Quarterfinals – Thursday, March 12
3	11:30 am	No. 4 Texas vs No. 5 Texas Tech	Cancelled	ESPN2	–
4	1:30 pm	No. 1 Kansas vs No. 8 Oklahoma State	Cancelled	ESPN2	–
5	6:00 pm	No. 2 Baylor vs No. 10 Kansas State	Cancelled	ESPN2	–
6	8:00 pm	No. 3 Oklahoma vs No. 6 West Virginia	Cancelled	ESPN2	–
Semifinals – Friday, March 13
7	6:00 pm	Winner of game 3 vs Winner of game 4	Cancelled	ESPN2	–
8	8:00 pm	Winner of game 5 vs Winner of game 6	Cancelled	ESPN2	–
Championship – Saturday, March 14
9	5:00 pm	Winner of game 7 vs Winner of game 8	Cancelled	ESPN	–
*Game times in CDT. #-Rankings denote tournament seed

== Bracket ==
First round Wednesday, March 11
8	Oklahoma State	72
9	Iowa State	71
7	TCU	49
10	Kansas State	53

Quarterfinals; Thursday, March 12
1	Kansas
8	Oklahoma State
4	Texas
5	Texas Tech
2	Baylor
10	Kansas State
3	Oklahoma
6	West Virginia

Semifinals; Friday, March 13

Championship; Saturday, March 14
