= 2019–20 TCU Horned Frogs men's basketball team =

American college basketball season

2019–20 TCU Horned Frogs men's basketball
- Conference: Big 12 Conference
- Record: 16–16 (7–11 Big 12)
- Head coach: Jamie Dixon (4th season)
- Assistant coaches: Ryan Miller (4th season); Tony Benford; Duane Broussard
- Home arena: Schollmaier Arena

2019–20 Big 12 men's basketball standings
	Conf.				Overall
Team	W		L	PCT	W		L	PCT
No. 1 Kansas	17	–	1	.944	28	–	3	.903
No. 5 Baylor	15	–	3	.833	26	–	4	.867
No. 24 West Virginia	9	–	9	.500	21	–	10	.677
Texas	9	–	9	.500	19	–	12	.613
Oklahoma	9	–	9	.500	19	–	12	.613
Texas Tech	9	–	9	.500	18	–	13	.581
TCU	7	–	11	.389	16	–	16	.500
Oklahoma State	7	–	11	.389	18	–	14	.563
Iowa State	5	–	13	.278	12	–	20	.375
Kansas State	3	–	15	.167	11	–	21	.344
Note: The 2020 Big 12 Tournament was canceled prior to the quarterfinals due to the COVID-19 pandemic. Rankings from AP poll

The 2019–20 TCU Horned Frogs men's basketball team represented Texas Christian University in the 2019–20 NCAA Division I men's basketball season, led by head coach Jamie Dixon in his fourth season at TCU. The Horned Frogs competed as members of the Big 12 Conference and played their home games at Schollmaier Arena in Fort Worth, Texas.

== Previous season ==
They finished the season 23–14, 7–11 in Big 12 play to finish in a tie for seventh place. They lost in the quarterfinals of the Big 12 tournament to Kansas State. They received an at-large bid to the NIT as the No. 1 seed where they lost in the semifinals to Texas.

== Offseason ==
=== Departures ===
Name	Number	Pos.	Height	Weight	Year	Hometown	Reason for departure
Kaden Archie	0	G	6'6"	205	Freshman	Midlothian, TX	Transferred to UTEP
Kendric Davis	5	G	5'11"	180	Freshman	Houston, TX	Transferred to SMU
Jaylen Fisher	10	G	6'2"	195	Junior	Arlington, TN	Transferred to Grand Canyon
Lat Mayen	11	F	6'8"	210	RS Freshman	Adelaide, Australia	Transferred to Chipola College
Kouat Noi	12	F	6'8"	205	RS Sophomore	Newcastle, Australia	Declared for the 2019 NBA draft
JD Miller	15	F	6'8"	235	Senior	Dallas, TX	Graduated
Angus McWilliam	23	F	6'10"	235	RS Freshman	Christchurch, New Zealand	Transferred to UC Riverside
Alex Robinson	25	G	6'1"	175	Senior	Arlington, TX	Graduated
Yuat Alok	35	F	6'11"	225	Junior	Auckland, New Zealand	Transferred to UCF

=== Incoming transfers ===
Name	Number	Pos.	Height	Weight	Year	Hometown	Previous School
Edric Dennis Jr.	2	G	6'3"	190	RS Senior	Dallas, TX	UT Arlington
Jaire Grayer	5	G	6'5"	210	RS Senior	Flint, MI	George Mason
Kevin Easley Jr.	15	F	6'7"	225	Sophomore	Indianapolis, IN	Chattanooga
Jaedon LeDee	23	F	6'9"	235	Sophomore	Houston, TX	Ohio State

== Recruits ==
=== Recruiting class of 2019 ===
College recruiting information
Name	Hometown	School	Height	Weight	Commit date
PJ Fuller #11 SG	Seattle, WA	Findlay Prep	6 ft 4 in (1.93 m)	175 lb (79 kg)	Sep 8, 2018
PJ Fuller #11 SG	Recruit ratings: Scout: Rivals: 247Sports: ESPN:				
Diante Smith; SF	Fort Walton Beach, FL	Choctawhatchee High School	6 ft 7 in (2.01 m)	195 lb (88 kg)	Sep 9, 2018
Diante Smith; SF	Recruit ratings: Scout: Rivals: 247Sports: ESPN:				
Overall recruit ranking:
Note: In many cases, Scout, Rivals, 247Sports, On3, and ESPN may conflict in their listings of height and weight.; In these cases, the average was taken. ESPN grades are on a 100-point scale.; Sources: "2019 TCU Commits". Rivals.; "2019 Team Ranking". Rivals.

== Roster ==
2019–20 TCU Horned Frogs men's basketball team
Players
Coaches

Pos.	#	Name	Height	Weight	Year	Previous school	Hometown
F	0	Mickey Pearson Jr.	6 ft 7 in (2.01 m)	200 lb (91 kg)	Fr	Hargrave Military	Lincoln, AL
G	1	Desmond Bane	6 ft 6 in (1.98 m)	215 lb (98 kg)	Sr	Seton Catholic	Richmond, IN
G	2	Edric Dennis Jr.	6 ft 3 in (1.91 m)	190 lb (86 kg)	RS Sr	DeSoto/UT Arlington	Dallas, TX
G	3	Francisco Farabello	6 ft 2 in (1.88 m)	183 lb (83 kg)	Fr	NBA Global Academy	Cañada de Gómez, Argentina
G	4	PJ Fuller	6 ft 4 in (1.93 m)	175 lb (79 kg)	Fr	Findlay Prep	Seattle, WA
G	5	Jaire Grayer	6 ft 5 in (1.96 m)	210 lb (95 kg)	RS Sr	IMG Academy/George Mason	Flint, MI
F	10	Diante Smith	6 ft 7 in (2.01 m)	200 lb (91 kg)	Fr	Choctawhatchee	Fort Walton Beach, FL
G	11	Taryn Todd	6 ft 3 in (1.91 m)	175 lb (79 kg)	Fr	Findlay Prep	Vaughan, ON
G	12	Justin Huelskamp (W)	6 ft 4 in (1.93 m)	190 lb (86 kg)	Fr	San Joaquin Memorial HS	Fresno, CA
G	13	Dylan Arnette	6 ft 3 in (1.91 m)	175 lb (79 kg)	RS Fr	Dallas Carter	DeSoto, TX
G	14	Quinton Uribe (W)	5 ft 10 in (1.78 m)	140 lb (64 kg)	Fr	Alamo Heights HS	San Antonio, TX
F	15	Kevin Easley Jr.	6 ft 7 in (2.01 m)	225 lb (102 kg)	So	Lawrence North/Chattanooga	Indianapolis, IN
G	20	Anthony Lucenti (W)	6 ft 3 in (1.91 m)	210 lb (95 kg)	Fr	Loyola HS	Manhattan Beach, CA
C	21	Kevin Samuel	6 ft 11 in (2.11 m)	250 lb (113 kg)	RS So	Redemption Christian	Houston, TX
G	22	RJ Nembhard	6 ft 4 in (1.93 m)	195 lb (88 kg)	RS So	Keller HS	Keller, TX
F	23	Jaedon LeDee (redshirt)	6 ft 9 in (2.06 m)	235 lb (107 kg)	So	The Kinkaid School/Ohio State	Houston, TX
G	30	Harrison Young	5 ft 11 in (1.8 m)	170 lb (77 kg)	Fr	Impact Academy	Auckland, New Zealand
G	31	Owen Aschieris (W)	6 ft 1 in (1.85 m)	165 lb (75 kg)	Jr	Santa Fe Christian Schools	San Diego, CA
G	35	Nikola Vasiljevic	6 ft 4 in (1.93 m)	190 lb (86 kg)	Fr	North Central Texas Academy	Belgrade, Serbia

Head coach

- Jamie Dixon (TCU)

Assistant coach(es)

- Tony Benford, Assistant Coach (Texas Tech)
- Ryan Miller, Assistant Coach (Northern State)
- Duane Broussard, Assistant Coach (Bradley)
- Thomas Montigel, Operations Coordinator (TCU)
- Xavier Adams, Graduate Assistant
- Matt Carlino, Graduate Assistant
- David Vogel, Graduate Assistant
- Stephen Gephardt, Assistant Strength Coach
- Matt Herrill, Associate Director of Sports Medicine

Legend

- (C) Team captain
- (S) Suspended
- (I) Ineligible
- (W) Walk-on
- Injured
- Current redshirt

Roster

== Schedule and results ==
Date time, TV	Rank^{#}	Opponent^{#}	Result	Record	Site (attendance) city, state
Regular season
November 7, 2019*; 7:00 pm, FSSW+		Southwestern	W 83–62	1–0	Schollmaier Arena (6,380); Fort Worth, TX
November 12, 2019*; 7:00 pm, FSSW		Louisiana; MGM Resorts Main Event Campus Site Game	W 98–65	2–0	Schollmaier Arena (5,887); Fort Worth, TX
November 18, 2019*; 8:00 pm, FSSW		Air Force	W 65–54	3–0	Schollmaier Arena (6,110); Fort Worth, TX
November 21, 2019*; 7:00 pm, FSSW		UC Irvine; MGM Resorts Main Event Campus Site Game	W 59–58	4–0	Schollmaier Arena (5,892); Fort Worth, TX
November 24, 2019*; 9:30 pm, ESPN2		vs. Clemson; MGM Resorts Main Event semifinals	L 60–62 ^{OT}	4–1	T-Mobile Arena; Paradise, NV
November 26, 2019*; 8:00 pm, FloSports		vs. Wyoming; MGM Resorts Main Event consolation game	W 64–47	5–1	T-Mobile Arena; Paradise, NV
December 3, 2019*; 8:00 pm, FSSW+		Illinois State	W 81–69	6–1	Schollmaier Arena (5,991); Fort Worth, TX
December 6, 2019*; 8:00 pm, ESPN2		vs. USC	L 78–80	6–2	Dickies Arena (5,656); Fort Worth, TX
December 11, 2019*; 7:00 pm, FSSW		Winthrop	W 70–60	7–2	Schollmaier Arena (6,314); Fort Worth, TX
December 14, 2019*; 2:00 pm, FSSW		Lamar	W 79–50	8–2	Schollmaier Arena (6,314); Fort Worth, TX
December 22, 2019*; 4:00 pm, ESPN2		Xavier; Big East–Big XII Alliance	L 59–67	8–3	Schollmaier Arena (6,445); Fort Worth, TX
December 30, 2019*; 8:00 pm, FSSW		George Mason	W 87–53	9–3	Schollmaier Arena (5,992); Fort Worth, TX
January 4, 2020; 5:00 pm, ESPNU		Iowa State	W 81–79 ^{OT}	10–3 (1–0)	Schollmaier Arena (5,821); Fort Worth, TX
January 7, 2020; 8:00 pm, ESPNU		at Kansas State	W 59–57	11–3 (2–0)	Bramlage Coliseum (7,119); Manhattan, KS
January 11, 2020; 1:00 pm, ESPN2		Oklahoma State	W 52–40	12–3 (3–0)	Schollmaier Arena (6,001); Fort Worth, TX
January 14, 2020; 8:00 pm, ESPNU		at No. 12 West Virginia	L 49–81	12–4 (3–1)	WVU Coliseum (11,445); Morgantown, WV
January 18, 2020; 1:00 pm, ESPN+		at Oklahoma	L 63–83	12–5 (3–2)	Lloyd Noble Center (8,699); Norman, OK
January 21, 2020; 7:00 pm, ESPN+		No. 18 Texas Tech	W 65–54	13–5 (4–2)	Schollmaier Arena (6,966); Fort Worth, TX
January 25, 2020*; 3:00 pm, ESPN2		at Arkansas; Big 12/SEC Challenge	L 67–78	13–6	Bud Walton Arena (19,200); Fayetteville, AR
January 29, 2020; 7:00 pm, ESPN+		Texas	L 61–62	13–7 (4–3)	Schollmaier Arena (6,698); Fort Worth, TX
February 1, 2020; 3:00 pm, ESPN2		at No. 1 Baylor	L 52–68	13–8 (4–4)	Ferrell Center (8,830); Waco, TX
February 5, 2020; 7:00 pm, ESPN+		Oklahoma State	L 57–72	13–9 (4–5)	Gallagher-Iba Arena (5,605); Stillwater, OK
February 8, 2020; 11:00 am, ESPN2		No. 3 Kansas	L 46–60	13–10 (4–6)	Schollmaier Arena (6,728); Fort Worth, TX
February 10, 2020; 8:00 pm, ESPN2		at No. 24 Texas Tech	L 42–88	13–11 (4–7)	United Supermarkets Arena (13,050); Lubbock, TX
February 15, 2020; 4:00 pm, ESPN+		Kansas State	W 68–57	14–11 (5–7)	Schollmaier Arena (6,288); Fort Worth, TX
February 19, 2020; 7:00 pm, LHN		at Texas	L 56–70	14–12 (5–8)	Frank Erwin Center (8,395); Austin, TX
February 22, 2020; 1:00 pm, ESPNU		No. 17 West Virginia	W 67–60	15–12 (6–8)	Schollmaier Arena (6,290); Fort Worth, TX
February 25, 2020; 6:00 pm, ESPNU		at Iowa State	L 59–65	15–13 (6–9)	Hilton Coliseum (13,791); Ames, IA
February 29, 2020; 1:00 pm, ESPN		No. 2 Baylor	W 75–72	16–13 (7–9)	Schollmaier Arena (6,549); Fort Worth, TX
March 4, 2020; 7:00 pm, ESPN+		at No. 1 Kansas	L 66–75	16–14 (7–10)	Allen Fieldhouse (16,300); Lawrence, KS
March 7, 2020; 5:00 pm, ESPN2		Oklahoma	L 76–78	16–15 (7–11)	Schollmaier Arena; Fort Worth, TX
Big 12 tournament
March 11, 2020; 8:00 pm, ESPNU	(7)	vs. (10) Kansas State; First round	L 49–53	16–16	Sprint Center (17606); Kansas City, MO
*Non-conference game. ^{#}Rankings from AP Poll. (#) Tournament seedings in parentheses. All times are in Central Time.

Schedule Source: GoFrogs.com
