= 2019–20 Kansas State Wildcats men's basketball team =

American college basketball season

2019–20 Kansas State Wildcats men's basketball
- Conference: Big 12 Conference
- Record: 11–21 (3–15 Big 12)
- Head coach: Bruce Weber (8th season)
- Assistant coaches: Chris Lowery (8th season); Brad Korn (5th season - 4th consecutive); Jermaine Henderson (1st season)
- Home arena: Bramlage Coliseum (12,528)

2019–20 Big 12 men's basketball standings
| | Conf. | | | | Overall |
| Team | W | | L | PCT | W | | L | PCT |
|---|---|---|---|---|---|---|---|---|
| No. 1 Kansas | 17 | – | 1 | .944 | 28 | – | 3 | .903 |
| No. 5 Baylor | 15 | – | 3 | .833 | 26 | – | 4 | .867 |
| No. 24 West Virginia | 9 | – | 9 | .500 | 21 | – | 10 | .677 |
| Texas | 9 | – | 9 | .500 | 19 | – | 12 | .613 |
| Oklahoma | 9 | – | 9 | .500 | 19 | – | 12 | .613 |
| Texas Tech | 9 | – | 9 | .500 | 18 | – | 13 | .581 |
| TCU | 7 | – | 11 | .389 | 16 | – | 16 | .500 |
| Oklahoma State | 7 | – | 11 | .389 | 18 | – | 14 | .563 |
| Iowa State | 5 | – | 13 | .278 | 12 | – | 20 | .375 |
| Kansas State | 3 | – | 15 | .167 | 11 | – | 21 | .344 |
Note: The 2020 Big 12 Tournament was canceled prior to the quarterfinals due to the COVID-19 pandemic. Rankings from AP poll

The 2019–20 Kansas State Wildcats men's basketball team represent Kansas State University in the 2019–20 NCAA Division I men's basketball season, their 117 basketball season. Their head coach is Bruce Weber in his eighth year at the helm of the Wildcats. The team plays its home games in Bramlage Coliseum in Manhattan, Kansas as members of the Big 12 Conference. They are the defending Big 12 regular season Co-Champions.

== Previous season ==
The Wildcats finished the 2018–19 season 25–9, 14–4 in Big 12 play and were the 2018-19 Big 12 Regular Season Co-Champions. They defeated TCU in the quarterfinals of the Big 12 tournament before losing to Iowa State in the semifinals. They received an at-large bid to the NCAA tournament as the No. 4 seed in the South region. There they lost to UC Irvine.

== Offseason ==
=== Departures ===
| Name | Number | Pos. | Height | Weight | Year | Hometown | Notes |
|---|---|---|---|---|---|---|---|
| Austin Trice | 23 | F | 6'7" | 235 | Junior | Chicago, IL | Transferred |
| Patrick Muldoon | 35 | F | 6'7" | 210 | RS Junior | Basehor, KS | Graduated |
| Kamau Stokes | 3 | G | 6'0" | 170 | Senior | Baltimore, MD | Graduated |
| Barry Brown Jr. | 5 | G | 6'3" | 195 | Senior | St. Petersburg, FL | Graduated |
| Dean Wade | 32 | F | 6'10" | 228 | Senior | St. John, KS | Graduated |

=== Incoming transfers ===
| Name | Number | Pos. | Height | Weight | Year | Hometown | Notes |
|---|---|---|---|---|---|---|---|
| David Sloan | 4 | G | 6'0" | 230 | Junior | Louisville, KY | John A. Logan College. |
| Joe Petrakis | 35 | F | 6'9" | 210 | Sophomore | Wichita, KS | Dodge City Community College |

=== 2019 recruiting class ===
College recruiting information
| Name | Hometown | School | Height | Weight | Commit date |
|---|---|---|---|---|---|
| Montavious Murphy; F | Houston, TX | Concordia Lutheran High School | 6 ft 9 in (2.06 m) | 215 lb (98 kg) | Aug 2, 2018 |
| Montavious Murphy; F | Recruit ratings: Scout: Rivals: 247Sports: ESPN: | | | | |
| DaJuan Gordon; G | Chicago, IL | Curie Metropolitan High School | 6 ft 4 in (1.93 m) | 170 lb (77 kg) | Sep 30, 2018 |
| DaJuan Gordon; G | Recruit ratings: Scout: Rivals: 247Sports: ESPN: | | | | |
| Antonio Gordon; F | Lawton, OK | Eisenhower High School | 6 ft 9 in (2.06 m) | 205 lb (93 kg) | Oct 1, 2018 |
| Antonio Gordon; F | Recruit ratings: Scout: Rivals: 247Sports: ESPN: | | | | |
Overall recruit ranking: Scout: Not Ranked Top 20 Rivals: Not Ranked Top 25 ESPN: Not Ranked Top 25
Note: In many cases, Scout, Rivals, 247Sports, On3, and ESPN may conflict in their listings of height and weight.; In these cases, the average was taken. ESPN grades are on a 100-point scale.; Sources: "2019 Kansas State Basketball Commits". Rivals.; "2019 Kansas State Basketball Commits". Scout.; "2019 Kansas State Basketball Commits". ESPN.; "Scout.com Team Recruiting Rankings". Scout.; "2019 Team Ranking". Rivals.

== Roster ==
2019–20 Kansas State Wildcats men's basketball team
Players
Coaches

| Pos. | # | Name | Height | Weight | Year | Previous school | Hometown |
|---|---|---|---|---|---|---|---|
| G | 00 | Mike McGuirl | 6 ft 2 in (1.88 m) | 188 lb (85 kg) | Jr | East Catholic High School | Ellington, CT |
| G | 1 | Shaun Williams | 6 ft 3 in (1.91 m) | 170 lb (77 kg) | So | Hazelwood Central High School | St. Louis, MO |
| G | 2 | Cartier Diarra | 6 ft 4 in (1.93 m) | 185 lb (84 kg) | RS Jr | West Florence High School | Florence, SC |
| G | 3 | Dajuan Gordon | 6 ft 4 in (1.93 m) | 185 lb (84 kg) | Fr | Curie Metropolitan High School | Chicago, IL |
| G | 4 | David Sloan | 6 ft 0 in (1.83 m) | 180 lb (82 kg) | Jr | John A. Logan College | Louisville, KY |
| F | 11 | Antonio Gordon | 6 ft 9 in (2.06 m) | 215 lb (98 kg) | Fr | Eisenhower High School | Lawton, OK |
| F | 14 | Makol Mawien | 6 ft 9 in (2.06 m) | 228 lb (103 kg) | Sr | New Mexico Junior College | West Valley City, UT |
| G/F | 20 | Xavier Sneed | 6 ft 5 in (1.96 m) | 215 lb (98 kg) | Sr | Hazelwood Central High School | Florissant, MO |
| F | 21 | James Love III | 6 ft 11 in (2.11 m) | 240 lb (109 kg) | RS So | American Heritage School | Fort Lauderdale, FL |
| F | 23 | Montavious Murphy | 6 ft 9 in (2.06 m) | 215 lb (98 kg) | Fr | Concordia Lutheran High School | Spring, TX |
| F | 24 | Pierson McAtee | 6 ft 6 in (1.98 m) | 200 lb (91 kg) | RS Sr | Manhattan High School | Manhattan, KS |
| F | 34 | Levi Stockard III | 6 ft 8 in (2.03 m) | 240 lb (109 kg) | Jr | Vashon High School | St. Louis, MO |
| F | 35 | Joe Petrakis (W) | 6 ft 9 in (2.06 m) | 210 lb (95 kg) | So | Dodge City Community College | Wichita, KS |
| F | 45 | Nigel Shadd | 6 ft 9 in (2.06 m) | 250 lb (113 kg) | RS So | Tri-City Christian Academy | Mesa, AZ |

Head coach

- Bruce Weber (Milwaukee)

Assistant coach(es)

- Chris Lowery (Southern Illinois)
- Brad Korn (Southern Illinois)
- Jermaine Henderson (Miami (OH))

Legend

- (C) Team captain
- (S) Suspended
- (I) Ineligible
- (W) Walk-on
- Injured
- Current redshirt

Roster
Last update: November 5, 2019

== Schedule and results ==
| Date time, TV | Rank^{#} | Opponent^{#} | Result | Record | High points | High rebounds | High assists | Site (attendance) city, state |
Exhibition
| October 25, 2019*; 8:00 pm, ESPN+ | | Emporia State | W 86–49 | – | 18 – Sneed | 11 – Murphy | 7 – Sloan | Bramlage Coliseum (8,805); Manhattan, KS |
| October 30, 2019*; 7:00 pm, ESPN+ | | Washburn | W 66–56 | – | 16 – Mawien | 9 – Tied | 4 – Tied | Bramlage Coliseum (7,239); Manhattan, KS |
Regular season
| November 5, 2019*; 7:00 pm, ESPN+ | | North Dakota State | W 67–54 | 1–0 | 23 – Diarra | 10 – Mawien | 6 – Diarra | Bramlage Coliseum (8,145); Manhattan, KS |
| November 9, 2019*; 3:00 pm, ESPN3 | | at UNLV | W 60–56 ^{OT} | 2–0 | 19 – Sneed | 6 – Murphy | 6 – Diarra | Thomas & Mack Center (8,796); Paradise, NV |
| November 13, 2019*; 6:50 pm, ESPN+ | | Monmouth; Fort Myers Tip-Off campus site game | W 73–54 | 3–0 | 15 – Sneed | 9 – Mawien | 7 – Diarra | Bramlage Coliseum (7,635); Manhattan, KS |
| November 19, 2019*; 7:00 pm, ESPN+ | | Arkansas–Pine Bluff; Fort Myers Tip-Off campus site game | W 62–51 | 4–0 | 21 – Sneed | 6 – Sneed | 9 – Diarra | Bramlage Coliseum (7,575); Manhattan, KS |
| November 25, 2019*; 5:00 pm, FS1 | | vs. Pittsburgh; Fort Myers Tip-Off semifinals | L 59–63 | 4–1 | 13 – Diarra | 7 – Gordon | 6 – Diarra | Suncoast Credit Union Arena (3,013); Fort Myers, FL |
| November 27, 2019*; 5:30 pm, FS1 | | vs. Bradley; Fort Myers Tip-Off 3rd place game | L 60–73 | 4–2 | 15 – Sneed | 9 – Sneed | 8 – Diarra | Suncoast Credit Union Arena (2,210); Fort Myers, FL |
| December 2, 2019*; 7:00 pm, ESPN+ | | Florida A&M | W 76–58 | 5–2 | 18 – Sneed | 6 – Mawien | 7 – Diarra | Bramlage Coliseum (7,417); Manhattan, KS |
| December 7, 2019*; 8:00 pm, ESPN2 | | Marquette; Big East/Big 12 Battle | L 71–83 | 5–3 | 12 – Sneed | 4 – Brown | 3 – Stokes | Bramlage Coliseum (10,073); Manhattan, KS |
| December 11, 2019*; 8:00 pm, ESPN+ | | Alabama State | W 86–41 | 6–3 | 20 – Sneed | 8 – Gordon | 10 – Diarra | Bramlage Coliseum (7,577); Manhattan, KS |
| December 14, 2019*; 10:30 am, ESPNU | | vs. Mississippi State; Never Forget Tribute Classic | L 61–67 | 6–4 | 20 – Diarra | 9 – Gordon | 3 – Sneed | Prudential Center; Newark, NJ |
| December 21, 2019*; 6:00 pm, ESPN+ | | vs. Saint Louis; Wildcat Classic | L 63–66 | 6–5 | 17 – Stockard III | 6 – McGuirl | 8 – Sloan | Sprint Center (11,625); Kansas City, MO |
| December 29, 2019*; 6:00 pm, ESPN+ | | Tulsa | W 69–67 | 7–5 | 25 – Diarra | 7 – Tied | 7 – Diarra | Bramlage Coliseum (8,370); Manhattan, KS |
| January 4, 2020; 5:00 pm, ESPN+ | | at Oklahoma | L 61–66 | 7–6 (0–1) | 22 – Sneed | 8 – Gordon | 7 – Diarra | Lloyd Noble Center (8,012); Norman, OK |
| January 7, 2020; 7:00 pm, ESPNU | | TCU | L 57–59 | 7–7 (0–2) | 19 – Sneed | 6 – Sneed | 4 – Diarra | Bramlage Coliseum (7,119); Manhattan, KS |
| January 11, 2020; 7:00 pm, LHN | | at Texas | L 50–64 | 7–8 (0–3) | 14 – Diarra | 5 – Gordon | 5 – Diarra | Frank Erwin Center (8,496); Austin, TX |
| January 14, 2020; 7:00 pm, ESPN+ | | No. 23 Texas Tech | L 63–77 | 7–9 (0–4) | 19 – Diarra | 6 – Murphy | 2 – Diarra | Bramlage Coliseum (7,327); Manhattan, KS |
| January 18, 2020; 1:00 pm, ESPN+ | | No. 12 West Virginia | W 84–68 | 8–9 (1–4) | 25 – Diarra | 6 – Tied | 5 – Sloan | Bramlage Coliseum (8,549); Manhattan, KS |
| January 21, 2020; 6:00 pm, ESPN2 | | at No. 3 Kansas; Sunflower Showdown | L 60–81 | 8–10 (1–5) | 17 – Sloan | 6 – Diarra | 5 – Sloan | Allen Fieldhouse (16,300); Lawrence, KS |
| January 25, 2020; 5:00 pm, ESPN2 | | at Alabama; Big 12/SEC Challenge | L 74–77 | 8–11 | 17 – Diarra | 12 – Mawien | 4 – Tied | Coleman Coliseum (11,824); Tuscaloosa, AL |
| January 29, 2020; 7:00 pm, ESPN+ | | Oklahoma | W 61–53 | 9–11 (2–5) | 16 – McGuirl | 10 – Mawien | 5 – Sloan | Bramlage Coliseum (8,472); Manhattan, KS |
| February 1, 2020; 1:00 pm, ESPN2 | | at No. 12 West Virginia | L 57–66 | 9–12 (2–6) | 13 – Sloan | 8 – Gordon | 3 – Sloan | WVU Coliseum (14,224); Morgantown, WV |
| February 3, 2020; 8:00 pm, ESPN2 | | No. 1 Baylor | L 67–73 | 9–13 (2–7) | 23 – Sneed | 8 – Tied | 3 – Tied | Bramlage Coliseum (8,888); Manhattan, KS |
| February 8, 2020; 7:00 pm, ESPN2 | | at Iowa State | L 63–73 | 9–14 (2–8) | 24 – Diarra | 7 – Sneed | 5 – Sloan | Hilton Coliseum (14,149); Ames, IA |
| February 11, 2020; 8:00 pm, ESPNU | | Oklahoma State | L 59–64 | 9–15 (2–9) | 16 – McGuirl | 7 – Diarra | 3 – Diarra | Bramlage Coliseum (7,967); Manhattan, KS |
| February 15, 2020; 4:00 pm, ESPN+ | | at TCU | L 57–68 | 9–16 (2–10) | 15 – Sneed | 9 – Mawien | 3 – Sloan | Schollmaier Arena (6,288); Fort Worth, TX |
| February 19, 2020; 8:00 pm, ESPN2 | | at Texas Tech | L 62–69 | 9–17 (2–11) | 15 – Sneed | 8 – Gordon | 2 – Tied | United Supermarkets Arena (14,695); Lubbock, TX |
| February 22, 2020; 1:00 pm, CBS | | Texas | L 59–70 | 9–18 (2–12) | 15 – Sneed | 10 – Mawien | 6 – Diarra | Bramlage Coliseum (9,700); Manhattan, KS |
| February 25, 2020; 7:00 pm, ESPN+ | | at No. 2 Baylor | L 66–85 | 9–19 (2–13) | 19 – Diarra | 6 – Tied | 5 – Sloan | Ferrell Center (7,939); Waco, TX |
| February 29, 2020; 12:30 pm, CBS | | No. 1 Kansas | L 58–62 | 9–20 (2–14) | 15 – Diarra | 5 – Sneed | 3 – Diarra | Bramlage Coliseum (9,003); Manhattan, KS |
| March 4, 2020; 8:00 pm, ESPNU | | at Oklahoma State | L 63–69 | 9–21 (2–15) | 16 – Diarra | 7 – Tied | 2 – Tied | Gallagher-Iba Arena (6,983); Stillwater, OK |
| March 7, 2020; 3:00 pm, ESPN+ | | Iowa State | W 79–63 | 10–21 (3–15) | 31 – Sneed | 5 – McAtee | 5 – Diarra | Bramlage Coliseum (8,439); Manhattan, KS |
Big 12 tournament
| March 11, 2020; 8:00 pm, ESPNU | (10) | vs. (7) TCU; First round | W 53–49 | 11–21 | 13 – Diarra | 7 – McGuirl | 6 – McGuirl | Sprint Center (17,606); Kansas City, MO |
| Mar 12, 2020; 6:00 pm, ESPN2 | (10) | vs. (2) No. 5 Baylor; Quarterfinals | Cancelled due to the COVID-19 pandemic | | | | | Sprint Center; Kansas City, MO |
*Non-conference game. ^{#}Rankings from AP Poll. (#) Tournament seedings in parentheses. All times are in Central Time.

== Rankings ==
Ranking movements Legend: ██ Increase in ranking ██ Decrease in ranking — = Not ranked RV = Received votes
| | Week | | | | | | | | | | | | | | | | | | | | |
| Poll | Pre | 1 | 2 | 3 | 4 | 5 | 6 | 7 | 8 | 9 | 10 | 11 | 12 | 13 | 14 | 15 | 16 | 17 | 18 | 19 | Final |
|---|---|---|---|---|---|---|---|---|---|---|---|---|---|---|---|---|---|---|---|---|---|
| AP | — | — | — | — | — | — | — | — | — | — | — | — | | | | | | | | | Not released |
| Coaches | — | — | | RV | RV | RV | — | — | — | — | — | — | | | | | | | | | |

*AP does not release post-NCAA tournament rankings
^Coaches did not release a Week 2 poll.
