= 2019–20 Baylor Bears basketball team =

American college basketball season

2019–20 Baylor Bears basketball

Myrtle Beach Invitational champions
- Conference: Big 12 Conference

Ranking
- Coaches: No. 4
- AP: No. 5
- Record: 26–4 (15–3 Big 12)
- Head coach: Scott Drew (17th season)
- Associate head coach: Jerome Tang (17th season)
- Assistant coaches: Alvin Brooks III (4th season); John Jakus (3rd season)
- Home arena: Ferrell Center

2019–20 Big 12 men's basketball standings
	Conf.				Overall
Team	W		L	PCT	W		L	PCT
No. 1 Kansas	17	–	1	.944	28	–	3	.903
No. 5 Baylor	15	–	3	.833	26	–	4	.867
No. 24 West Virginia	9	–	9	.500	21	–	10	.677
Texas	9	–	9	.500	19	–	12	.613
Oklahoma	9	–	9	.500	19	–	12	.613
Texas Tech	9	–	9	.500	18	–	13	.581
TCU	7	–	11	.389	16	–	16	.500
Oklahoma State	7	–	11	.389	18	–	14	.563
Iowa State	5	–	13	.278	12	–	20	.375
Kansas State	3	–	15	.167	11	–	21	.344
Note: The 2020 Big 12 Tournament was canceled prior to the quarterfinals due to the COVID-19 pandemic. Rankings from AP poll

The 2019–20 Baylor Bears basketball team were represented by Baylor University in the 2019–20 NCAA Division I men's basketball season. The Bears were led by 17th-year head coach Scott Drew and played their games at the Ferrell Center in Waco, Texas as members of the Big 12 Conference.

== Previous season ==
The Bears finished the 2018–19 season 20–14 overall and 10–8 in Big 12 play, finishing in fourth place. As the No. 4 seed in the Big 12 tournament, they were defeated by Iowa State in the quarterfinals. They received a no. 9 seed the NCAA tournament where they defeated Syracuse in the first round before losing to Gonzaga in the second round.

== Offseason ==
=== Departures ===
Name	Number	Pos.	Height	Weight	Year	Hometown	Reason for departure
King McClure	3	G	6'3"	215	Senior	Dallas, TX	Graduated
Mario Kegler	4	F	6'7"	190	RS Sophomore	Jackson, MS	Dismissed
Makai Mason	10	G	6'1"	185	RS Senior	Greenfield, MA	Graduated
Jake Lindsey	22	G	6'5"	200	Senior	Houston, TX	Graduated

=== Incoming transfers ===
Name	Number	Pos.	Height	Weight	Year	Hometown	Previous School
Adam Flagler	10	G	6'3"	180	Sophomore	Duluth, GA	Presbyterian
Jonathan Tchamwa Tchatchoua	23	G	6'8"	245	Sophomore	Douala, Cameroon	UNLV

=== 2019 recruiting class ===
College recruiting information
Name	Hometown	School	Height	Weight	Commit date
Jordan Turner; SF	Houston, TX	Sunrise Christian Academy	6 ft 6 in (1.98 m)	180 lb (82 kg)	Jun 13, 2018
Jordan Turner; SF	Recruit ratings: Rivals: 247Sports: ESPN: (82)				
Overall recruit ranking: Rivals: — 247Sports: 127 ESPN: —
Note: In many cases, Scout, Rivals, 247Sports, On3, and ESPN may conflict in their listings of height and weight.; In these cases, the average was taken. ESPN grades are on a 100-point scale.; Sources: "Baylor 2019 Basketball Commitments". Rivals.; "2019 Baylor Bears Recruiting Class". ESPN.; "2019 Team Ranking". Rivals.

=== 2020 Recruiting class ===
College recruiting information (2020)
Name	Hometown	School	Height	Weight	Commit date
LJ Cryer; PG	Katy, TX	Morton Ranch (TX)	6 ft 1 in (1.85 m)	180 lb (82 kg)	Jun 11, 2019
LJ Cryer; PG	Recruit ratings: Rivals: 247Sports: ESPN: (84)				
Dain Dainja; C	Brooklyn Park, MN	Park Center (MN)	6 ft 9 in (2.06 m)	260 lb (120 kg)	Jun 22, 2019
Dain Dainja; C	Recruit ratings: Rivals: 247Sports: ESPN: (86)				
Zach Loveday; C	Gallipolis, OH	Huntington Prep (WV)	7 ft 0 in (2.13 m)	200 lb (91 kg)	Sep 25, 2019
Zach Loveday; C	Recruit ratings: Rivals: 247Sports: ESPN: (80)				
Overall recruit ranking: Rivals: 42 247Sports: 28 ESPN: 22
Note: In many cases, Scout, Rivals, 247Sports, On3, and ESPN may conflict in their listings of height and weight.; In these cases, the average was taken. ESPN grades are on a 100-point scale.; Sources: "Baylor 2020 Basketball Commitments". Rivals.; "2020 Baylor Bears Recruiting Class". ESPN.; "2020 Team Ranking". Rivals.

== Roster ==
2019–20 Baylor Bears men's basketball team
Players
Coaches

Pos.	#	Name	Height	Weight	Year	Previous school	Hometown
F	0	Flo Thamba	6 ft 10 in (2.08 m)	240 lb (109 kg)	So	Mountain Mission	Kinshasa, DR Congo
G	2	Devonte Bandoo	6 ft 3 in (1.91 m)	185 lb (84 kg)	Sr	Hutchinson CC	Mississauga, ON
G/F	5	Jordan Turner (redshirt)	6 ft 7 in (2.01 m)	195 lb (88 kg)	Fr	Sunrise Christian Academy	Houston, TX
G	10	Adam Flagler (redshirt)	6 ft 3 in (1.91 m)	180 lb (82 kg)	So	Presbyterian	Duluth, GA
G/F	11	Mark Vital	6 ft 5 in (1.96 m)	230 lb (104 kg)	RS Jr	Advanced Prep International	Lake Charles, LA
G	12	Jared Butler	6 ft 3 in (1.91 m)	190 lb (86 kg)	So	Riverside Academy	Reserve, LA
G/F	13	Jackson Moffatt (W)	6 ft 6 in (1.98 m)	210 lb (95 kg)	RS Fr	Magnolia	Magnolia, TX
G	15	Obim Okeke	6 ft 0 in (1.83 m)	225 lb (102 kg)	Sr	Bishop Gorman	Las Vegas, NV
F	23	Jonathan Tchamwa Tchatchoua (redshirt)	6 ft 8 in (2.03 m)	245 lb (111 kg)	So	UNLV	Douala, Cameroon
G/F	24	Matthew Mayer	6 ft 9 in (2.06 m)	210 lb (95 kg)	So	Westlake	Austin, TX
F	25	Tristan Clark	6 ft 10 in (2.08 m)	245 lb (111 kg)	Jr	Wagner	San Antonio, TX
G	31	MaCio Teague	6 ft 3 in (1.91 m)	195 lb (88 kg)	RS Jr	UNC Asheville	Cincinnati, OH
F	33	Freddie Gillespie	6 ft 9 in (2.06 m)	245 lb (111 kg)	RS Sr	Carleton	St. Paul, MN
G	45	Davion Mitchell	6 ft 2 in (1.88 m)	195 lb (88 kg)	RS So	Auburn	Hinesville, GA

Head coach

- Scott Drew (Butler)

Assistant coach(es)

- Alvin Brooks III (Idaho State)
- John Jakus (Trinity International)
- Jerome Tang (Charter Oak)

Legend

- (C) Team captain
- (S) Suspended
- (I) Ineligible
- (W) Walk-on
- Injured
- Current redshirt

Roster

== Schedule and results ==
Date time, TV	Rank^{#}	Opponent^{#}	Result	Record	High points	High rebounds	High assists	Site (attendance) city, state
Regular season
November 5, 2019*; 11:00 am, ESPN+	No. 16	Central Arkansas	W 105–61	1–0	30 – Butler	10 – Teague	5 – Butler/Mitchell	Ferrell Center (8,805); Waco, TX
November 8, 2019*; 8:30 pm, ESPN	No. 16	vs. Washington; Armed Forces Classic	L 64–67	1–1	18 – Butler	11 – Gillespie	5 – Teague	Alaska Airlines Center (5,117); Anchorage, AK
November 15, 2019*; 8:00 pm, ESPN+	No. 24	Texas State	W 72–63	2–1	15 – Butler	11 – Gillespie	5 – Teague	Ferrell Center (7,640); Waco, TX
November 21, 2019*; 3:30 pm, ESPN2	No. 24	vs. Ohio; Myrtle Beach Invitational quarterfinal	W 76–53	3–1	19 – Butler	11 – Gillespie	5 – Butler	HTC Center (2,269); Conway, SC
November 22, 2019*; 4:00 pm, ESPNU	No. 24	at Coastal Carolina; Myrtle Beach Invitational semifinal	W 77–65	4–1	21 – Teague	9 – Vital	6 – Mitchell	HTC Center (1,921); Conway, SC
November 24, 2019*; 4:00 pm, ESPN	No. 24	vs. No. 17 Villanova; Myrtle Beach Invitational championship	W 87–78	5–1	22 – Butler	7 – Gillespie	3 – Butler/Vital	HTC Center; Conway, SC
December 3, 2019*; 6:30 pm, ESPN+	No. 18	Maryland Eastern Shore	W 78–46	6–1	20 – Butler	13 – Gillespie	5 – Teague	Ferrell Center (6,195); Waco, TX
December 7, 2019*; 11:00 am, ESPNU	No. 18	No. 12 Arizona	W 63–58	7–1	19 – Teague	13 – Gillespie	3 – Bandoo/Vital	Ferrell Center (7,872); Waco, TX
December 10, 2019*; 8:00 pm, ESPN2	No. 11	No. 18 Butler; Big East/Big 12 Battle	W 53–52	8–1	10 – Tied	9 – Gillespie	3 – Mitchell	Ferrell Center (7,270); Waco, TX
December 18, 2019*; 9:00 pm, ESPNU	No. 10	vs. UT Martin; The Battleground 2K19	W 91–63	9–1	19 – Tied	8 – Thamba	6 – Butler	Toyota Center; Houston, TX
December 30, 2019*; 2:00 pm, ESPN+	No. 6	Jackson State	W 83–57	10–1	18 – Butler	13 – Gillespie	5 – Mitchell	Ferrell Center (6,773); Waco, TX
January 4, 2020; 7:00 pm, ESPN2	No. 6	Texas	W 59–44	11–1 (1–0)	21 – Teague	12 – Gillespie	3 – Mitchell	Ferrell Center (6,063); Waco, TX
January 7, 2020; 8:00 pm, ESPN2	No. 4	at No. 22 Texas Tech	W 57–52	12–1 (2–0)	14 – Mitchell	13 – Vital	2 – Tied	United Supermarkets Arena (15,098); Lubbock, TX
January 11, 2020; 12:00 pm, CBS	No. 4	at No. 3 Kansas	W 67–55	13–1 (3–0)	22 – Butler	7 – Teague	4 – Vital	Allen Fieldhouse (16,300); Lawrence, KS
January 15, 2020; 7:00 pm, ESPN+	No. 2	Iowa State	W 68–55	14–1 (4–0)	19 – Butler	11 – Gillespie	6 – Mitchell	Ferrell Center (8,500); Waco, TX
January 18, 2020; 11:00 am, ESPN2	No. 2	at Oklahoma State	W 75–68	15–1 (5–0)	17 – Tied	5 – Tied	6 – Butler	Gallagher-Iba Arena (7,594); Stillwater, OK
January 20, 2020; 8:00 pm, ESPN	No. 1	Oklahoma	W 61–57	16–1 (6–0)	16 – Teague	15 – Gillespie	5 – Bandoo	Ferrell Center (9,217); Waco, TX
January 25, 2020*; 7:00 pm, ESPN	No. 1	at Florida; Big 12/SEC Challenge	W 72–61	17–1	16 – Tied	10 – Vital	6 – Mitchell	O'Connell Center (11,092); Gainesville, FL
January 29, 2020; 8:00 pm, ESPNU	No. 1	at Iowa State	W 67–53	18–1 (7–0)	15 – Teague	9 – Tied	7 – Vital	Hilton Coliseum (13,896); Ames, IA
February 1, 2020; 3:00 pm, ESPN2	No. 1	TCU	W 68–52	19–1 (8–0)	19 – Teague	11 – Gillespie	4 – Mitchell	Ferrell Center (8,830); Waco, TX
February 3, 2020; 8:00 pm, ESPN2	No. 1	at Kansas State	W 73–67	20–1 (9–0)	20 – Butler	7 – Bandoo	7 – Mitchell	Bramlage Coliseum (8,888); Manhattan, KS
February 8, 2020; 5:00 pm, ESPN2	No. 1	Oklahoma State	W 78–70	21–1 (10–0)	24 – Teague	11 – Gillespie	6 – Butler	Ferrell Center (7,675); Waco, TX
February 10, 2020; 8:00 pm, ESPN	No. 1	at Texas	W 52–45	22–1 (11–0)	11 – Teague	8 – Teague	8 – Mitchell	Frank Erwin Center (9,433); Austin, TX
February 15, 2020; 3:00 pm, ESPN+	No. 1	No. 14 West Virginia	W 70–59	23–1 (12–0)	21 – Butler	8 – Mayer	9 – Mitchell	Ferrell Center (10,305); Waco, TX
February 18, 2020; 8:00 pm, ESPN2	No. 1	at Oklahoma	W 65–54	24–1 (13–0)	22 – Butler	10 – Gillespie	4 – Mitchell	Lloyd Noble Center (10,017); Norman, OK
February 22, 2020; 11:00 am, ESPN	No. 1	No. 3 Kansas; Saturday Primetime	L 61–64	24–2 (13–1)	19 – Butler	8 – Vital	6 – Butler	Ferrell Center (10,627); Waco, TX
February 25, 2020; 7:00 pm, ESPN+	No. 2	Kansas State	W 85–66	25–2 (14–1)	19 – Mayer	11 – Gillespie	10 – Mitchell	Ferrell Center (7,939); Waco, TX
February 29, 2020; 1:00 pm, ESPN	No. 2	at TCU	L 72–75	25–3 (14–2)	18 – Gillespie	17 – Gillespie	4 – Mitchell	Schollmaier Arena (6,549); Fort Worth, TX
March 2, 2020; 8:00 pm, ESPN	No. 4	Texas Tech	W 71–68 ^{OT}	26–3 (15–2)	18 – Bandoo	10 – Gillespie	5 – Mitchell	Ferrell Center (8,953); Waco, TX
March 7, 2020; 12:00 pm, ESPN+	No. 4	at West Virginia	L 64–76	26–4 (15–3)	21 – Butler	12 – Vital	4 – Vital	WVU Coliseum (14,014); Morgantown, WV
Big 12 tournament
Mar 12, 2020; 6:00 pm, ESPN2	(2); No. 5	vs. (10) Kansas State; Quarterfinals	Cancelled due to the COVID-19 pandemic					Sprint Center; Kansas City, MO
*Non-conference game. ^{#}Rankings from AP Poll. (#) Tournament seedings in parentheses. All times are in Central Time.

== Rankings ==
Ranking movements Legend: ██ Increase in ranking ██ Decrease in ranking ( ) = First-place votes
	Week																			
Poll	Pre	1	2	3	4	5	6	7	8	9	10	11	12	13	14	15	16	17	18	Final
AP	16	24	24	19	18	11	10	7	6	4	2 (31)	1 (33)	1 (44)	1 (49)	1 (48)	1 (48)	2 (2)	4	5	5
Coaches	18	18*	23	18	16	11	11	6	4	4	2 (10)	2 (13)	1 (15)	1 (20)	1 (19)	1 (21)	2 (2)	4	5	4

*AP does not release post-NCAA tournament rankings.
