= 2019–20 Big 12 Conference men's basketball season =

2019–20 Big 12 Men's Basketball Season
- League: NCAA Division I
- Sport: Basketball
- Teams: 10
- TV partner(s): CBS, ESPN, FSN

NBA Draft
- Top draft pick: Tyrese Haliburton
- Picked by: 12th, Sacramento Kings

2019–20 NCAA Division I men's basketball season
- 2020 Big 12 Champions: Kansas
- Runners-up: Baylor
- Season MVP: Udoka Azubuike, Kansas
- Top scorer: Devon Dotson, Kansas

Big 12 Tournament

Big 12 Basketball seasons
- ← 2018–19 2020–21 →

2019–20 Big 12 men's basketball standings
| | Conf. | | | | Overall |
| Team | W | | L | PCT | W | | L | PCT |
|---|---|---|---|---|---|---|---|---|
| No. 1 Kansas | 17 | – | 1 | .944 | 28 | – | 3 | .903 |
| No. 5 Baylor | 15 | – | 3 | .833 | 26 | – | 4 | .867 |
| No. 24 West Virginia | 9 | – | 9 | .500 | 21 | – | 10 | .677 |
| Texas | 9 | – | 9 | .500 | 19 | – | 12 | .613 |
| Oklahoma | 9 | – | 9 | .500 | 19 | – | 12 | .613 |
| Texas Tech | 9 | – | 9 | .500 | 18 | – | 13 | .581 |
| TCU | 7 | – | 11 | .389 | 16 | – | 16 | .500 |
| Oklahoma State | 7 | – | 11 | .389 | 18 | – | 14 | .563 |
| Iowa State | 5 | – | 13 | .278 | 12 | – | 20 | .375 |
| Kansas State | 3 | – | 15 | .167 | 11 | – | 21 | .344 |
Note: The 2020 Big 12 Tournament was canceled prior to the quarterfinals due to the COVID-19 pandemic. Rankings from AP poll

The 2019–20 Big 12 men's basketball season began with practices in October 2019, followed by the start of the 2019–20 NCAA Division I men's basketball season in November. Regular season conference play started in December 2019 and concluded in March 2019. The Big 12 tournament was scheduled to be held from March 11 through 14 and will be played at the Sprint Center in Kansas City, Missouri, but it was cancelled after the first round due to the coronavirus pandemic.

== Coaches ==
=== Coaching changes ===
There were no head coaching changes following the 2018–19 Big 12 Conference men's basketball season.

=== Head coaches ===
Note: Stats are through the beginning of the season. All stats and records are from time at current school only.

| Team | Head coach | Previous job | Seasons at school | Overall record | Big 12 record | NCAA Tournaments | NCAA Final Fours | NCAA Championships |
|---|---|---|---|---|---|---|---|---|
| Baylor | Scott Drew | Valparaiso | 16th | 318–208 (.605) | 124–147 (.458) | 8 | 0 | 0 |
| Iowa State | Steve Prohm | Murray State | 5th | 83–53 (.610) | 35–37 (.486) | 3 | 0 | 0 |
| Kansas | Bill Self | Illinois | 17th | 473–106 (.817) | 222–52 (.810) | 16 | 3 | 1 |
| Kansas State | Bruce Weber | Illinois | 8th | 150–89 (.628) | 69–57 (.548) | 5 | 0 | 0 |
| Oklahoma | Lon Kruger | UNLV | 9th | 160–105 (.604) | 72–72 (.500) | 7 | 1 | 0 |
| Oklahoma State | Mike Boynton | Oklahoma State (asst.) | 3rd | 33–35 (.485) | 13–23 (.361) | 0 | 0 | 0 |
| TCU | Jamie Dixon | Pittsburgh | 4th | 68–41 (.624) | 22–32 (.407) | 1 | 0 | 0 |
| Texas | Shaka Smart | VCU | 5th | 71–66 (.518) | 31–41 (.431) | 2 | 0 | 0 |
| Texas Tech | Chris Beard | Little Rock | 4th | 76–31 (.710) | 31–23 (.574) | 2 | 1 | 0 |
| West Virginia | Bob Huggins | Kansas State | 13th | 270–151 (.641) | 66–60 (.524) | 9 | 1 | 0 |

== Preseason ==
Big 12 Preseason Poll

| | Big 12 Coaches | Points |
| 1. | Kansas (8) | 80 |
| 2. | Baylor (1) | 71 |
| 3. | Texas Tech (1) | 62 |
| 4. | Texas | 57 |
| 5. | West Virginia | 45 |
| 6. | Oklahoma State | 42 |
| 7. | Iowa State | 30 |
| 8. | Oklahoma | 29 |
| 9. | Kansas State | 23 |
| 10. | TCU | 11 |
Reference: (#) first place votes

Pre-Season All-Big 12 Team

Big 12 Coaches
Tristan Clark, F Baylor
Tyrese Haliburton, G Iowa State
Udoka Azubuike, F Kansas
Devon Dotson, G Kansas
Desmond Bane, G TCU

- Player of the Year: Udoka Azubuike, Kansas
- Newcomer of the Year: Chris Clarke, Texas Tech
- Freshman of the Year: Oscar Tshiebwe, West Virginia

== Rankings ==
Legend
| Increase in ranking |
| Decrease in ranking |
| Not ranked previous week |

| | | Pre | Wk 2 | Wk 3 | Wk 4 | Wk 5 | Wk 6 | Wk 7 | Wk 8 | Wk 9 | Wk 10 | Wk 11 | Wk 12 | Wk 13 | Wk 14 | Wk 15 | Wk 16 | Wk 17 | Wk 18 | Wk 19 | Wk 20 | Final |
|---|---|---|---|---|---|---|---|---|---|---|---|---|---|---|---|---|---|---|---|---|---|---|
| Baylor | AP | 16 | 24 | 23 | 19 | 18 | 11 | 10 | 7 | 6 | 4 | 2 | 1 | 1 | 1 | 1 | 1 | 2 | 4 | 5 | | |
| Baylor | C | 18 | – | 23 | 18 | 16 | 11 | 11 | 6 | 4 | 4 | 2 | 2 | 1 | 1 | 1 | 1 | 2 | 4 | 5 | | |
| Iowa State | AP | | | | | | | | | | | | | | | | | | | | | |
| Iowa State | C | | – | | | | RV | | | | | | | | | | | | | | | |
| Kansas | AP | 3 | 5 | 4 | 4 | 2 | 2 | 1 | 5 | 3 | 3 | 6 | 3 | 3 | 3 | 3 | 3 | 1 | 1 | 1 | | |
| Kansas | C | 3 | – | 5 | 5 | 3 | 3 | 1 | 5 | 3 | 3 | 7 | 3 | 3 | 3 | 3 | 3 | 1 | 1 | 1 | | |
| Kansas State | AP | | | | | | | | | | | | | | | | | | | | | |
| Kansas State | C | | – | RV | RV | RV | | | | | | | | | | | | | | | | |
| Oklahoma | AP | | | RV | RV | RV | | | | | | | | | | | | | RV | | | |
| Oklahoma | C | RV | – | RV | RV | RV | RV | RV | RV | | | | | | | RV | RV | | | RV | | |
| Oklahoma State | AP | | | | | RV | | RV | | | | | | | | | | | | | | |
| Oklahoma State | C | | – | RV | | 25 | RV | RV | | | | | | | | | | | | | | |
| TCU | AP | | | | | | | | | | | RV | | | | | | | | | | |
| TCU | C | | – | | | | | | | | | RV | | | | | | | | | | |
| Texas | AP | | RV | 22 | RV | | RV | RV | | | | | | | | | | | | | | |
| Texas | C | RV | – | 22 | RV | RV | RV | RV | | | | | | | | | | | | | | |
| Texas Tech | AP | 13 | 11 | 12 | 12 | RV | | 24 | 23 | 22 | 22 | 23 | 18 | RV | RV | 24 | RV | 22 | RV | | | |
| Texas Tech | C | 12 | – | 12 | 12 | RV | RV | 25 | 22 | 22 | 21 | 23 | 18 | RV | RV | 24 | RV | 21 | RV | | | |
| West Virginia | AP | | | RV | | RV | RV | 25 | 22 | 16 | 17 | 12 | 14 | 12 | 13 | 14 | 17 | 20 | RV | 22 | | |
| West Virginia | C | | – | | RV | RV | | RV | 23 | 17 | 17 | 13 | 15 | 11 | 11 | 14 | 18 | 19 | RV | 23 | | |

== Regular season ==
=== Conference matrix ===
| | Baylor | Iowa State | Kansas | Kansas State | Oklahoma | Oklahoma State | TCU | Texas | Texas Tech | West Virginia |
|---|---|---|---|---|---|---|---|---|---|---|
| vs. Baylor | — | 0–2 | 1–1 | 0–2 | 0–2 | 0–2 | 1–1 | 0–2 | 0–2 | 1–1 |
| vs. Iowa State | 2–0 | — | 2–0 | 1–1 | 1–1 | 1–1 | 1–1 | 1–1 | 2–0 | 2–0 |
| vs. Kansas | 1–1 | 0–2 | — | 0–2 | 0–2 | 0–2 | 0–2 | 0–2 | 0–2 | 0–2 |
| vs. Kansas State | 2–0 | 1–1 | 2–0 | — | 1–1 | 2–0 | 2–0 | 2–0 | 2–0 | 1–1 |
| vs. Oklahoma | 2–0 | 1–1 | 2–0 | 1–1 | — | 1–1 | 0–2 | 1–1 | 1–1 | 0–2 |
| vs. Oklahoma State | 2–0 | 1–1 | 2–0 | 0–2 | 1–1 | — | 1–1 | 1–1 | 1–1 | 2–0 |
| vs. TCU | 1–1 | 1–1 | 2–0 | 0–2 | 2–0 | 1–1 | — | 2–0 | 1–1 | 1–1 |
| vs. Texas | 2–0 | 1–1 | 2–0 | 0–2 | 1–1 | 1–1 | 0–2 | — | 1–1 | 1–1 |
| vs. Texas Tech | 2–0 | 0–2 | 2–0 | 0–2 | 1–1 | 1–1 | 1–1 | 1–1 | — | 1–1 |
| vs. West Virginia | 1–1 | 0–2 | 2–0 | 1–1 | 2–0 | 0–2 | 1–1 | 1–1 | 1–1 | — |
| Total | 15–3 | 5–13 | 17–1 | 3–15 | 9–9 | 7–11 | 7–11 | 9–9 | 9–9 | 9–9 |

=== Big12/SEC Challenge ===
| Date | Time | Big 12 team | SEC team | Location | TV | Attendance | Winner | Leader |
|---|---|---|---|---|---|---|---|---|
| Sat., Jan. 25 | 12:00 PM | Iowa State | 16 Auburn | Auburn Arena • Auburn, AL | ESPNU | 9,121 | Auburn (80–76) | SEC (1–0) |
| Sat., Jan. 25 | 12:00 PM | 14 West Virginia | Missouri | WVU Coliseum • Morgantown, WV | ESPN | 14,031 | West Virginia (74–51) | Tied (1–1) |
| Sat., Jan. 25 | 2:00 PM | Texas | LSU | Frank Erwin Center • Austin, TX | ESPN | 11,287 | LSU (69–67) | SEC (2–1) |
| Sat., Jan. 25 | 2:00 PM | Oklahoma | Mississippi State | Chesapeake Energy Arena • Oklahoma City, OK | ESPN2 | 6,442 | Oklahoma (63–62) | Tied (2–2) |
| Sat., Jan. 25 | 4:00 PM | 3 Kansas | Tennessee | Allen Fieldhouse • Lawrence, KS | ESPN | 16,300 | Kansas (74–68) | Big 12 (3–2) |
| Sat., Jan. 25 | 4:00 PM | Oklahoma State | Texas A&M | Reed Arena • College Station, TX | ESPNU | 7,622 | Oklahoma State (73–62) | Big 12 (4–2) |
| Sat., Jan. 25 | 4:00 PM | TCU | Arkansas | Bud Walton Arena • Fayetteville, AR | ESPN2 | 19,200 | Arkansas (78–67) | Big 12 (4–3) |
| Sat., Jan. 25 | 6:00 PM | 18 Texas Tech | 15 Kentucky | United Supermarkets Arena • Lubbock, TX | ESPN | 14,763 | Kentucky (76–74^{OT}) | Tied (4–4) |
| Sat., Jan. 25 | 6:00 PM | Kansas State | Alabama | Coleman Coliseum • Tuscaloosa, AL | ESPN2 | 11,824 | Alabama (77–74) | SEC (5–4) |
| Sat., Jan. 25 | 8:00 PM | 1 Baylor | Florida | O'Connell Center • Gainesville, FL | ESPN | 11,092 | Baylor (72–61) | Tied (5–5) |
Georgia, Ole Miss, South Carolina, and Vanderbilt will not participate for the SEC, instead participating in the SEC/American Alliance. All times Eastern

== Postseason ==
=== Big 12 Tournament ===
All 10 conference teams will participate in the tournament. The top six teams earn a first round bye.

Teams will be seeded by record within the conference, with a tiebreaker system to seed teams with identical conference records.

| Seed | School | Conf | Tiebreaker 1 | Tiebreaker 2 | Tiebreaker 3 | Tiebreaker 4 |
|---|---|---|---|---|---|---|
| 1 | Kansas | 17–1 | | | | |
| 2 | Baylor | 15–3 | | | | |
| 3 | Oklahoma | 9–9 | 4–2 vs. Texas/Texas Tech/West Virginia | | | |
| 4 | Texas | 9–9 | 3–3 vs. Oklahoma/Texas Tech/West Virginia | 0–2 vs. Kansas | 0–2 vs. Baylor | 3–1 vs. TCU/Oklahoma State |
| 5 | Texas Tech | 9–9 | 3–3 vs. Oklahoma/Texas/West Virginia | 0–2 vs. Kansas | 0–2 vs. Baylor | 2–2 vs. TCU/Oklahoma State |
| 6 | West Virginia | 9–9 | 2–4 vs. Oklahoma/Texas/Texas Tech | | | |
| 7 | TCU | 7–11 | 1–1 vs. Oklahoma State | 0–2 vs. Kansas | 1–1 vs. Baylor | |
| 8 | Oklahoma State | 7–11 | 1–1 vs. TCU | 0–2 vs. Kansas | 0–2 vs. Baylor | |
| 9 | Iowa State | 5–13 | | | | |
| 10 | Kansas State | 3–15 | | | | |

=== Bracket ===
First round Wednesday, March 11
8 | Oklahoma State | 72
9 | Iowa State | 71
7 | TCU | 49
10 | Kansas State | 53

Quarterfinals; Thursday, March 12
1 | Kansas
8 | Oklahoma State
4 | Texas
5 | Texas Tech
2 | Baylor
10 | Kansas State
3 | Oklahoma
6 | West Virginia

Semifinals; Friday, March 13

Championship; Saturday, March 14

== Honors and awards ==
=== All-Big 12 awards and teams ===
2019 Big 12 Men's Basketball Individual Awards
| Award | Recipient(s) |
| Player of the Year | Udoka Azubuike, C, Kansas |
| Coach of the Year | Scott Drew, Baylor |
| Defensive Player of the Year | Marcus Garrett, G, Kansas |
| Sixth Man Award | Devonte Bandoo, G, Baylor |
| Newcomer of the Year | Davion Mitchell, G, Baylor |
| Freshman of the Year | Jahmi'us Ramsey, G, Texas Tech |

2020 Big 12 Men's Basketball All-Conference Teams
| First Team | Second Team | Third Team | Defensive Team | Newcomer Team | Freshman Team |
| Jared Butler†, G, Baylor; Udoka Azubuike†, C, Kansas; Devon Dotson†, G, Kansas; Kristian Doolittle, F, Oklahoma; Desmond Bane, G, TCU | MaCio Teague, G, Baylor; Freddie Gillespie, F, Baylor; Tyrese Haliburton, G, Iowa State; Jahmi'us Ramsey, G, Texas Tech; Oscar Tshiebwe, F, West Virginia | Davion Mitchell, G, Baylor; Mark Vital, G/F, Baylor; Marcus Garrett, G, Kansas; Brady Manek, F, Oklahoma; Matt Coleman III, G, Texas | Freddie Gillespie, F, Baylor; Davion Mitchell, G, Baylor; Mark Vital†, G/F, Baylor; Udoka Azubuike, C, Kansas; Marcus Garrett†, G, Kansas | Davion Mitchell†, G, Baylor; MaCio Teague†, G, Baylor; Austin Reaves, G, Oklahoma; Jahmi'us Ramsey, G, Texas Tech; Oscar Tshiebwe, F, West Virginia | Christian Braun, G, Kansas; Jahmi'us Ramsey†, G, Texas Tech; Terrence Shannon Jr., G, Texas Tech; Miles McBride, F, West Virginia; Oscar Tshiebwe†, F, West Virginia |
† - denotes unanimous selection

=== Phillips 66 Big 12 Men’s Basketball Weekly Awards ===
| Week | Player of the Week | School | Newcomer of the Week | School | Ref. |
|---|---|---|---|---|---|
| Nov 11 | Tyrese Haliburton | Iowa State | T. J. Holyfield | Texas Tech | |
| Nov 18 | Kristian Doolittle | Oklahoma | Oscar Tshiebwe | West Virginia | |
| Nov 25 | Jared Butler | Baylor | Jahmi'us Ramsey | Texas Tech | |
| Dec 2 | Devon Dotson | Kansas | Oscar Tshiebwe (2) | West Virginia | |
| Dec 9 | Freddie Gillespie | Baylor | Rasir Bolton | Iowa State | |
| Dec 16 | Devon Dotson (2) | Kansas | Terrence Shannon Jr. | Texas Tech | |
| Dec 23 | Kristian Doolittle (2) | Oklahoma | Chris Clarke | Texas Tech | |
| Dec 30 | Cartier Diarra | Kansas State | Miles McBride | West Virginia | |
| Jan 6 | Tyrese Haliburton (2) | Iowa State | Oscar Tshiebwe (3) | West Virginia | |
| Jan 13 | Jared Butler (2) | Baylor | MaCio Teague; Miles McBride (2) | Baylor; West Virginia | |
| Jan 20 | Kyler Edwards | Texas Tech | Isaiah Moss | Kansas | |
| Jan 27 | Udoka Azubuike | Kansas | Rasir Bolton (2) | Iowa State | |
| Feb 3 | Devon Dotson (3) | Kansas | Jahmi'us Ramsey (2) | Texas Tech | |
| Feb 10 | Udoka Azubuike (2) | Kansas | MaCio Teague (2) | Baylor | |
| Feb 17 | Kristian Doolittle (3) | Oklahoma | Kalib Boone | Oklahoma State | |
| Feb 24 | Udoka Azubuike (3) | Kansas | Jahmi'us Ramsey (3) | Texas Tech | |
| Mar 2 | Desmond Bane; Andrew Jones | TCU; Texas | P. J. Fuller | TCU | |
| Mar 9 | Austin Reaves | Oklahoma | Oscar Tshiebwe (4) | West Virginia | |

== See also ==
- 2019–20 NCAA Division I men's basketball season
- Big 12 Conference
- Big 12/SEC Challenge
