= 2019–20 Texas Tech Red Raiders basketball team =

American college basketball season

2019–20 Texas Tech Red Raiders basketball
- Conference: Big 12 Conference
- Record: 18–13 (9–9 Big 12)
- Head coach: Chris Beard (4th season)
- Assistant coaches: Mark Adams (4th season); Brian Burg (4th season); Ulric Maligi (1st season)
- Home arena: United Supermarkets Arena

2019–20 Big 12 men's basketball standings
	Conf.				Overall
Team	W		L	PCT	W		L	PCT
No. 1 Kansas	17	–	1	.944	28	–	3	.903
No. 5 Baylor	15	–	3	.833	26	–	4	.867
No. 24 West Virginia	9	–	9	.500	21	–	10	.677
Texas	9	–	9	.500	19	–	12	.613
Oklahoma	9	–	9	.500	19	–	12	.613
Texas Tech	9	–	9	.500	18	–	13	.581
TCU	7	–	11	.389	16	–	16	.500
Oklahoma State	7	–	11	.389	18	–	14	.563
Iowa State	5	–	13	.278	12	–	20	.375
Kansas State	3	–	15	.167	11	–	21	.344
Note: The 2020 Big 12 Tournament was canceled prior to the quarterfinals due to the COVID-19 pandemic. Rankings from AP poll

The 2019–20 Texas Tech Red Raiders basketball team represented Texas Tech University in the 2019–20 NCAA Division I men's basketball season as a member of the Big 12 Conference. The Red Raiders were led by fourth-year coach Chris Beard. They played their home games at the United Supermarkets Arena in Lubbock, Texas.

== Previous season ==
They finished the season 31–7, 14–4 in Big 12 play to win the Big 12 regular season title with Kansas State. They lost in the quarterfinals of the Big 12 tournament to West Virginia. They received an at-large bid to the NCAA tournament where they defeated Stephen F. Austin, Buffalo, Michigan and Gonzaga to advance to their first Final Four in school history. In the Final Four they defeated Michigan State to advanced to the National Championship Game, which they were defeated by Virginia in overtime. With 31 wins, they finish with most wins in school history.

== Offseason ==
=== Departures ===
On April 18, 2019 Jarrett Culver announced he would declare for the NBA draft and sign with an agent. On April 18, 2019 Khavon Moore entered his name in the NCAA transfer portal, then on May 16, 2019 announced his decision to transfer to Clemson. On May 11, 2019 Malik Ondigo entered his name in the NCAA transfer portal, then on June 17, 2019 announced his decision to transfer to Rice. On May 15, 2019 Josh Mballa entered his name in the NCAA transfer portal, then on June 7, 2019 announced he was transferring to Buffalo.

Name	Number	Pos.	Height	Weight	Year	Hometown	Reason for departure
Brandone Francis	1	G	6'5"	215	RS Senior	La Romana, Dominican Republic	Graduated
DeShawn Corprew	3	F	6'5"	210	Junior	Norfolk, VA	Dismissed from the team
Malik Ondigo	10	F	6'10"	215	Sophomore	St. Louis, MO	Transferred to Rice
Tariq Owens	11	F	6'10"	215	RS Senior	Odenton, MD	Graduated
Matt Mooney	13	G	6'3"	200	Senior	Wauconda, IL	Graduated
Parker Hicks	20	G	6'6"	210	Sophomore	Decatur, TX	Transferred to Lubbock Christian
Khavon Moore	21	F	6'7"	215	Freshman	Macon, GA	Transferred to Clemson
Jarrett Culver	23	F	6'5"	195	Sophomore	Lubbock, TX	Declared for the NBA draft; selected 6th overall by the Phoenix Suns.
Norense Odiase	32	C	6'8"	250	RS Senior	Crowley, TX	Graduated
Josh Mballa	35	F	6'7"	215	Freshman	Bordeaux, France	Transferred to Buffalo

=== Incoming transfers ===
Texas Tech added three players, Chris Clarke, T. J. Holyfield, and Joel Ntwambe, as transfers. On May 11, 2019, T. J. Holyfield announced he was transferring in from Stephen F. Austin. On May 15, 2019 Chris Clarke announced he was transferring in from Virginia Tech. On May 26, 2019 Joel Ntwambe announced he was transferring in from UNLV.

Name	Number	Pos.	Height	Weight	Year	Hometown	Previous school
Joel Ntambwe	5	F	6'8"	220	Junior	Kinshasa, DR Congo	UNLV
T. J. Holyfield	22	F	6'8"	225	RS Senior	Albuquerque, NM	Stephen F. Austin
Chris Clarke	44	G	6'6"	220	RS Senior	Virginia Beach, VA	Virginia Tech

=== 2019 recruiting class ===
College recruiting
Name	Hometown	School	Height	Weight	Commit date
Clarence Nadolny #43 CG	Montreuil, France	Scotland Performance Institute	6 ft 3 in (1.91 m)	190 lb (86 kg)	Apr 29, 2019
Clarence Nadolny #43 CG	Recruit ratings: Scout: Rivals: 247Sports: ESPN:				
Jahmi'us Ramsey #5 CG	Duncanville, TX	Duncanville High School	6 ft 4 in (1.93 m)	195 lb (88 kg)	Nov 8, 2018
Jahmi'us Ramsey #5 CG	Recruit ratings: Scout: Rivals: 247Sports: ESPN:				
Terrence Shannon Jr. #21 SF	Chicago, IL	IMG Academy	6 ft 6 in (1.98 m)	200 lb (91 kg)	Mar 11, 2019
Terrence Shannon Jr. #21 SF	Recruit ratings: Scout: Rivals: 247Sports: ESPN:				
Tyreek Smith #22 PF	Baton Rouge, LA	Trinity Christian School	6 ft 8 in (2.03 m)	205 lb (93 kg)	May 18, 2019
Tyreek Smith #22 PF	Recruit ratings: Scout: Rivals: 247Sports: ESPN:				
Russel Tchewa #71 C	Douala, Cameroon	Putnam Science Academy	7 ft 0 in (2.13 m)	215 lb (98 kg)	Oct 10, 2018
Russel Tchewa #71 C	Recruit ratings: Scout: Rivals: 247Sports: ESPN:				
Overall recruit ranking:
Note: In many cases, Scout, Rivals, 247Sports, On3, and ESPN may conflict in their listings of height and weight.; In these cases, the average was taken. ESPN grades are on a 100-point scale.; Sources: "2019 Team Ranking". Rivals.

=== 2020 Recruiting class ===
College recruiting (2020)
Name	Hometown	School	Height	Weight	Commit date
Chibuzo Agbo #24 SF	San Diego, CA	St. Augustine High School	6 ft 7 in (2.01 m)	215 lb (98 kg)	Aug 12, 2019
Chibuzo Agbo #24 SF	Recruit ratings: Scout: Rivals: 247Sports: ESPN:				
Overall recruit ranking:
Note: In many cases, Scout, Rivals, 247Sports, On3, and ESPN may conflict in their listings of height and weight.; In these cases, the average was taken. ESPN grades are on a 100-point scale.; Sources: "2020 Team Ranking". Rivals.

== Roster ==
2019–20 Texas Tech Red Raiders men's basketball team
Players
Coaches

Pos.	#	Name	Height	Weight	Year	Previous school	Hometown
G	0	Kyler Edwards	6 ft 4 in (1.93 m)	200 lb (91 kg)	So	Findlay Prep	Arlington, TX
G	1	Terrence Shannon Jr.	6 ft 6 in (1.98 m)	210 lb (95 kg)	Fr	IMG Academy	Chicago, IL
G	2	Clarence Nadolny	6 ft 3 in (1.91 m)	195 lb (88 kg)	Fr	Scotland Performance Institute	Montreuil, France
G	3	Jahmi'us Ramsey	6 ft 4 in (1.93 m)	195 lb (88 kg)	Fr	Duncanville	Arlington, TX
F	5	Joel Ntambwe	6 ft 8 in (2.03 m)	220 lb (100 kg)	Fr	UNLV	Kinshasa, DR Congo
F	10	Tyreek Smith	6 ft 7 in (2.01 m)	215 lb (98 kg)	Fr	Trinity Christian	Baton Rouge, LA
F	12	Andrei Savrasov	6 ft 7 in (2.01 m)	225 lb (102 kg)	RS Fr	BC Zenit	Saint Petersburg, Russia
G	15	Kevin McCullar Jr.	6 ft 6 in (1.98 m)	195 lb (88 kg)	RS Fr	Karen Wagner	San Antonio, TX
F	22	T. J. Holyfield	6 ft 8 in (2.03 m)	225 lb (102 kg)	Sr	Stephen F. Austin	Albuquerque, NM
G	24	Avery Benson (W)	6 ft 4 in (1.93 m)	200 lb (91 kg)	RS So	Southwest Christian Academy	Springdale, AR
G	25	Davide Moretti	6 ft 3 in (1.91 m)	180 lb (82 kg)	Jr	Treviso Basket	Bologna, Italy
G	44	Chris Clarke	6 ft 6 in (1.98 m)	220 lb (100 kg)	Sr	Virginia Tech	Virginia Beach, VA
C	54	Russel Tchewa	7 ft 0 in (2.13 m)	260 lb (118 kg)	Fr	Putnam Science Academy	Douala, Cameroon

Head coach

- Chris Beard (Texas)

Assistant coach(es)

- Mark Adams (Texas Tech)
- Brian Burg (Lake Erie)
- Ulric Maligi (Howard)

Legend

- (C) Team captain
- (S) Suspended
- (I) Ineligible
- (W) Walk-on
- Injured
- Current redshirt

Roster
Last update: November 3, 2019

== Schedule and results ==
Date time, TV	Rank^{#}	Opponent^{#}	Result	Record	High points	High rebounds	High assists	Site (attendance) city, state
Regular season
November 5, 2019*; 7:00 pm, FSSW+	No. 13	Eastern Illinois	W 85–60	1–0	19 – Ramsey	7 – Edwards	3 – Tied	United Supermarkets Arena (15,098); Lubbock, TX
November 9, 2019*; 7:00 pm, FSSW+	No. 13	Bethune–Cookman	W 79–44	2–0	20 – Holyfield	9 – Ramsey	5 – Tied	United Supermarkets Arena (15,098); Lubbock, TX
November 13, 2019*; 7:00 pm, Texas Tech TV	No. 11	Houston Baptist	W 103–74	3–0	25 – Ramsey	7 – Tied	9 – Clarke	Chaparral Center (5,500); Midland, TX
November 21, 2019*; 7:00 pm, FSSW+	No. 12	Tennessee State	W 72–57	4–0	19 – Moretti	12 – Clarke	4 – Clarke	United Supermarkets Arena (12,584); Lubbock, TX
November 24, 2019*; 1:00 pm, FSSW+	No. 12	Long Island	W 96–66	5–0	27 – Ramsey	8 – Clarke	8 – Edwards	United Supermarkets Arena (13,286); Lubbock, TX
November 28, 2019*; 7:00 pm, FS1	No. 12	vs. Iowa; Las Vegas Invitational semifinal	L 61–72	5–1	11 – Clarke	10 – Clarke	5 – Clarke	Orleans Arena; Las Vegas, NV
November 29, 2019*; 9:30 pm, FS1	No. 12	vs. Creighton; Las Vegas Invitational 3rd place game	L 76–83 ^{OT}	5–2	23 – Moretti	8 – Edwards	9 – Clarke	Orleans Arena (N/A); Las Vegas, NV
December 4, 2019*; 7:30 pm, FS1		at DePaul; Big East/Big 12 Battle	L 60–65 ^{OT}	5–3	24 – Shannon Jr.	11 – Clarke	4 – Clarke	Wintrust Arena (5,493); Chicago, Illinois
December 10, 2019*; 6:00 pm, ESPN		vs. No. 1 Louisville; Jimmy V Classic	W 70–57	6–3	18 – Moretti	12 – Clarke	6 – Clarke	Madison Square Garden; New York, NY
December 16, 2019*; 6:00 pm, ESPN2	No. 24	Southern Miss	W 71–65	7–3	18 – Shannon Jr.	11 – Clarke	6 – Clarke	United Supermarkets Arena (12,290); Lubbock, TX
December 21, 2019*; 1:00 pm, FSSW+	No. 24	Texas–Rio Grande Valley	W 68–58	8–3	15 – Ramsey	9 – Tied	4 – Tied	United Supermarkets Arena (13,516); Lubbock, TX
December 29, 2019*; 3:00 pm, FSSW	No. 23	Cal State Bakersfield	W 73–58	9–3	20 – Tied	7 – Tied	9 – Clarke	United Supermarkets Arena (14,055); Lubbock, TX
January 4, 2020; 11:00 am, ESPN2	No. 22	Oklahoma State	W 85–50	10–3 (1–0)	18 – Ramsey	10 – Clarke	5 – Tied	United Supermarkets Arena (14,325); Lubbock, TX
January 7, 2020; 8:00 pm, ESPN2	No. 22	No. 4 Baylor	L 52–57	10–4 (1–1)	20 – Ramsey	7 – Shannon Jr.	4 – Clarke	United Supermarkets Arena (15,098); Lubbock, TX
January 11, 2020; 5:00 pm, ESPN	No. 22	at No. 17 West Virginia	L 54–66	10–5 (1–2)	16 – Moretti	8 – Edwards	7 – Clarke	WVU Coliseum (14,111); Morgantown, WV
January 14, 2020; 7:00 pm, ESPN+	No. 23	at Kansas State	W 77–63	11–5 (2–2)	24 – Edwards	8 – Clarke	4 – Clarke	Bramlage Coliseum (7,327); Manhattan, KS
January 18, 2020; 3:00 pm, ESPNU	No. 23	Iowa State	W 72–52	12–5 (3–2)	22 – Edwards	4 – Tied	4 – Clarke	United Supermarkets Arena (15,096); Lubbock, TX
January 21, 2020; 7:00 pm, ESPN+	No. 18	at TCU	L 54–65	12–6 (3–3)	15 – Ramsey	7 – Clarke	4 – Edwards	Schollmaier Arena (6,966); Fort Worth, TX
January 25, 2020*; 5:00 pm, ESPN	No. 18	No. 15 Kentucky; Big 12/SEC Challenge	L 74–76 ^{OT}	12–7	18 – Edwards	8 – Holyfield	5 – Clarke	United Supermarkets Arena (14,763); Lubbock, TX
January 29, 2020; 7:00 pm, ESPN+		No. 12 West Virginia	W 89–81	13–7 (4–3)	25 – Moretti	7 – Shannon Jr.	7 – Clarke	United Supermarkets Arena (13,586); Lubbock, TX
February 1, 2020; 3:00 pm, ESPN		at No. 3 Kansas	L 75–78	13–8 (4–4)	26 – Ramsey	11 – Shannon Jr.	6 – Edwards	Allen Fieldhouse (16,300); Lawrence, KS
February 4, 2020; 8:00 pm, ESPN2		Oklahoma	W 69–61	14–8 (5–4)	21 – Holyfield	7 – McCullar Jr.	3 – Tied	United Supermarkets Arena (12,224); Lubbock, TX
February 8, 2020; 3:00 pm, ESPN2		at Texas	W 62–57	15–8 (6–4)	18 – Ramsey	8 – Holyfield	4 – Clarke	Frank Erwin Center (12,887); Austin, TX
February 10, 2020; 8:00 pm, ESPN2	No. 24	TCU	W 88–42	16–8 (7–4)	17 – Tied	4 – Tied	5 – Clarke	United Supermarkets Arena (13,050); Lubbock, TX
February 15, 2020; 12:00 pm, CBS	No. 24	at Oklahoma State	L 70–73	16–9 (7–5)	15 – Tied	5 – McCullar Jr.	5 – Moretti	Gallagher-Iba Arena (8,424); Stillwater, OK
February 19, 2020; 8:00 pm, ESPN2		Kansas State	W 69–62	17–9 (8–5)	18 – Moretti	6 – McCullar Jr.	4 – Tied	United Supermarkets Arena (14,695); Lubbock, TX
February 22, 2020; 5:00 pm, ESPNU		at Iowa State	W 87–57	18–9 (9–5)	25 – Ramsey	11 – McCullar Jr.	7 – Ramsey	Hilton Coliseum (14,278); Ames, IA
February 25, 2020; 8:00 pm, ESPN2	No. 22	at Oklahoma	L 51–65	18–10 (9–6)	13 – McCullar Jr.	6 – Clarke	3 – McCullar Jr.	Chesapeake Energy Arena (6,879); Oklahoma City, OK
February 29, 2020; 11:00 am, ESPN	No. 22	Texas	L 58–68	18–11 (9–7)	13 – Ramsey	5 – Shannon Jr.	6 – Ramsey	United Supermarkets Arena (15,098); Lubbock, TX
March 2, 2020; 8:00 pm, ESPN		at No. 4 Baylor	L 68–71 ^{OT}	18–12 (9–8)	13 – Ramsey	8 – Clarke	5 – Clarke	Ferrell Center (8,953); Waco, TX
March 7, 2020; 1:00 pm, ESPN		No. 1 Kansas	L 62–66	18–13 (9–9)	18 – Moretti	8 – McCullar Jr.	5 – Edwards	United Supermarkets Arena (15,098); Lubbock, TX
Big 12 Tournament
Mar 12, 2020; 11:30 am, ESPN2	(5)	vs. (4) Texas; Quarterfinals	Cancelled due to the COVID-19 pandemic					Sprint Center; Kansas City, MO
*Non-conference game. ^{#}Rankings from AP Poll. (#) Tournament seedings in parentheses. All times are in Central Time.

== Rankings ==
Ranking movements Legend: ██ Increase in ranking ██ Decrease in ranking RV = Received votes т = Tied with team above or below
	Week																			
Poll	Pre	1	2	3	4	5	6	7	8	9	10	11	12	13	14	15	16	17	18	Final
AP	13	11	12	12	RV	RV	24	23	22	22	23	18	RV	RV	24	RV	22	RV	RV	RV
Coaches	12	12*	12	12	RV	RV	25-T	22	22	21	23	18	RV	RV	24	RV	21	RV	RV	RV

*AP does not release post-NCAA tournament rankings. No Coaches Poll for Week 1.
