= 2019–20 Kansas Jayhawks men's basketball team =

American college basketball season

2019–20 Kansas Jayhawks men's basketball

Big 12 regular season champions Maui Invitational champions
- Conference: Big 12 Conference

Ranking
- Coaches: No. 1
- AP: No. 1
- Record: 28–3 (17–1 Big 12)
- Head coach: Bill Self (17th season)
- Assistant coaches: Jerrance Howard (7th season); Norm Roberts (9th season); Kurtis Townsend (16th season)
- Home arena: Allen Fieldhouse

2019–20 Big 12 men's basketball standings
	Conf.				Overall
Team	W		L	PCT	W		L	PCT
No. 1 Kansas	17	–	1	.944	28	–	3	.903
No. 5 Baylor	15	–	3	.833	26	–	4	.867
No. 24 West Virginia	9	–	9	.500	21	–	10	.677
Texas	9	–	9	.500	19	–	12	.613
Oklahoma	9	–	9	.500	19	–	12	.613
Texas Tech	9	–	9	.500	18	–	13	.581
TCU	7	–	11	.389	16	–	16	.500
Oklahoma State	7	–	11	.389	18	–	14	.563
Iowa State	5	–	13	.278	12	–	20	.375
Kansas State	3	–	15	.167	11	–	21	.344
Note: The 2020 Big 12 Tournament was canceled prior to the quarterfinals due to the COVID-19 pandemic. Rankings from AP poll

The 2019–20 Kansas Jayhawks men's basketball team represented the University of Kansas in the 2019–20 NCAA Division I men's basketball season, which was the Jayhawks' 122nd basketball season. The Jayhawks, members of the Big 12 Conference, played their home games at Allen Fieldhouse in Lawrence, Kansas. They were led by 17th year Hall of Fame head coach Bill Self.

== Season notes ==
The Jayhawks attempted to rebound from losing six players through the draft and outgoing transfers, including Silvio De Sousa, who had been battling the NCAA regarding his eligibility. De Sousa did state if he wins his appeal regarding the NCAA declaring him ineligible, he would return to Kansas. On May 24, 2019, he won his appeal. Kansas was ranked 3rd in the preseason AP Poll, their 7th consecutive season beginning the season ranked in the top five. Additionally, it was the 201st consecutive poll the Jayhawks have been ranked in, which is the longest active streak in the nation. As of the poll released March 9, 2020, the Jayhawks have extended the streak to 219 consecutive polls ranked. They have not played a game as an unranked team since January 31, 2009. After defeating TCU on March 4, 2020, the Jayhawks clinched their 62nd Regular Season Conference Championship, and their 15th in 16 seasons. It was the first time since the 2009-10 season that KU finished the regular season ranked first in the nation. Additionally, the Jayhawks led the nation in quadrant one wins, went undefeated against unranked teams and only lost games to ranked teams, one each at neutral site, home, and away. The Jayhawks set a team record for combined team GPA with a GPA of 3.21.

=== COVID-19 pandemic impact ===
The 2020 Big 12 men's basketball tournament was cancelled March 12 before the quarterfinals were able to begin; The Jayhawks were scheduled to play Oklahoma State. Later that day, the University of Kansas announced that travel for athletics, as well as all home and away athletic events were suspended. That afternoon, the NCAA cancelled the 2020 NCAA tournament prior to the Big 12 naming an automatic bid. It was the first time in the tournament's history it had been canceled. After the cancellation, the NCAA stated it did not intend to name a national champion.

From a standpoint of a mythical national championship claim that the program has not made, the program finished first in both wire service polls, which in college football (which the NCAA has never held a tournament at the FBS level) is recognised as a "consensus" national championship. Kansas currently recognises the Helms Athletic Foundation rankings released in 1943 of the 1921–22 and 1922–23 teams as national champions.

== Roster changes ==
=== Early draft entrants ===
Beginning with the 2019 draft, players who declare for the NBA draft and are not selected are able to return to their school if they terminate their agreement with their agent. If they are selected, however, all remaining eligibility is forfeited. Below are any players that declared for the draft. Also indicated is if the player chose to remain in the draft. The class given is the class the player was for the 2018–19 season.

Name	Position	Class	Stayed in draft
Dedric Lawson	F	RS Junior	Yes
Quentin Grimes	G	Freshman	No
Devon Dotson	G	Freshman	No
Silvio De Sousa	F	Sophomore	No

=== Recruiting class ===
College recruiting
Name	Hometown	School	Height	Weight	Commit date
Issac McBride; G	Little Rock, AR	Arkansas Baptist	6 ft 1 in (1.85 m)	170 lb (77 kg)	Oct 1, 2018
Issac McBride; G	Recruit ratings: Rivals: 247Sports: ESPN: (81)				
Christian Braun; G	Burlington, KS	Blue Valley Northwest	6 ft 5 in (1.96 m)	175 lb (79 kg)	Nov 14, 2018
Christian Braun; G	Recruit ratings: Rivals: 247Sports: ESPN: (81)				
Tristan Enaruna; F	Almere, Netherlands	Wasatch Academy	6 ft 9 in (2.06 m)	205 lb (93 kg)	May 7, 2019
Tristan Enaruna; F	Recruit ratings: Rivals: 247Sports: ESPN: (83)				
Jalen Wilson; F	Denton, Texas	Guyer	6 ft 8 in (2.03 m)	215 lb (98 kg)	Jun 12, 2019
Jalen Wilson; F	Recruit ratings: Rivals: 247Sports: ESPN: (85)				
Dajuan Harris; G	Columbia, Missouri	Rock Bridge	6 ft 2 in (1.88 m)	160 lb (73 kg)	Jul 16, 2019
Dajuan Harris; G	Recruit ratings: Rivals: 247Sports: ESPN: (81)				
Overall recruiting rankings: 247 Sports: 15 Rivals: 17 ESPN: NR

=== Transfers ===
==== Outgoing ====
Name	Position	Class	New School
Charlie Moore	G	RS Sophomore	DePaul
K. J. Lawson	G	RS Senior	Tulane
Quentin Grimes	G	Freshman	Houston
Garrett Luinstra	G	Freshman	Central Missouri

==== Incoming ====
Name	Position	Class	Old School
Isaiah Moss	Guard	RS Senior	Iowa

=== Left program before playing ===
Name	Position	Class	New School
Issac McBride	G	Freshman	Vanderbilt

=== Walk-ons ===
Name	Position	Class	High school	Home town
Michael Jankovich	Guard	Freshman	Jesuit	Dallas, Texas

== Roster ==
2019–20 Kansas Jayhawks men's basketball team
Players
Coaches

Pos.	#	Name	Height	Weight	Year	Hometown
G	0	Marcus Garrett	6 ft 5 in (1.96 m)	195 lb (88 kg)	Jr	Dallas, TX
G	1	Devon Dotson	6 ft 2 in (1.88 m)	185 lb (84 kg)	So	Charlotte, NC
G	2	Christian Braun	6 ft 6 in (1.98 m)	205 lb (93 kg)	Fr	Burlington, KS
G	3	Dajuan Harris (I)	6 ft 1 in (1.85 m)	160 lb (73 kg)	Fr	Columbia, MO
G	4	Isaiah Moss	6 ft 5 in (1.96 m)	208 lb (94 kg)	RS Sr	Chicago, IL
G	5	Elijah Elliott (W)	6 ft 3 in (1.91 m)	185 lb (84 kg)	RS Fr	Southlake, TX
F	10	Jalen Wilson (injured) (redshirt)	6 ft 8 in (2.03 m)	215 lb (98 kg)	Fr	Denton, TX
G	12	Chris Teahan	6 ft 4 in (1.93 m)	195 lb (88 kg)	Jr	Leawood, KS
G/F	13	Tristan Enaruna	6 ft 8 in (2.03 m)	200 lb (91 kg)	Fr	Almere, Netherlands
G	20	Michael Jankovich (W)	6 ft 5 in (1.96 m)	185 lb (84 kg)	Fr	Dallas, TX
F	22	Silvio De Sousa	6 ft 9 in (2.06 m)	245 lb (111 kg)	Jr	Luanda, Angola
G	30	Ochai Agbaji	6 ft 5 in (1.96 m)	210 lb (95 kg)	So	Kansas City, MO
C	33	David McCormack	6 ft 10 in (2.08 m)	265 lb (120 kg)	So	Norfolk, VA
C	35	Udoka Azubuike	7 ft 0 in (2.13 m)	270 lb (122 kg)	Sr	Delta, Nigeria
F	44	Mitch Lightfoot (redshirt)	6 ft 8 in (2.03 m)	225 lb (102 kg)	Sr	Gilbert, AZ

Head coach

- Bill Self (Oklahoma State)

Assistant coach(es)

- Norm Roberts (Queens (NY))
- Kurtis Townsend (Western Kentucky)
- Jerrance Howard (Illinois)

Legend

- (C) Team captain
- (S) Suspended
- (I) Ineligible
- (W) Walk-on
- Injured
- Current redshirt

Roster
Last update: March 9, 2020

== Schedule and results ==
Date time, TV	Rank^{#}	Opponent^{#}	Result	Record	High points	High rebounds	High assists	Site (attendance) city, state
Exhibition
October 24, 2019*; 7:00 pm, ESPN+	No. 3	Fort Hays State	W 86–56	–	21 – Agbaji	8 – Tied	5 – Garrett	Allen Fieldhouse (16,300); Lawrence, KS
October 31, 2019*; 7:00 pm, ESPN+	No. 3	Pittsburg State	W 102–42	–	19 – Agbaji	12 – Azubuike	6 – Agbaji	Allen Fieldhouse (16,300); Lawrence, KS
Regular Season
November 5, 2019*; 6:00 pm, ESPN	No. 3	vs. No. 4 Duke; Champions Classic	L 66–68	0–1	17 – Dotson	13 – McCormack	5 – Garrett	Madison Square Garden (19,812); New York, NY
November 8, 2019*; 8:00 pm, ESPNU	No. 3	UNC Greensboro	W 74–62	1–1	22 – Dotson	10 – Azubuike	6 – Dotson	Allen Fieldhouse (16,300); Lawrence, KS
November 15, 2019*; 7:00 pm, ESPN+	No. 5	Monmouth	W 112–57	2–1	21 – Moss	11 – McCormack	4 – Dotson	Allen Fieldhouse (16,300); Lawrence, KS
November 19, 2019*; 7:00 pm, ESPN+	No. 4	East Tennessee State; Maui Invitational campus game	W 75–63	3–1	21 – Azubuike	7 – Azubuike	6 – Dotson	Allen Fieldhouse (16,300); Lawrence, KS
November 25, 2019*; 8:00 pm, ESPNU	No. 4	vs. Chaminade; Maui Invitational Quarterfinals	W 93–65	4–1	19 – Dotson	7 – Azubuike	7 – Garrett	Lahaina Civic Center (2,400); Lahaina, HI
November 26, 2019*; 9:30 pm, ESPN	No. 4	vs. BYU; Maui Invitational Semifinals	W 71–56	5–1	16 – McCormack	10 – Azubuike	8 – Dotson	Lahaina Civic Center (2,400); Lahaina, HI
November 27, 2019*; 4:00 pm, ESPN	No. 4	vs. Dayton; Maui Invitational Championship	W 90–84 ^{OT}	6–1	31 – Dotson	7 – Garrett	4 – Tied	Lahaina Civic Center (2,400); Lahaina, HI
December 7, 2019*; 6:00 pm, ESPN2	No. 2	No. 20 Colorado	W 72–58	7–1	20 – Agbaji	12 – Agbaji	6 – Tied	Allen Fieldhouse (16,300); Lawrence, KS
December 10, 2019*; 7:00 pm, ESPN+	No. 2	Milwaukee	W 95–68	8–1	22 – Tied	17 – Azubuike	9 – Dotson	Allen Fieldhouse (16,300); Lawrence, KS
December 14, 2019*; 4:00 pm, ESPN+	No. 2	Kansas City; Jayhawk Shootout	W 98–57	9–1	28 – McCormack	7 – Tied	4 – Tied	Sprint Center (17,702); Kansas City, MO
December 21, 2019*; 11:00 am, FOX	No. 1	at No. 18 Villanova; Big 12/Big East Alliance	L 55–56	9–2	15 – Dotson	11 – Azubuike	4 – Tied	Wells Fargo Center (20,706); Philadelphia, PA
December 29, 2019*; 2:00 pm, ABC	No. 5	at Stanford	W 72–56	10–2	17 – Moss	13 – Azubuike	4 – Garrett	Maples Pavilion (6,582); Stanford, CA
January 4, 2020; 3:00 pm, ESPN+	No. 3	No. 16 West Virginia	W 60–53	11–2 (1–0)	17 – Azubuike	11 – Azubuike	6 – Garrett	Allen Fieldhouse (16,300); Lawrence, KS
January 8, 2020; 7:00 pm, ESPN+	No. 3	at Iowa State	W 79–53	12–2 (2–0)	20 – Dotson	7 – Tied	6 – Dotson	Hilton Coliseum (14,384); Ames, IA
January 11, 2020; 12:00 pm, CBS	No. 3	No. 4 Baylor	L 55–67	12–3 (2–1)	15 – Moss	11 – Azubuike	4 – Garrett	Allen Fieldhouse (16,300); Lawrence, KS
January 14, 2020; 8:00 pm, ESPN	No. 6	at Oklahoma	W 66–52	13–3 (3–1)	20 – Moss	14 – Azubuike	5 – Garrett	Lloyd Noble Center (10,486); Norman, OK
January 18, 2020; 1:00 pm, ESPN	No. 6	at Texas	W 66–57	14–3 (4–1)	21 – Dotson	9 – Azubuike	7 – Garrett	Frank Erwin Center (11,762); Austin, TX
January 21, 2020; 6:00 pm, ESPN2	No. 3	Kansas State; Sunflower Showdown	W 81–60	15–3 (5–1)	20 – Braun	14 – Azubuike	5 – Garrett	Allen Fieldhouse (16,300); Lawrence, KS
January 25, 2020*; 3:00 pm, ESPN	No. 3	Tennessee; Big 12/SEC Challenge	W 74–68	16–3	22 – Dotson	11 – Azubuike	7 – Dotson	Allen Fieldhouse (16,300); Lawrence, KS
January 27, 2020; 8:00 pm, ESPN2	No. 3	at Oklahoma State	W 65–50	17–3 (6–1)	16 – Braun	9 – Braun	9 – Garrett	Gallagher-Iba Arena (8,818); Stillwater, OK
February 1, 2020; 3:00 pm, ESPN	No. 3	Texas Tech	W 78–75	18–3 (7–1)	21 – Dotson	8 – Azubuike	3 – Tied	Allen Fieldhouse (16,300); Lawrence, KS
February 3, 2020; 8:00 pm, ESPN	No. 3	Texas	W 69–58	19–3 (8–1)	17 – Azubuike	12 – Azubuike	4 – Garrett	Allen Fieldhouse (16,300); Lawrence, KS
February 8, 2020; 11:00 am, ESPN2	No. 3	at TCU	W 60–46	20–3 (9–1)	20 – Azubuike	14 – Azubuike	11 – Dotson	Schollmaier Arena (6,728); Fort Worth, TX
February 12, 2020; 6:00 pm, ESPN+	No. 3	at No. 14 West Virginia	W 58–49	21–3 (10–1)	15 – Dotson	7 – Tied	4 – Garrett	WVU Coliseum (14,212); Morgantown, WV
February 15, 2020; 11:00 am, ESPN	No. 3	Oklahoma	W 87–70	22–3 (11–1)	24 – Garrett	17 – Azubuike	7 – Garrett	Allen Fieldhouse (16,300); Lawrence, KS
February 17, 2020; 8:00 pm, ESPN	No. 3	Iowa State	W 91–71	23–3 (12–1)	29 – Dotson	8 – Garrett	6 – Garrett	Allen Fieldhouse (16,300); Lawrence, KS
February 22, 2020; 11:00 am, ESPN	No. 3	at No. 1 Baylor	W 64–61	24–3 (13–1)	23 – Azubuike	19 – Azubuike	7 – Garrett	Ferrell Center (10,627); Waco, TX
February 24, 2020; 8:00 pm, ESPN	No. 1	Oklahoma State	W 83–58	25–3 (14–1)	19 – Azubuike	16 – Azubuike	7 – Garrett	Allen Fieldhouse (16,300); Lawrence, KS
February 29, 2020; 12:30 pm, CBS	No. 1	at Kansas State; Sunflower Showdown	W 62–58	26–3 (15–1)	25 – Dotson	9 – Azubuike	3 – Garrett	Bramlage Coliseum (9,003); Manhattan, KS
March 4, 2020; 7:00 pm, ESPN+	No. 1	TCU	W 75–66	27–3 (16–1)	31 – Azubuike	14 – Azubuike	5 – Garrett	Allen Fieldhouse (16,300); Lawrence, KS
March 7, 2020; 1:00 pm, ESPN	No. 1	at Texas Tech	W 66–62	28–3 (17–1)	17 – Dotson	11 – Azubuike	5 – Dotson	United Supermarkets Arena (15,098); Lubbock, TX
Big 12 Tournament
March 12, 2020; 1:30 pm, TBD	(1) No. 1	vs. (8) Oklahoma State; Quarterfinals	Tournament cancelled after first round due to the COVID-19 pandemic. NCAA Tournament cancelled as well.					Sprint Center; Kansas City, MO
*Non-conference game. ^{#}Rankings from AP Poll. (#) Tournament seedings in parentheses. All times are in Central Time.

== Rankings ==
Ranking movements Legend: ██ Increase in ranking ██ Decrease in ranking ( ) = First-place votes
	Week																			
Poll	Pre	1	2	3	4	5	6	7	8	9	10	11	12	13	14	15	16	17	18	Final
AP	3 (3)	5	4	4	2 (3)	2 (4)	1 (47)	5	3 (1)	3 (2)	6	3 (1)	3 (1)	3 (1)	3 (1)	3 (1)	1 (62)	1 (64)	1 (65)	1 (63)
Coaches	3 (1)	3*	5 (1)	5	3 (1)	3	1 (25)	5	3 (1)	3 (1)	7	3	3 (1)	3	3	3	1 (30)	1 (32)	1 (32)	1 (29)

*No coaches poll for week 1
