= 2021–22 Baylor Bears men's basketball team =

American college basketball season

2021–22 Baylor Bears men's basketball

Big 12 regular season co-champions Battle 4 Atlantis champions

NCAA tournament, Second Round
- Conference: Big 12 Conference

Ranking
- Coaches: No. 9
- AP: No. 4
- Record: 27–7 (14–4 Big 12)
- Head coach: Scott Drew (19th season)
- Associate head coach: Jerome Tang (19th season)
- Assistant coaches: Alvin Brooks III (6th season); John Jakus (5th season)
- Offensive scheme: Motion
- Base defense: No-Middle
- Home arena: Ferrell Center

2021–22 Big 12 men's basketball standings
	Conf.				Overall
Team	W		L	PCT	W		L	PCT
No. 3 Kansas †	14	–	4	.778	34	–	6	.850
No. 4 Baylor	14	–	4	.778	27	–	7	.794
No. 12 Texas Tech	12	–	6	.667	27	–	10	.730
No. 25 Texas	10	–	8	.556	22	–	12	.647
TCU	8	–	10	.444	21	–	13	.618
Oklahoma State*	8	–	10	.444	15	–	15	.500
Iowa State	7	–	11	.389	22	–	13	.629
Oklahoma	7	–	11	.389	19	–	16	.543
Kansas State	6	–	12	.333	14	–	17	.452
West Virginia	4	–	14	.222	16	–	17	.485
† 2022 Big 12 Tournament winner *Oklahoma State was ineligible for both the 2022 Big 12 Tournament and the 2022 NCAA tournament due to postseason ban imposed by the NCAA. Rankings from AP poll

The 2021–22 Baylor Bears men's basketball team represented Baylor University in the 2021–22 NCAA Division I men's basketball season, which was the Bears' 116th basketball season. The Bears, members of the Big 12 Conference, played their home games at the Ferrell Center in Waco, Texas. They were led by 19th-year head coach Scott Drew. They finished the season 27–7, 14–4 in Big 12 Play to finish a tie for the regular season championship. They lost in the quarterfinals of the Big 12 tournament to Oklahoma. They received an at-large bid to the NCAA tournament as the No. 1 seed in the East Region, where they defeated Norfolk State in the First Round before getting upset in the Second Round by North Carolina.

This was the first season in which the terms "men's" and "women's" are needed to distinguish Baylor's basketball teams. Before this season, Baylor women's basketball had used the nickname "Lady Bears", but on September 3, 2021, the school announced that basketball, soccer, and volleyball, the last three Baylor women's sports still using "Lady", would use only "Bears" from that point forward.

== Previous season ==
In a season limited due to the ongoing COVID-19 pandemic, the Bears finished the 2020–21 season 28–2, 13–1 in Big 12 play to win the regular season championship. In the Big 12 tournament, they defeated Kansas State in the quarterfinals before losing to Oklahoma State in the semifinals. They received an at-large bid to the NCAA tournament as the No. 1 seed in the South region. The Bears defeated Hartford and Wisconsin to advance to the Sweet Sixteen. They defeated Villanova and Arkansas to advance to the school's first Final Four since 1950. In the Final Four, they defeated Houston to advance to the school's first national championship game. In the championship, they defeated No. 1 overall seed Gonzaga to win the school's first national championship.

== Offseason ==
=== Departures ===
All players listed as "graduated" had the option to return in 2021–22. The NCAA ruled that the 2020–21 season, dramatically impacted by COVID-19, would not count against the eligibility of any basketball player. Also, declaration for the NBA draft does not necessarily lead to loss of college eligibility. Junior guard Mathew Mayer declared for the NBA draft, but withdrew his name from consideration and returned to Baylor.

Baylor Departures
Name	Number	Pos.	Height	Weight	Year	Hometown	Reason for Departure
Mark Vital	11	F/G	6'5"	250	(redshirt) Senior	Lake Charles, LA	Graduated, declared for NBA draft
Jared Butler	12	G	6'3"	195	Junior	Reserve, LA	Declared for NBA draft
MaCio Teague	31	G	6'4"	195	(redshirt) Senior	Cincinnati, OH	Graduated, declared for NBA draft
Mark Paterson	35	G	6'1"	180	Graduate Student	Dallas, TX	Graduated
Davion Mitchell	45	G	6'2"	205	(redshirt) Junior	Hinesville, GA	Declared for NBA draft

=== 2021 recruiting class ===
College recruiting information
Name	Hometown	School	Height	Weight	Commit date
Langston Love; SG	Universal City, TX	Montverde Academy (FL)	6 ft 4 in (1.93 m)	188 lb (85 kg)	Jul 15, 2020
Langston Love; SG	Recruit ratings: Rivals: 247Sports: ESPN: (89)				
Jeremy Sochan; PF	Milton Keynes, EN	OrangeAcademy (GE)	6 ft 8 in (2.03 m)	217 lb (98 kg)	Jul 16, 2020
Jeremy Sochan; PF	Recruit ratings: Rivals: 247Sports: ESPN: (75)				
Kendall Brown; SF	Cottage Grove, MN	Sunrise Christian Academy (KS)	6 ft 8 in (2.03 m)	205 lb (93 kg)	Jul 20, 2020
Kendall Brown; SF	Recruit ratings: Rivals: 247Sports: ESPN: (92)				
Overall recruit ranking: Rivals: 14 247Sports: 10
Note: In many cases, Scout, Rivals, 247Sports, On3, and ESPN may conflict in their listings of height and weight.; In these cases, the average was taken. ESPN grades are on a 100-point scale.; Sources: "Baylor 2021 Basketball Commitments". Rivals.; "2021 Baylor Bears Recruiting Class". ESPN.; "2021 Team Ranking". Rivals.

== Roster ==
2021–22 Baylor Bears men's basketball team
Players
Coaches

Pos.	#	Name	Height	Weight	Year	Previous school	Hometown
F	0	Flo Thamba	6 ft 10 in (2.08 m)	245 lb (111 kg)	Sr	Mountain Mission (VA)	Kinshasa, DR Congo
F	1	Jeremy Sochan	6 ft 9 in (2.06 m)	230 lb (104 kg)	Fr	OrangeAcademy (GE)	Milton Keynes, EN
G/F	2	Kendall Brown	6 ft 8 in (2.03 m)	205 lb (93 kg)	Fr	Sunrise Christian Academy (KS)	Cottage Grove, MN
G	3	Dale Bonner	6 ft 2 in (1.88 m)	170 lb (77 kg)	Jr	Shaker Heights; Fairmont State	Shaker Heights, OH
G	4	LJ Cryer	6 ft 1 in (1.85 m)	185 lb (84 kg)	So	Morton Ranch	Katy, TX
G/F	5	Jordan Turner	6 ft 8 in (2.03 m)	195 lb (88 kg)	RS So	Sunrise Christian Academy (KS)	Houston, TX
G	10	Adam Flagler	6 ft 3 in (1.91 m)	180 lb (82 kg)	RS Jr	Presbyterian	Duluth, GA
G	11	James Akinjo	6 ft 1 in (1.85 m)	190 lb (86 kg)	Sr	Arizona	Oakland, CA
G	13	Langston Love (injured) (redshirt)	6 ft 5 in (1.96 m)	210 lb (95 kg)	Fr	Montverde Academy (FL)	Universal City, TX
G	14	Mitchell Paul (W)	6 ft 0 in (1.83 m)	175 lb (79 kg)	Sr	Kansas City Christian	Leawood, KS
F	20	Austin Sacks (W)	6 ft 7 in (2.01 m)	200 lb (91 kg)	So	Oakwood; Santa Clara	Encino, CA
G	21	Kijana Love (W)	6 ft 1 in (1.85 m)	170 lb (77 kg)	Sr	St. Edward's	Universal City, TX
F	23	Jonathan Tchamwa Tchatchoua (injured)	6 ft 8 in (2.03 m)	245 lb (111 kg)	RS Jr	UNLV	Douala, Cameroon
G/F	24	Matthew Mayer	6 ft 9 in (2.06 m)	225 lb (102 kg)	Sr	Westlake	Austin, TX
F	32	Zach Loveday	7 ft 0 in (2.13 m)	215 lb (98 kg)	So	Huntington Prep (WV)	Gallipolis, OH
F	42	Dain Dainja (T)	6 ft 9 in (2.06 m)	270 lb (122 kg)	RS Fr	Park Center	Brooklyn Park, MN

Head coach

- Scott Drew (Butler)

Assistant coach(es)

- Jerome Tang (Charter Oak)
- Alvin Brooks III (Idaho State)
- John Jakus (Trinity International)

Legend

- (C) Team captain
- (S) Suspended
- (I) Ineligible
- (W) Walk-on
- Injured
- Current redshirt

Roster
Last update: November 27, 2021

== Schedule and results ==
Date time, TV	Rank^{#}	Opponent^{#}	Result	Record	High points	High rebounds	High assists	Site (attendance) city, state
Regular Season
November 12, 2021*; 7:30 p.m., ESPN+	No. 8	Incarnate Word	W 87–60	1–0	14 – Mayer	10 – Tchamwa Tchatchoua	6 – Akinjo	Ferrell Center (8,895); Waco, TX
November 15, 2021*; 11:00 a.m., ESPN+	No. 9	Nicholls	W 89–60	2–0	20 – Cryer	9 – Brown	10 – Brown	Ferrell Center (9,307); Waco, TX
November 17, 2021*; 7:00 p.m., ESPN+	No. 9	Central Arkansas	W 92–47	3–0	20 – Cryer	12 – Sochan	10 – Akinjo	Ferrell Center (6,667); Waco, TX
November 20, 2021*; 12:00 p.m., ESPN+	No. 9	Stanford	W 86–48	4–0	21 – Cryer	7 – Tchamwa Tchatchoua	11 – Akinjo	Ferrell Center (7,048); Waco, TX
November 24, 2021*; 6:30 p.m., ESPN2	No. 6	vs. Arizona State; Battle 4 Atlantis quarterfinal	W 75–63	5–0	15 – Cryer	9 – Sochan	7 – Akinjo	Imperial Arena (843); Paradise Island, Bahamas
November 25, 2021*; 4:00 p.m., ESPN	No. 6	vs. VCU; Battle 4 Atlantis semifinal	W 69–61	6–0	15 – Mayer	8 – Tchamwa Tchatchoua	2 – Tied	Imperial Arena (929); Paradise Island, Bahamas
November 26, 2021*; 10:00 a.m., ESPN	No. 6	vs. Michigan State; Battle 4 Atlantis championship	W 75–58	7–0	15 – Akinjo	7 – Mayer	5 – Tied	Imperial Arena (1,305); Paradise Island, Bahamas
December 4, 2021*; 4:00 p.m., ESPN+	No. 4	Arkansas–Pine Bluff	W 99–54	8–0	20 – Cryer	13 – Tchamwa Tchatchoua	3 – Akinjo	Ferrell Center (6,207); Waco, TX
December 12, 2021*; 2:00 p.m., ABC	No. 2	No. 6 Villanova; Big East–Big 12 Battle	W 57–36	9–0	16 – Akinjo	10 – Sochan	5 – Tied	Ferrell Center (10,264); Waco, TX
December 18, 2021*; 9:00 p.m., ESPN2	No. 1	at Oregon	W 78–70	10–0	17 – Brown	7 – Tchamwa Tchatchoua	6 – Akinjo	Matthew Knight Arena (7,682); Eugene, OR
December 20, 2021*; 6:00 p.m., ESPN+	No. 1	Alcorn State	W 94–57	11–0	16 – Tied	9 – Tchamwa Tchatchoua	7 – Tied	Ferrell Center (6,923); Waco, TX
December 28, 2021*; 7:00 p.m., ESPN+	No. 1	Northwestern State	W 104–68	12–0	27 – Akinjo	11 – Sochan	11 – Flagler	Ferrell Center (6,516); Waco, TX
January 1, 2022; 1:00 p.m., ESPNU	No. 1	at No. 8 Iowa State	W 77–72	13–0 (1–0)	16 – Akinjo	7 – Sochan	4 – Flagler	Hilton Coliseum (14,267); Ames, IA
January 4, 2022; 6:00 p.m., ESPN2	No. 1	Oklahoma	W 84–74	14–0 (2–0)	27 – Akinjo	6 – Tied	5 – Akinjo	Ferrell Center (7,523); Waco, TX
January 8, 2022; 4:00 p.m., ESPN+	No. 1	at TCU	W 76–64	15–0 (3–0)	22 – Flagler	6 – Mayer	8 – Akinjo	Schollmaier Arena (5,562); Fort Worth, TX
January 11, 2022; 6:00 p.m., ESPN2	No. 1	No. 19 Texas Tech	L 62–65	15–1 (3–1)	17 – Tied	10 – Tchamwa Tchatchoua	6 – Brown	Ferrell Center (8,569); Waco, TX
January 15, 2022; 4:00 p.m., ESPN	No. 1	Oklahoma State	L 54–61	15–2 (3–2)	18 – Cryer	8 – Tchamwa Tchatchoua	3 – Brown	Ferrell Center (8,861); Waco, TX
January 18, 2022; 4:00 p.m., ESPN2	No. 5	at West Virginia	W 77–68	16–2 (4–2)	25 – Cryer	8 – Thamba	7 – Flager	WVU Coliseum (12,692); Morgantown, WV
January 22, 2022; 2:00 p.m., ESPN+	No. 5	at Oklahoma	W 65–51	17–2 (5–2)	16 – Flagler	10 – Thamba	4 – Akinjo	Lloyd Noble Center (11,339); Norman, OK
January 25, 2022; 7:00 p.m., ESPN+	No. 4	Kansas State	W 74–49	18–2 (6–2)	14 – Cryer	12 – Tchamwa Tchatchoua	5 – Flager	Ferrell Center (8,062); Waco, TX
January 29, 2022*; 3:00 p.m., ESPN	No. 4	at Alabama; Big 12/SEC Challenge	L 78–87	18–3	17 – Sochan	8 – Sochan	7 – Akinjo	Coleman Coliseum (14,474); Tuscaloosa, AL
January 31, 2022; 8:00 p.m., ESPN	No. 8	West Virginia	W 81–77	19–3 (7–2)	25 – Akinjo	9 – Sochan	4 – Tied	Ferrell Center (8,226); Waco, TX
February 5, 2022; 3:00 p.m., ESPN	No. 8	at No. 10 Kansas	L 59–83	19–4 (7–3)	16 – Flagler	8 – Brown	3 – Tied	Allen Fieldhouse (16,300); Lawrence, KS
February 9, 2022; 7:00 p.m., ESPN+	No. 10	at Kansas State	W 75–60	20–4 (8–3)	21 – Tchamwa Tchatchoua	7 – Sochan	8 – Akinjo	Bramlage Coliseum (6,236); Manhattan, KS
February 12, 2022; 11:00 a.m., ESPN2	No. 10	No. 20 Texas	W 80–63	21–4 (9–3)	20 – Flagler	11 – Thamba	7 – Akinjo	Ferrell Center (10,284); Waco, TX
February 16, 2022; 8:00 p.m., ESPN2	No. 7	at No. 11 Texas Tech	L 73–83	21–5 (9–4)	18 – Akinjo	10 – Sochan	7 – Akinjo	United Supermarkets Arena (14,923); Lubbock, TX
February 19, 2022; 1:00 p.m., ESPN2	No. 7	TCU	W 72–62	22–5 (10–4)	17 – Sochan	8 – Thamba	8 – Akinjo	Ferrell Center (10,072); Waco, TX
February 21, 2022; 8:00 p.m., ESPN	No. 10	at Oklahoma State	W 66–64 ^{OT}	23–5 (11–4)	29 – Flagler	7 – Tied	4 – Akinjo	Gallagher-Iba Arena (8,701); Stillwater, OK
February 26, 2022; 7:00 p.m., ESPN	No. 10	No. 5 Kansas	W 80–70	24–5 (12–4)	18 – Thamba	12 – Mayer	6 – Akinjo	Ferrell Center (10,628); Waco, TX
February 28, 2022; 8:00 p.m., ESPN	No. 3	at No. 21 Texas	W 68–61	25–5 (13–4)	19 – 2 tied	8 – Akinjo	7 – Akinjo	Frank Erwin Center (16,450); Austin, TX
March 5, 2022; 5:00 p.m., ESPN2	No. 3	Iowa State	W 75–68	26–5 (14–4)	20 – Akinjo	10 – Brown	6 – Akinjo	Ferrell Center (9,385); Waco, TX
Big 12 Tournament
March 10, 2022; 6:00 p.m., ESPN2	(2) No. 3	vs. (7) Oklahoma; Quarterfinals	L 67–72	26–6	16 – Akinjo	9 – Sochan	4 – Flagler	T-Mobile Center (15,805); Kansas City, MO
NCAA tournament
March 17, 2022; 1:00 p.m., TBS	(1 E) No. 4	vs. (16 E) Norfolk State; First Round	W 85–49	27–6	22 – Mayer	7 – Sochan	9 – Akinjo	Dickies Arena; Fort Worth, TX
March 19, 2022; 11:10 a.m., CBS	(1 E) No. 4	vs. (8 E) North Carolina; Second Round	L 86–93 ^{OT}	27–7	27 – Flagler	11 – Sochan	5 – Akinjo	Dickies Arena (13,300); Fort Worth, TX
*Non-conference game. ^{#}Rankings from AP Poll. (#) Tournament seedings in parentheses. All times are in Central Time.

== Rankings ==
Ranking movements Legend: ██ Increase in ranking ██ Decrease in ranking ( ) = First-place votes
	Week																		
Poll	Pre	1	2	3	4	5	6	7	8	9	10	11	12	13	14	15	16	17	Final
AP	8	9	6	4	2	1 (61)	1 (60)	1 (61)	1 (61)	5	4	8	10	7	10	3 (4)	3 (3)	4	Not released
Coaches	8	8^	5	4 (1)	2 (3)	1 (30)	1 (32)	1 (32)	1 (32)	6	4	8	10	8	11	4 (1)	3 (2)	4	9

*AP does not release post-NCAA Tournament rankings.
^Coaches did not release a week 1 poll.
