= 2021–22 Big 12 Conference men's basketball season =

2021–22 Big 12 Men's Basketball Season
- League: NCAA Division I
- Sport: Basketball
- Teams: 10
- TV partner(s): CBS, ESPN

Big 12 tournament

Big 12 Basketball seasons
- ← 2020–21 2022–23 →

2021–22 Big 12 men's basketball standings
| | Conf. | | | | Overall |
| Team | W | | L | PCT | W | | L | PCT |
|---|---|---|---|---|---|---|---|---|
| No. 3 Kansas † | 14 | – | 4 | .778 | 34 | – | 6 | .850 |
| No. 4 Baylor | 14 | – | 4 | .778 | 27 | – | 7 | .794 |
| No. 12 Texas Tech | 12 | – | 6 | .667 | 27 | – | 10 | .730 |
| No. 25 Texas | 10 | – | 8 | .556 | 22 | – | 12 | .647 |
| TCU | 8 | – | 10 | .444 | 21 | – | 13 | .618 |
| Oklahoma State* | 8 | – | 10 | .444 | 15 | – | 15 | .500 |
| Iowa State | 7 | – | 11 | .389 | 22 | – | 13 | .629 |
| Oklahoma | 7 | – | 11 | .389 | 19 | – | 16 | .543 |
| Kansas State | 6 | – | 12 | .333 | 14 | – | 17 | .452 |
| West Virginia | 4 | – | 14 | .222 | 16 | – | 17 | .485 |
† 2022 Big 12 Tournament winner *Oklahoma State was ineligible for both the 2022 Big 12 Tournament and the 2022 NCAA tournament due to postseason ban imposed by the NCAA. Rankings from AP poll

The 2021–22 Big 12 men's basketball season began with practices in October 2020, followed by the start of the 2021–22 NCAA Division I men's basketball season in November. Regular season conference play began in November 2021 and concludes in March 2022. The 2022 Big 12 men's basketball tournament was held March 9–12, 2022, at the T-Mobile Center in Kansas City, Missouri.

Baylor won their first ever National Championship in 2021, becoming the first Big 12 team to win the National Championship since Kansas in 2008. Kansas would make it two straight national championships for the conference, defeating North Carolina, 72-69, in the finals.

== Coaches ==
=== Coaching changes ===
| Coach | School | Reason | Replacement |
|---|---|---|---|
| Steve Prohm | Iowa State | Fired | T. J. Otzelberger |
| Lon Kruger | Oklahoma | Retired | Porter Moser |
| Shaka Smart | Texas | Left for Marquette | Chris Beard |
| Chris Beard | Texas Tech | Left for Texas | Mark Adams |

=== Head coaches ===
Note: Stats are through the beginning of the season. All stats and records are from time at current school only.

| Team | Head coach | Previous job | Seasons at school as HC | Overall record at School | Big 12 record | NCAA tournaments | NCAA Final Fours | NCAA Championships |
|---|---|---|---|---|---|---|---|---|
| Baylor | Scott Drew | Valparaiso | 19th | 392–226 (.634)) | 153–151 (.503) | 9 | 1 | 1 |
| Iowa State | T. J. Otzelberger | UNLV | 1st | 0–0 (–) | 0–0 (–) | 0 | 0 | 0 |
| Kansas | Bill Self | Illinois | 19th | 522–118 (.816) | 248–59 (.808) | 17 | 3 | 1 |
| Kansas State | Bruce Weber | Illinois | 10th | 170–130 (.567) | 76–86 (.469) | 5 | 0 | 0 |
| Oklahoma | Porter Moser | Loyola Chicago | 1st | 0–0 (–) | 0–0 (–) | 0 | 0 | 0 |
| Oklahoma State | Mike Boynton | Oklahoma State (asst.) | 5th | 72–58 (.554) | 31–41 (.431) | 1 | 0 | 0 |
| TCU | Jamie Dixon | Pittsburgh | 6th | 96–71 (.575) | 34–54 (.386) | 1 | 0 | 0 |
| Texas | Chris Beard | Texas Tech | 1st | 0–0 (–) | 0–0 (–) | 0 | 0 | 0 |
| Texas Tech | Mark Adams | Texas Tech (asst.) | 1st | 0–0 (–) | 0–0 (–) | 0 | 0 | 0 |
| West Virginia | Bob Huggins | Kansas State | 15th | 310–171 (.644) | 140–111 (.558) | 10 | 1 | 0 |

== Preseason ==
=== Recruiting classes ===
Rankings
| Team | ESPN | Rivals | Scout/247 Sports | Signees |
|---|---|---|---|---|
| Baylor | No. 15 | No. 13 | No. 15 | 3 |
| Iowa State | - | No. 61 | No. 78 | 1 |
| Kansas | No. 9 | No. 16 | No. 11 | 4 |
| Kansas State | - | No. 82 | No. 126 | 2 |
| Oklahoma | - | No. 37 | No. 36 | 4 |
| Oklahoma State | - | - | - | - |
| TCU | - | No. 77 | No. 98 | 1 |
| Texas | - | No. 62 | No. 76 | 1 |
| Texas Tech | - | - | No. 115 | 1 |
| West Virginia | - | No. 35 | No. 46 | 4 |

=== Preseason watchlists ===
Below is a table of notable preseason watch lists.

| | Wooden | Naismith | Cousy | West | Erving | Malone | NABC | Abdul-Jabbar |
| Matthew Mayer, Baylor | ✓ | ✓ | | | ✓ | | | |
| Adam Flagler, Baylor | ✓ | ✓ | | ✓ | | | | |
| Ochai Agbaji, Kansas | ✓ | ✓ | | ✓ | | | ✓ | |
| Remy Martin, Kansas | ✓ | ✓ | ✓ | | | | ✓ | |
| David McCormack, Kansas | ✓ | ✓ | | | | | | ✓ |
| Marcus Carr, Texas | ✓ | ✓ | ✓ | | | | ✓ | |
| Terrence Shannon Jr., Texas Tech | ✓ | ✓ | | ✓ | | | | |
| James Akinjo, Baylor | | ✓ | | | | | | |
| Andrew Jones, Texas | | ✓ | | ✓ | | | | |
| Moussa Cissé, Oklahoma State | | | | | | | | ✓ |
| Tre Mitchell, Texas | | | | | | ✓ | | |
| Kendall Brown, Baylor | | | | | ✓ | | | |
| Jalen Wilson, Kansas | | | | | ✓ | | | |
| Timmy Allen, Texas | | | | | ✓ | | | |
| Kevin Obanor, Texas Tech | | | | | ✓ | | | |

Big 12 Preseason Poll

| | Big 12 Coaches | Points |
| 1. | Kansas (8) | 80 |
| 2. | Texas (2) | 70 |
| 3. | Baylor | 67 |
| 4. | Texas Tech | 51 |
| 5. | Oklahoma State | 49 |
| 5. | West Virginia | 49 |
| 7. | Oklahoma | 29 |
| 8. | TCU | 24 |
| 9. | Kansas State | 22 |
| 10. | Iowa State | 9 |
Reference: (#) first place votes

Pre-Season All-Big 12 Team

Big 12 Coaches
Matthew Mayer, G/F Baylor
Ochai Agbaji, G Kansas
Remy Martin, G Kansas
David McCormack, F Kansas
Marcus Carr, G Texas
Terrence Shannon Jr., G Texas Tech
† denotes unanimous selection

- Player of the Year: Remy Martin, Kansas
- Newcomer of the Year: Marcus Carr, Texas
- Freshman of the Year: Kendall Brown, Baylor

=== Preseason national polls ===
| | AP | Athlon; Sports | Blue Ribbon; Yearbook | CBS Sports | Coaches | ESPN | Kenpom | SBNation | Sports; Illustrated |
| Baylor | 8 | 8 | 12 | 14 | 7 | 10 | 4 | 8 | 7 |
| Iowa State | | | | 148 | | | 113 | | 108 |
| Kansas | 3 | 3 | 3 | 4 | 3 | 2 | 3 | 3 | 3 |
| Kansas State | | | | 86 | | | 82 | | 82 |
| Oklahoma | | | | 48 | | | 52 | | 47 |
| Oklahoma State | RV | | | 26 | RV | 23 | 37 | | 25 |
| TCU | | | | 120 | | | 75 | | 66 |
| Texas | 5 | 4 | 4 | 10 | 5 | 5 | 14 | 5 | 2 |
| Texas Tech | RV | | | 40 | RV | 26 | 12 | | 26 |
| West Virginia | | | | 45 | RV | | 46 | | 39 |

== Rankings ==
Legend
| Increase in ranking |
| Decrease in ranking |
| Not ranked previous week |

| | | Pre | Wk 2 | Wk 3 | Wk 4 | Wk 5 | Wk 6 | Wk 7 | Wk 8 | Wk 9 | Wk 10 | Wk 11 | Wk 12 | Wk 13 | Wk 14 | Wk 15 | Wk 16 | Wk 17 | Wk 18 | Final |
|---|---|---|---|---|---|---|---|---|---|---|---|---|---|---|---|---|---|---|---|---|
| Baylor | AP | 8 | 9 | 6 | 4 | 2 | 1 (61) | 1 (60) | 1 (61) | 1 (61) | 1 (61) | 5 | 4 | 8 | 10 | 7 | 10 | 3 | 3 | - |
| Baylor | C | 8 | – | 5 | 4 | 2 | 1 (30) | 1 (32) | 1 (32) | 1 (32) | 1 (32) | 6 | 4 | 8 | 10 | 8 | 11 | 4 | 3 | 9 |
| Iowa State | AP | | | | 19 | 17 | 11 | 9 | 8 | 11 | 15 | 15 | 23 | 20 | RV | | | RV | | - |
| Iowa State | C | | – | | 23 | 19 | 11 | 8 | 8 | 11 | 16 | 14 | 24 | 22 | RV | RV | | RV | RV | 23 |
| Kansas | AP | 3 | 3 | 4 | 8 | 8 | 7 | 7 | 6 | 6 | 9 | 7 | 5 | 10 | 8 | 6 | 5 | 6 | 6 | - |
| Kansas | C | 3 | – | 3 | 7 | 7 | 7 | 7 | 6 | 6 | 10 | 7 | 5 | 10 | 8 | 6 | 5 | 7 | 6 | 1 (32) |
| Kansas State | AP | | | | | | | | | | | | | | | | | | | - |
| Kansas State | C | | – | | | | | | | | | | | | | | | | | |
| Oklahoma | AP | | | | | RV | RV | RV | RV | RV | RV | RV | | | | | | | | - |
| Oklahoma | C | | – | | | RV | RV | RV | RV | RV | RV | RV | | RV | | | | | | |
| Oklahoma State | AP | RV | RV | | | | | RV | | | | | | | | | | | | - |
| Oklahoma State | C | RV | – | | RV | | | | | | | | | | | | | | | |
| TCU | AP | | | | | | | | | | | RV | RV | RV | | | | | | - |
| TCU | C | | – | | | | | | | | | RV | RV | RV | RV | RV | | | | RV |
| Texas | AP | 5 | 8 | 8 | 7 | 7 | 17 | 16 | 17 | 14 | 21 | 23 | RV | 23 | 20 | 20 | 20 | 21 | 22 | - |
| Texas | C | 5 | – | 8 | 8 | 11 | 17 | 17 | 18 | 16 | 22 | 22 | 25 | 21 | 20 | 20 | 22 | 21 | 22 | RV |
| Texas Tech | AP | RV | RV | RV | RV | RV | 25 | 25 | 25 | 25 | 19 | 18 | 13 | 14 | 9 | 11 | 9 | 12 | 14 | - |
| Texas Tech | C | RV | – | RV | RV | RV | 24 | 25 | 25 | 25 | 19 | 19 | 14 | 14 | 9 | 11 | 9 | 12 | 14 | 12 |
| West Virginia | AP | RV | | | | | RV | RV | RV | RV | RV | RV | | | | | | | | - |
| West Virginia | C | RV | – | RV | RV | | RV | RV | RV | RV | RV | RV | | | | | | | | |

== Regular season ==
=== Conference matrix ===
| | Baylor | Iowa State | Kansas | Kansas State | Oklahoma | Oklahoma State | TCU | Texas | Texas Tech | West Virginia |
|---|---|---|---|---|---|---|---|---|---|---|
| vs. Baylor | — | 0–2 | 1–1 | 0–2 | 0–2 | 1–1 | 0–2 | 0–2 | 2–0 | 0–2 |
| vs. Iowa State | 2–0 | – | 2–0 | 1–1 | 1–1 | 1–1 | 1–1 | 1–1 | 1–1 | 1–1 |
| vs. Kansas | 1–1 | 0–2 | — | 0–2 | 0–2 | 0–2 | 1–1 | 1–1 | 1–1 | 0–2 |
| vs. Kansas State | 2–0 | 1–1 | 2–0 | — | 2–0 | 1–1 | 1–1 | 1–1 | 1–1 | 1–1 |
| vs. Oklahoma | 2–0 | 1–1 | 2–0 | 0–2 | — | 1–1 | 2–0 | 2–0 | 1–1 | 0–2 |
| vs. Oklahoma State | 1–1 | 1–1 | 2–0 | 1–1 | 1–1 | – | 1–1 | 1–1 | 1–1 | 1–1 |
| vs. TCU | 2–0 | 1–1 | 1–1 | 1–1 | 0–2 | 1–1 | – | 2–0 | 1–1 | 1–1 |
| vs. Texas | 2–0 | 1–1 | 1–1 | 1–1 | 0–2 | 1–1 | 0–2 | — | 2–0 | 0–2 |
| vs. Texas Tech | 0–2 | 1–1 | 1–1 | 1–1 | 1–1 | 1–1 | 1–1 | 0–2 | — | 0–2 |
| vs. West Virginia | 2–0 | 1–1 | 2–0 | 1–1 | 2–0 | 1–1 | 1–1 | 2–0 | 2–0 | — |
| Total | 14–4 | 7–11 | 14–4 | 6–12 | 7–11 | 8–10 | 8–10 | 10–8 | 12–6 | 4–14 |

Through games of March 5, 2022

=== Multi-Team Events ===
| | MTE | Place/Finish |
| Baylor | Battle 4 Atlantis | 1st |
| Iowa State | NIT Season Tip-Off | 1st |
| Kansas | ESPN Events Invitational | 3rd |
| Kansas State | Hall of Fame Classic | 4th |
| Oklahoma | Myrtle Beach Invitational | 2nd |
| Oklahoma State | Basketball Hall of Fame Showcase | 2-0 |
| TCU | SoCal Challenge | 2-1 |
| Texas | Abe Lemons Classic | 3-0 |
| Texas Tech | Texas Tech/Grand Canyon MTE | 2-0 |
| West Virginia | Charleston Classic | 3rd |

== Big 12 - Big East Battle ==
| Date | Big East team | Big 12 team | Score | Location | Television | Attendance | Leader |
|---|---|---|---|---|---|---|---|
| Wed., Dec. 1 | Providence | Texas Tech | 72–68 | Dunkin Donuts Center • Providence, Rhode Island | FS1 | 10,020 | Big East (1–0) |
| Fri., Dec. 3 | St. John's | No. 8 Kansas | 95–75 | UBS Arena • Elmont, New York | FS1 | 9,769 | Tie (1–1) |
| Sat., Dec. 4 | Creighton | No. 19 Iowa State | 64–58 | CHI Health Center Omaha • Omaha, Nebraska | FS1 | 18,294 | Big 12 (2–1) |
| Sun., Dec. 5 | Xavier | Oklahoma State | 77–71 | Gallagher-Iba Arena • Stillwater, Oklahoma | ESPN2 | 13,611 | Tie (2–2) |
| Tue., Dec. 7 | Butler | Oklahoma | 66–62 | Lloyd Noble Center • Norman, Oklahoma | ESPN2 | 11,562 | Big East (3–2) |
| Wed., Dec. 8 | No. 15 UConn | West Virginia | 56–53 | WVU Coliseum • Morgantown, West Virginia | ESPN2 | 12,045 | Tie (3–3) |
| Wed., Dec. 8 | Marquette | Kansas State | 64–63 | Bramlage Coliseum • Manhattan, Kansas | ESPN2 | 7,184 | Big East (4–3) |
| Thu., Dec. 9 | No. 23 Seton Hall | No. 7 Texas | 64–60 | Prudential Center • Newark, New Jersey | FS1 | 10,481 | Big East (5–3) |
| Sun., Dec. 12 | No. 6 Villanova | No. 2 Baylor | 57–36 | Ferrell Center • Waco, Texas | ABC | 10,264 | Big East (5–4) |
| Sat., Dec. 18 | Georgetown | TCU | 80–73 | Capital One Arena • Washington, D.C. | FS1 | 5,053 | Tie (5–5) |
WINNERS ARE IN BOLD. HOME TEAM IN ITALICS. Rankings from AP Poll released prior to the game. Did not participate: DePaul

== Big 12/SEC Challenge ==
| Date | Time | Big 12 team | SEC team | Location | TV | Attendance | Winner | Leader |
|---|---|---|---|---|---|---|---|---|
| Sat., Jan. 29 | 12:00 PM | TCU | 19 LSU | Schollmaier Arena • Fort Worth, TX | ESPN2 | 6,539 | TCU (77-68) | Big 12 (1-0) |
| Sat., Jan. 29 | 2:00 PM | Oklahoma | 1 Auburn | Auburn Arena • Auburn, AL | ESPN | 9,121 | Auburn (86-68) | Tied (1-1) |
| Sat., Jan. 29 | 2:00 PM | West Virginia | Arkansas | Bud Walton Arena • Fayetteville, AR | ESPN2 | 19,200 | Arkansas (77-66) | SEC (2-1) |
| Sat., Jan. 29 | 2:00 PM | 23 Iowa State | Missouri | Hilton Coliseum • Ames, IA | ESPNU | 13,612 | Iowa State (67-50) | Tied (2-2) |
| Sat., Jan. 29 | 4:00 PM | 4 Baylor | Alabama | Coleman Coliseum • Tuscaloosa, AL | ESPN | 14,474 | Alabama (87-78) | SEC (3-2) |
| Sat., Jan. 29 | 4:00 PM | Oklahoma State | Florida | O'Connell Center • Gainesville, FL | ESPN2 | 10,056 | Florida (81-72) | SEC (4-2) |
| Sat., Jan. 29 | 4:00 PM | Kansas State | Ole Miss | The Sandy and John Black Pavilion at Ole Miss • Oxford, MS | ESPNU | 7,135 | Ole Miss (67-56) | SEC (5-2) |
| Sat., Jan. 29 | 6:00 PM | 5 Kansas | 12 Kentucky | Allen Fieldhouse • Lawrence, KS | ESPN | 16,300 | Kentucky (80-62) | SEC (6-2) |
| Sat., Jan. 29 | 6:00 PM | 13 Texas Tech | Mississippi State | United Supermarkets Arena • Lubbock, TX | ESPN2 | 15,098 | Texas Tech (76-50) | SEC (6-3) |
| Sat., Jan. 29 | 8:00 PM | Texas | 18 Tennessee | Frank Erwin Center • Austin, TX | ESPN | 16,540 | Texas (52-51) | SEC (6-4) |
Georgia, South Carolina, Texas A&M and Vanderbilt did not participate for the SEC. All times Eastern

== Players of the Week ==
| Week | Player of the week | Newcomer of the week |
|---|---|---|
| November 15, 2021 | Ochai Agbaji, Kansas | Tanner Groves, Oklahoma |
| November 22, 2021 | Taz Sherman, West Virginia | Tre Mitchell, Texas |
| November 29, 2021 | Gabe Kalscheur, Iowa State | Gabe Kalscheur, Iowa State |
| December 6, 2021 | Christian Braun, Kansas | Tanner Groves, Oklahoma (2) |
| December 13, 2021 | Taz Sherman, West Virginia (2) | Izaiah Brockington, Iowa State |
| December 20, 2021 | Mike Miles, TCU | Kendall Brown, Baylor |
| December 27, 2021 | Izaiah Brockington, Iowa State | Izaiah Brockington, Iowa State (2) |
| December 27, 2021 | Sean McNeil, West Virginia | Izaiah Brockington, Iowa State (2) |
| January 3, 2022 | James Akinjo, Baylor | Mark Smith, Kansas State |
| January 10, 2022 | Adam Flagler, Baylor | James Akinjo, Baylor |
| January 17, 2022 | Ochai Agbaji, Kansas (2) | Gabe Kalscheur, Iowa State (2) |
| January 24, 2022 | Ochai Agbaji, Kansas (3) | Kevin Obanor, Texas Tech |
| January 24, 2022 | Nijel Pack, Kansas State | Kevin Obanor, Texas Tech |
| January 31, 2022 | Izaiah Brockington, Iowa State (2) | Bryson Williams, Texas Tech |
| February 7, 2022 | Nijel Pack, Kansas State (2) | Damion Baugh, TCU |
| February 14, 2022 | Jalen Wilson, Kansas | James Akinjo, Baylor (2) |
| February 21, 2022 | Ochai Agbaji, Kansas (4) | Bryson Williams, Texas Tech (2) |
| February 21, 2022 | Izaiah Brockington, Iowa State (3) | Bryson Williams, Texas Tech (2) |
| February 28, 2022 | Izaiah Brockington, Iowa State (4) | Timmy Allen, Texas |
| March 7, 2022 | James Akinjo, Baylor (2) | Kendall Brown, Baylor (2) |
| March 7, 2022 | James Akinjo, Baylor (2) | Tanner Groves, Oklahoma (3) |

== Record vs Other Conferences ==
The Big 12 had record of 119–28 in non-conference play.

Power 6 Conferences
| Conference | Record |
| ACC | 7–3 |
| Big East | 10–6 |
| Big Ten | 5–2 |
| Pac–12 | 6–1 |
| SEC | 10–7 |
| Combined | 38–19 |

Other Conferences
| Conference | Record |
| America East | 3–0 |
| American | 4–2 |
| ASUN | 5–0 |
| Atlantic 10 | 2–2 |
| Big Sky | 3–0 |
| Big South | 1–0 |
| Big West | 0–0 |
| Colonial | 2–0 |
| Conference USA | 5–0 |
| Horizon | 4–1 |
| Independents/Non-Division I | 0–0 |
| Ivy League | 0–0 |
| Metro Atlantic | 1–0 |
| Mid-American | 1–0 |
| Mid-Eastern Athletic | 1–0 |
| Missouri Valley | 2–0 |
| Mountain West | 2–1 |
| Northeast | 0–0 |
| Ohio Valley | 1–0 |
| Patriot | 0–0 |
| Southern | 0–0 |
| Southland | 12–0 |
| Southwestern Athletic | 16–0 |
| Summit | 5–0 |
| Sun Belt | 3–0 |
| West Coast | 1–3 |
| Western Athletic | 7–0 |
| Combined | 81–9 |

== Bracket ==
First round Wednesday, March 9
8 | Kansas State | 67
9 | West Virginia | 73

Quarterfinals; Thursday, March 10
1 | Kansas | 87
9 | West Virginia | 63
4 | Texas | 60
5 | TCU | 65
2 | Baylor | 67
7 | Oklahoma | 72
3 | Texas Tech | 72
6 | Iowa State | 41

Semifinals; Friday, March 11
1 | Kansas | 75
5 | TCU | 62
7 | Oklahoma | 55
3 | Texas Tech | 56

Championship; Saturday, March 12
1 | Kansas | 74
3 | Texas Tech | 65

=== NCAA tournament ===
The winner of the Big 12 tournament, Kansas, received the conference's automatic bid to the NCAA tournament. Six Big 12 teams received bids to the NCAA tournament.

| Seed | Region | School | First round | Second round | Sweet Sixteen | Elite Eight | Final Four | Championship |
|---|---|---|---|---|---|---|---|---|
| 1 | Midwest | Kansas | defeated (16) Texas Southern 83–56 | defeated (9) Creighton 79–72 | defeated (4) Providence 88–61 | defeated (10) Miami (FL) 76–50 | defeated (S 2) Villanova 81–65 | defeated (E 8) North Carolina 72–69 |
| 1 | East | Baylor | defeated (16) Norfolk State 85–49 | lost to (8) North Carolina 93–86 | | | | |
| 3 | West | Texas Tech | defeated (14) Montana St 97–62 | defeated (14) Montana State 97–62 | lost to (2) Duke 78–73 | | | |
| 6 | East | Texas | defeated (11) Virginia Tech 81–73 | lost to (2) Purdue 81–71 | | | | |
| 9 | South | TCU | defeated (8) Seton Hall 69–42 | lost to (1) Arizona 85–80 | | | | |
| 11 | Midwest | Iowa State | defeated (6) LSU 59–54 | defeated (3) Wisconsin 54–49 | lost to (10) Miami (FL) 70–56 | | | |
| | | W–L (%): | 6–0 (1.000) | 3–3 (.500) | 1–2 (.333) | 1–0 (1.000) | 1–0 (1.000) | 1–0 (1.000) Total: 13–5 (.722) |

== Honors and awards ==
=== All-Americans ===
Consensus All-Americans
First Team
G Ochai Agbaji, KU

To earn "consensus" status, a player must win honors from a majority of the following teams: the Associated Press, the USBWA, Sporting News, and the National Association of Basketball Coaches.

James Akinjo also received third team All-American honors from the AP, ISBWA, Sporting News and NABC.

=== All-Big 12 awards and teams ===
2022 Big 12 Men's Basketball Individual Awards
| Award | Recipient(s) |
| Player of the Year | Ochai Agbaji, KU† |
| Coach of the Year | Scott Drew, BU |
| Co-Defensive Players of the Year | Jonathan Tchamwa Tchatchoua, BU; Moussa Cisse, OSU; Gabe Osabuohien, WVU |
| Sixth Man Award | Jeremy Sochan, Baylor |
| Newcomer of the Year | Izaiah Brockington, ISU |
| Freshman of the Year | Tyrese Hunter, ISU |
| Most Improved Player | Nijel Pack, KSU |

2022 Big 12 Men's Basketball All-Conference Teams
| First Team | Second Team | Third Team | Defensive Team | Newcomer Team | Freshman Team |
| James Akinjo, BU; Izaiah Brockington, ISU; Ochai Agbaji, KU†; Nigel Pack, KSU; Bryson Williams, TTU† | Adam Flagler, BU; Christian Braun, KU; Mike Miles Jr., TCU; Timmy Allen, UT; Taz Sherman, WVU | David McCormack, KU; Jalen Wilson, KU; Mark Smith, KSU; Avery Anderson III, OSU; Marcus Carr, UT | Jonathan Tchamwa Tchatchoua, BU; Dajuan Harris Jr., KU; Markquis Nowell, KSU; Moussa Cisse, OSU; Gabe Osabuohien, WVU | James Akinjo, BU; Izaiah Brockington, ISU; Mark Smith, KSU; Timmy Allen, UT; Bryson Williams, TTU† | Jeremy Sochan, BU†; Kendall Brown, BU†; KJ Adams Jr., KU; Tyrese Hunter, ISU†; C.J. Noland, OU |
† - denotes unanimous selection

Honorable Mention: Matthew Mayer (Baylor), Jeremy Sochan (Baylor), Dajuan Harris Jr. (Kansas), Markquis Nowell (Kansas State), Umoja Gibson (Oklahoma), Jordan Goldwire (Oklahoma), Tanner Groves (Oklahoma), Elijah Harkless (Oklahoma), Damion Baugh (TCU), Emanuel Miller (TCU), Christian Bishop (Texas), Andrew Jones (Texas), Courtney Ramey (Texas), Adonis Arms (Texas Tech), Kevin McCullar (Texas Tech), Kevin Obanor (Texas Tech), Marcus Santos-Silva (Texas Tech), Sean McNeil (West Virginia)
