= 2020–21 Baylor Bears basketball team =

American college basketball season

2020–21 Baylor Bears basketball

NCAA tournament National Champions Big 12 regular season champions Men's Vegas Bubble champions

National Championship Game, W 86–70 vs. Gonzaga
- Conference: Big 12 Conference

Ranking
- Coaches: No. 1
- AP: No. 3
- Record: 28–2 (13–1 Big 12)
- Head coach: Scott Drew (18th season)
- Associate head coach: Jerome Tang (18th season)
- Assistant coaches: Alvin Brooks III (5th season); John Jakus (4th season)
- Offensive scheme: Motion
- Base defense: No-Middle
- Home arena: Ferrell Center

2020–21 Big 12 men's basketball standings
	Conf.				Overall
Team	W		L	PCT	W		L	PCT
No. 1 Baylor	13	–	1	.929	28	–	2	.933
No. 16 Kansas	12	–	6	.667	21	–	9	.700
No. 21 Texas †	11	–	6	.647	19	–	8	.704
No. 18 West Virginia	11	–	6	.647	19	–	10	.655
No. 19 Oklahoma State	11	–	7	.611	21	–	9	.700
No. 22 Texas Tech	9	–	8	.529	18	–	11	.621
Oklahoma	9	–	8	.529	16	–	11	.593
TCU	5	–	11	.313	12	–	14	.462
Kansas State	4	–	14	.222	9	–	20	.310
Iowa State	0	–	18	.000	2	–	22	.083
† 2021 Big 12 Tournament winner Rankings from AP poll

The 2020–21 Baylor Bears basketball team represented Baylor University in the 2020–21 NCAA Division I men's basketball season. The Bears, members of the Big 12 Conference, played their home games at the Ferrell Center in Waco, Texas. They were led by 18th-year head coach Scott Drew.

The 2020–21 season was the greatest season in Baylor's 115-year basketball history. They finished the season 28–2, 13–1 in Big 12 play to win their first regular season championship of any sort since 1950. In the Big 12 tournament, they defeated Kansas State in the quarterfinals before losing to Oklahoma State in the semifinals. They received an at-large bid to the NCAA tournament as the No. 1 seed in the South region. The Bears defeated Hartford and Wisconsin to advance to the Sweet Sixteen. They defeated Villanova and Arkansas to advance to the school's first Final Four since 1950. In the Final Four, they defeated Houston to advance to the school's second national championship game. In the championship, they defeated No. 1 overall seed Gonzaga to win the school's first national championship.

== Previous season ==
The Bears finished the season 2019–20 season 26–4 and 15–3 in Big 12 play to finish in second place. The team was scheduled to play Kansas State in the quarterfinals of the Big 12 tournament before the tournament was canceled due to the ongoing COVID-19 pandemic. The NCAA tournament was also canceled due to the pandemic.

== Offseason ==
=== Departures ===
Name	Number	Pos.	Height	Weight	Year	Hometown	Reason for departure
Devonte Bandoo	2	G	6'3"	185	Senior	Mississauga, ON	Graduated
Obim Okeke	15	G	6'0"	225	Senior	Las Vegas, NV	Graduated
Tristan Clark	25	F	6'10"	245	Junior	San Antonio, TX	Retired from basketball due to multiple injuries
Freddie Gillespie	33	F	6'9"	245	RS Senior	St. Paul, MN	Graduated

=== Incoming transfers ===
Name	Number	Pos.	Height	Weight	Year	Hometown	Previous School
Mark Paterson	35	G	6'1"	180	Graduate Student	Dallas, TX	St. Edwards

=== Recruiting classes ===
==== 2020 recruiting class ====
College recruiting information
Name	Hometown	School	Height	Weight	Commit date
LJ Cryer; PG	Katy, TX	Morton Ranch (TX)	6 ft 1 in (1.85 m)	180 lb (82 kg)	Jun 11, 2019
LJ Cryer; PG	Recruit ratings: Rivals: 247Sports: ESPN: (84)				
Dain Dainja; C	Brooklyn Park, MN	Park Center (MN)	6 ft 9 in (2.06 m)	260 lb (120 kg)	Jun 22, 2019
Dain Dainja; C	Recruit ratings: Rivals: 247Sports: ESPN: (86)				
Zach Loveday; C	Gallipolis, OH	Huntington Prep (WV)	7 ft 0 in (2.13 m)	200 lb (91 kg)	Sep 25, 2019
Zach Loveday; C	Recruit ratings: Rivals: 247Sports: ESPN: (80)				
Overall recruit ranking: Rivals: 42 247Sports: 28 ESPN: 22
Note: In many cases, Scout, Rivals, 247Sports, On3, and ESPN may conflict in their listings of height and weight.; In these cases, the average was taken. ESPN grades are on a 100-point scale.; Sources: "Baylor 2020 Basketball Commitments". Rivals.; "2020 Baylor Bears Recruiting Class". ESPN.; "2020 Team Ranking". Rivals.

==== 2021 Recruiting class ====
College recruiting information (2021)
Name	Hometown	School	Height	Weight	Commit date
Langston Love; SG	San Antonio, TX	Montverde Academy (FL)	6 ft 4 in (1.93 m)	190 lb (86 kg)	Jul 15, 2020
Langston Love; SG	Recruit ratings: Rivals: 247Sports: ESPN: (89)				
Jeremy Sochan; PF	Southampton, UK	OrangeAcademy (GE)	6 ft 8 in (2.03 m)	215 lb (98 kg)	Jul 16, 2020
Jeremy Sochan; PF	Recruit ratings: Rivals: 247Sports: ESPN: (75)				
Kendall Brown; SF	Cottage Grove, MN	Sunrise Christian Academy (KS)	6 ft 8 in (2.03 m)	205 lb (93 kg)	Jul 20, 2020
Kendall Brown; SF	Recruit ratings: Rivals: 247Sports: ESPN: (90)				
Overall recruit ranking: Rivals: 8 247Sports: 5 ESPN: —
Note: In many cases, Scout, Rivals, 247Sports, On3, and ESPN may conflict in their listings of height and weight.; In these cases, the average was taken. ESPN grades are on a 100-point scale.; Sources: "Baylor 2021 Basketball Commitments". Rivals.; "2021 Baylor Bears Recruiting Class". ESPN.; "2021 Team Ranking". Rivals.

== Preseason ==
=== Big 12 coaches' poll ===
The Big 12 preseason coaches' poll was released on October 29, 2020. Baylor was predicted to come in first place.

Big 12 coaches' poll
Predicted finish	Team	Votes (1st place)
1	Baylor	79(7)
2	Kansas	73(3)
3	West Virginia	61
4	Texas	58
5	Texas Tech	53
6	Oklahoma	39
7	Oklahoma State	35
8	Iowa State	19
9	TCU	18
10	Kansas State	15

== Roster ==
2020–21 Baylor Bears men's basketball team
Players
Coaches

Pos.	#	Name	Height	Weight	Year	Previous school	Hometown
F	0	Flo Thamba	6 ft 10 in (2.08 m)	245 lb (111 kg)	Jr	Mountain Mission	Kinshasa, DR Congo
G	4	LJ Cryer	6 ft 1 in (1.85 m)	185 lb (84 kg)	Fr	Morton Ranch	Katy, TX
G/F	5	Jordan Turner	6 ft 8 in (2.03 m)	195 lb (88 kg)	RS Fr	Sunrise Christian Academy	Houston, TX
G	10	Adam Flagler	6 ft 3 in (1.91 m)	180 lb (82 kg)	RS So	Presbyterian	Duluth, GA
G/F	11	Mark Vital	6 ft 5 in (1.96 m)	250 lb (113 kg)	RS Sr	Advanced Prep International	Lake Charles, LA
G	12	Jared Butler	6 ft 3 in (1.91 m)	195 lb (88 kg)	Jr	Riverside Academy	Reserve, LA
G/F	13	Jackson Moffatt (W)	6 ft 7 in (2.01 m)	200 lb (91 kg)	RS So	Magnolia	Magnolia, TX
F	23	Jonathan Tchamwa Tchatchoua	6 ft 8 in (2.03 m)	245 lb (111 kg)	RS So	UNLV	Douala, Cameroon
G/F	24	Matthew Mayer	6 ft 9 in (2.06 m)	225 lb (102 kg)	Jr	Westlake	Austin, TX
G	31	MaCio Teague	6 ft 4 in (1.93 m)	195 lb (88 kg)	RS Sr	UNC Asheville	Cincinnati, OH
F	32	Zach Loveday	7 ft 0 in (2.13 m)	215 lb (98 kg)	Fr	Huntington Prep	Gallipolis, OH
G	35	Mark Paterson (W)	6 ft 1 in (1.85 m)	180 lb (82 kg)	GS	St. Edward's	Dallas, TX
F	42	Dain Dainja	6 ft 9 in (2.06 m)	270 lb (122 kg)	Fr	Park Center	Brooklyn Park, MN
G	45	Davion Mitchell	6 ft 2 in (1.88 m)	205 lb (93 kg)	RS Jr	Auburn	Hinesville, GA

Head coach

- Scott Drew (Butler)

Assistant coach(es)

- Alvin Brooks III (Idaho State)
- John Jakus (Trinity International)
- Jerome Tang (Charter Oak)

Legend

- (C) Team captain
- (S) Suspended
- (I) Ineligible
- (W) Walk-on
- Injured
- Current redshirt

Roster
Last update: November 10, 2020

== Schedule and results ==
The Bears' initial schedule included participation in the Empire Classic at Mohegan Sun Arena in Uncasville, Connecticut, where they would have played Arizona State on November 25, followed by either Villanova or Boston College on November 26; however, the Bears were forced to withdraw after Scott Drew announced he had tested positive for COVID-19. The Bears were likewise forced to cancel their game scheduled for November 29 against Seton Hall.

Date time, TV	Rank^{#}	Opponent^{#}	Result	Record	High points	High rebounds	High assists	Site (attendance) city, state
Regular Season
November 28, 2020*; 7:00 p.m., FloHoops	No. 2	vs. Louisiana; Men's Vegas Bubble	W 112–82	1–0	21 – Teague	7 – Teague	7 – Mitchell	T-Mobile Arena (0); Paradise, NV
November 29, 2020*; 5:00 p.m., FloHoops	No. 2	vs. Washington; Men's Vegas Bubble	W 86–52	2–0	20 – Butler	15 – Vital	7 – Mitchell	T-Mobile Arena (0); Paradise, NV
December 2, 2020*; 9:00 p.m., ESPN	No. 2	vs. No. 5 Illinois; Jimmy V Classic	W 82–69	3–0	18 – Flagler	8 – Tchatchoua	7 – Mitchell	Bankers Life Fieldhouse (0); Indianapolis, Indiana
December 5, 2020*; 12:00 p.m., CBS	No. 2	vs. No. 1 Gonzaga; Cancelled due to COVID-19 issues						Bankers Life Fieldhouse; Indianapolis, Indiana
December 9, 2020*; 7:00 p.m., ESPN+	No. 2	Stephen F. Austin; Replaced game against Nicholls scheduled for December 8	W 83–52	4–0	14 – Flagler	6 – Tie	7 – Tie	Ferrell Center (2,350); Waco, Texas
December 13, 2020; 2:00 p.m., ESPN	No. 2	No. 13 Texas; Cancelled due to COVID-19 issues						Ferrell Center; Waco, Texas
December 15, 2020*; 7:00 p.m., ESPN+	No. 2	Tarleton State; Cancelled due to COVID-19 issues						Ferrell Center; Waco, Texas
December 19, 2020; 3:00 p.m., ESPN+	No. 2	at Kansas State	W 100–69	5–0 (1–0)	23 – Teague	10 – Teague	13 – Butler	Bramlage Coliseum (848); Manhattan, Kansas
December 21, 2020*; 7:00 p.m., ESPN+	No. 2	Arkansas–Pine Bluff	W 99–42	6–0	15 – Cryer	8 – Tied	7 – Butler	Ferrell Center (2,350); Waco, Texas
December 29, 2020*; 3:00 p.m., ESPN+	No. 2	Central Arkansas	W 93–56	7–0	20 – Teague	11 – Tchatchoua	12 – Mitchell	Ferrell Center (0); Waco, Texas
December 30, 2020*; 2:00 p.m., ESPN+	No. 2	Alcorn State	W 105–76	8–0	18 – Teague	8 – Tchatchoua	10 – Mitchell	Ferrell Center (2,350); Waco, Texas
January 2, 2021; 12:00 p.m., ESPN+	No. 2	at Iowa State	W 76–65	9–0 (2–0)	21 – Butler	10 – Tchatchoua	5 – Butler	Hilton Coliseum (1,318); Ames, Iowa
January 6, 2021; 8:00 p.m., ESPN2	No. 2	Oklahoma	W 76–61	10–0 (3–0)	17 – Teague	8 – Vital	4 – Mitchell	Ferrell Center (2,350); Waco, Texas
January 9, 2021; 1:00 p.m., ESPN	No. 2	at TCU	W 67–49	11–0 (4–0)	28 – Butler	8 – Butler	6 – Mitchell	Schollmaier Arena (1,891); Fort Worth, Texas
January 16, 2021; 3:00 p.m., ESPN	No. 2	at No. 15 Texas Tech	W 68–60	12–0 (5–0)	19 – Mitchell	5 – Tie	3 – Butler	United Supermarkets Arena (4,250); Lubbock, Texas
January 18, 2021; 8:00 p.m., ESPN	No. 2	No. 9 Kansas	W 77–69	13–0 (6–0)	30 – Butler	10 – Vital	8 – Butler	Ferrell Center (2,350); Waco, Texas
January 23, 2021; 1:00 p.m., CBS	No. 2	at Oklahoma State	W 81–66	14–0 (7–0)	22 – Butler	7 – Mayer	9 – Mitchell	Gallagher-Iba Arena (3,350); Stillwater, Oklahoma
January 27, 2021; 8:00 p.m., ESPN2	No. 2	Kansas State	W 107–59	15–0 (8–0)	31 – Mitchell	7 – Butler	5 – Tied	Ferrell Center (2,350); Waco, Texas
January 30, 2021*; 3:00 p.m., ESPN	No. 2	Auburn; Big 12/SEC Challenge	W 84–72	16–0	19 – Flagler	11 – Thamba	7 – Mitchell	Ferrell Center (2,350); Waco, Texas
February 2, 2021; 6:00 p.m., ESPN	No. 2	at No. 6 Texas	W 83–69	17–0 (9–0)	27 – Mitchell	6 – Tied	4 – Mitchell	Frank Erwin Center (2,532); Austin, Texas
February 6, 2021; 3:00 p.m., ESPN+	No. 2	TCU; Cancelled due to COVID-19 issues within Baylor						Ferrell Center; Waco, Texas
February 10, 2021; 5:00 p.m., ESPN2	No. 2	at No. 12 Oklahoma; Cancelled due to COVID-19 issues within Baylor						Lloyd Noble Center; Norman, Oklahoma
February 13, 2021; 1:00 p.m., ESPN	No. 2	No. 7 Texas Tech; Postponed due to COVID-19 issues within Baylor						Ferrell Center; Waco, Texas
February 15, 2021; 8:00 p.m., ESPN	No. 2	at No. 13 West Virginia; Postponed due to COVID-19 issues within Baylor						WVU Coliseum; Morgantown, West Virginia
February 18, 2021; 4:00 p.m., ESPN2	No. 2	No. 13 West Virginia; Rescheduled from January 12; Postponed due to COVID-19 issues within Baylor						Ferrell Center; Waco, Texas
February 20, 2021; 3:00 p.m., ESPN	No. 2	Oklahoma State; Postponed due to COVID-19 issues within Baylor						Ferrell Center; Waco, Texas
February 23, 2021; 7:00 p.m., ESPN+	No. 2	Iowa State	W 77–72	18–0 (10–0)	22 – Flagler	15 – Vital	4 – Mitchell	Ferrell Center (2,350); Waco, Texas
February 25, 2021; 4:00 pm, ESPN2	No. 2	No. 10 West Virginia; Rescheduled from February 18, Canceled due to COVID-19 issues within West Virginia						Ferrell Center; Waco, Texas
February 27, 2021; 7:00 p.m., ESPN	No. 2	at No. 17 Kansas	L 58–71	18–1 (10–1)	18 – Teague	8 – Teague	3 – Tied	Allen Fieldhouse (2,600); Lawrence, Kansas
March 2, 2021; 4:00 p.m., ESPN	No. 3	at No. 6 West Virginia; Rescheduled from February 15	W 94–89 ^{OT}	19–1 (11–1)	25 – Butler	8 – Vital	6 – Butler	WVU Coliseum (2,800); Morgantown, West Virginia
March 4, 2021; 6:00 p.m., ESPN2	No. 3	No. 17 Oklahoma State; Rescheduled from February 20	W 81–70	20–1 (12–1)	22 – Butler	7 – Mayer	7 – Mitchell	Ferrell Center (2,350); Waco, Texas
March 7, 2021; 3:00 p.m., ESPN	No. 3	No. 18 Texas Tech; Rescheduled from February 13	W 88–73	21–1 (13–1)	35 – Teague	15 – Vital	7 – Mitchell	Ferrell Center (2,350); Waco, Texas
Big 12 Tournament
March 11, 2021; 1:30 pm, ESPN	(1) No. 2	vs. (9) Kansas State; Quarterfinals	W 74–68	22–1	24 – Teague	10 – Vital	6 – Vital	T-Mobile Center (3,491); Kansas City, MO
March 12, 2021; 5:30 pm, ESPN	(1) No. 2	vs. (5) No. 12 Oklahoma State; Semifinals	L 74–83	22–2	17 – Teague	10 – Vital	3 – Mitchell	T-Mobile Center (3,298); Kansas City, MO
NCAA tournament
March 19, 2021; 2:30 pm, truTV	(1 S) No. 3	vs. (16 S) Hartford; First Round	W 79–55	23–2	22 – Teague	9 – Mayer	9 – Butler	Lucas Oil Stadium (5,837); Indianapolis, IN
March 21, 2021; 1:40 pm, CBS	(1 S) No. 3	vs. (9 S) Wisconsin; Second Round	W 76–63	24–2	17 – Mayer	7 – Vital	8 – Mitchell	Hinkle Fieldhouse; Indianapolis, IN
March 27, 2021; 4:15 pm, CBS	(1 S) No. 3	vs. (5 S) No. 18 Villanova; Sweet Sixteen	W 62–51	25–2	16 – Flagler	9 – Vital	3 – Butler	Hinkle Fieldhouse; Indianapolis, IN
March 29, 2021; 8:57 pm, CBS	(1 S) No. 3	vs. (3 S) No. 10 Arkansas; Elite Eight	W 81–72	26–2	22 – Teague	6 – Tchatchoua	6 – Mitchell	Lucas Oil Stadium (7,519); Indianapolis, IN
April 3, 2021; 4:14 pm, CBS	(1 S) No. 3	vs. (2 MW) No. 6 Houston; Final Four	W 78–59	27–2	17 – Butler	6 – Tchatchoua	11 – Mitchell	Lucas Oil Stadium (8,131); Indianapolis, IN
April 5, 2021; 8:20 pm, CBS	(1 S) No. 3	vs. (1 W) No. 1 Gonzaga; National championship	W 86–70	28–2	22 – Butler	11 – Vital	7 – Butler	Lucas Oil Stadium; Indianapolis, IN
*Non-conference game. ^{#}Rankings from AP Poll. (#) Tournament seedings in parentheses. All times are in Central Time.

== Rankings ==
Ranking movements Legend: ██ Increase in ranking ██ Decrease in ranking ( ) = First-place votes
	Week																	
Poll	Pre	1	2	3	4	5	6	7	8	9	10	11	12	13	14	15	16	Final
AP	2 (24)	2 (6)	2 (7)	2 (7)	2 (3)	2 (2)	2 (1)	2 (1)	2 (2)	2 (3)	2 (3)	2 (8)	2 (5)	2 (4)	3	2 (2)	3	Not released
Coaches	1 (12)	1 (12)^	2 (8)	2 (6)	2 (5)	2 (3)	2 (3)	2 (3)	2 (3)	2 (3)	2 (4)	2 (4)	2 (4)	2 (4)	3	2	3	1 (32)

^Coaches did not release a Week 1 poll.

== See also ==
- 2020–21 Big 12 Conference men's basketball season
- 2020–21 NCAA Division I men's basketball season
- 2020–21 Baylor Lady Bears basketball team
