= List of Florida Atlantic Owls men's basketball head coaches =

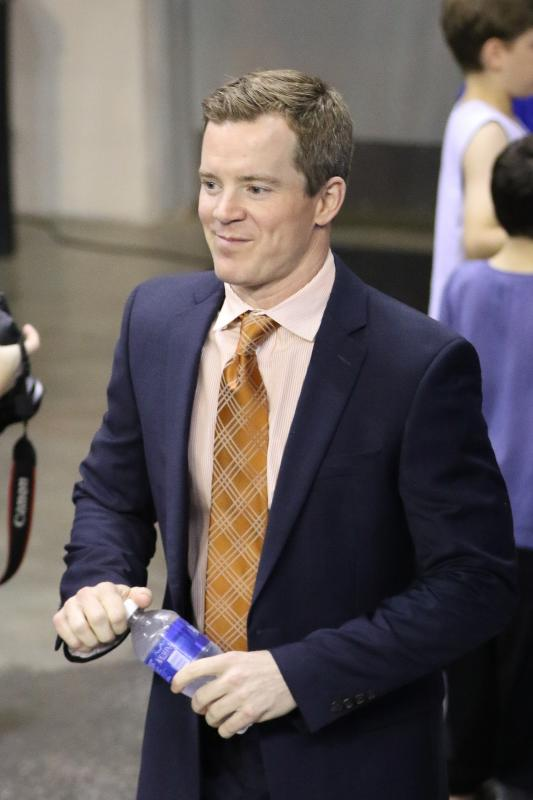
Dusty May is the winningest head coach in the history of Florida Atlantic Owls basketball. He coached six seasons at FAU from 2018 to 2024.

The following is a list of Florida Atlantic Owls men's basketball head coaches. There have been 10 head coaches of the Owls in their 34-season history.

Florida Atlantic's current head coach is John Jakus. He was hired as the Owls' head coach in March 2024, after spending 12 seasons at Baylor and Gonzaga.

No.	Tenure	Coach	Years	Record	Pct.
1	1988–1989	Lonnie Williams	1	9–19	.321
2	1989–1995	Tim Loomis	6	68–97	.412
3	1995–1999	Kevin Billerman	4	36–71	.336
4	1999–2005	Sidney Green	6	54–121	.309
5	2005–2006	Matt Doherty	1	15–13	.536
6	2006–2008	Rex Walters	2	31–33	.484
7	2008–2014	Mike Jarvis	6	76–112	.404
8	2014–2018	Michael Curry	4	39–84	.317
9	2018–2024	Dusty May	6	129–69	.652
10	2024–present	John Jakus	1	0–0	–
Totals		9 coaches	35 seasons	451–612	.424
Records updated through end of 2023–24 season Source
