= 2021 NCAA Division I men's basketball championship game =

American collegiate basketball game

2021 NCAA Division I men’s basketball championship game
National championship game
Baylor Bears	Gonzaga Bulldogs
Big 12	WCC
(27–2)	(31–0)
86	70
Head coach: Scott Drew	Head coach: Mark Few
- AP: 3
- Coaches: 3
- AP: 1
- Coaches: 1
	1st half	2nd half	Total
Baylor Bears	47	39	86
Gonzaga Bulldogs	37	33	70
- Date: April 5, 2021
- Venue: Lucas Oil Stadium, Indianapolis, Indiana
- MVP: Jared Butler, Baylor
- Favorite: Gonzaga by 4.5
- Referees: Randy McCall, Bo Boroski, Keith Kimble
- National anthem: Greater Indianapolis area front line workers and first responders

United States TV coverage
- Network: CBS
- Announcers: Jim Nantz, Bill Raftery, Grant Hill and Tracy Wolfson
- Nielsen Ratings: 9.39 (16.9 million viewers)

The 2021 NCAA Division I men's basketball championship game was the final game of the 2021 NCAA Division I men's basketball tournament.

The Baylor Bears were crowned as the national champion for the 2020–21 season after beating the then-undefeated Gonzaga Bulldogs, 86–70. The game was played on April 5, 2021, at Lucas Oil Stadium in Indianapolis, Indiana.

Gonzaga was the first team to enter the national championship game undefeated since Indiana State in 1979. Baylor became the second consecutive first-time NCAA champions following Virginia in 2019 (no tournament was held in 2020 due to the COVID-19 pandemic).

== Participants ==
The championship game matched Baylor with Gonzaga. It was the sixth meeting between the two teams; Gonzaga entered the game leading the all-time series 5–0, with the last meeting resulting in an 83–71 win for Gonzaga in the second round of the 2019 NCAA tournament on March 23, 2019. This was the first championship game since 2005 to feature the top two overall seeds in the tournament.

This was the second consecutive championship game where both teams were playing for their programs' first NCAA title. It was also the first championship game to feature two private schools since Duke defeated Butler in 2010.

=== Baylor Bears ===
Baylor, led by 18th-year head coach Scott Drew, finished the regular season with a record of 21–1, including wins over seven ranked teams. The Bears posted a 13–1 conference record, earning them the No. 1 seed in the Big 12 tournament, where they defeated No. 9 seed Kansas State in the quarterfinals before falling to No. 5 seed Oklahoma State in the semi-finals. They were awarded an at-large bid to the NCAA tournament and received the No. 1 seed in the South Regional. In the tournament, they defeated No. 16 seed Hartford and No. 9 seed Wisconsin to reach their fifth Sweet Sixteen. The Bears then defeated No. 5 seed Villanova and No. 3 seed Arkansas to win the South Regional and reach their third Final Four.

In the Final Four, Baylor soundly defeated No. 2 seed Houston, champions of the Midwest Regional, by a score of 78–59 to reach their second national title game; they entered seeking their first championship.

=== Gonzaga Bulldogs ===
Gonzaga, led by 22nd-year head coach Mark Few, finished the regular season with a perfect record of 24–0, including wins over four ranked teams. The Bulldogs posted a 15–0 conference record, earning them the No. 1 seed in the West Coast tournament, where they defeated No. 4 seed Saint Mary's and No. 2 seed BYU to win their 19th conference tournament championship. They received the No. 1 overall seed in the NCAA tournament and were placed in the West Regional. In the tournament, they defeated No. 16 seed Norfolk State and No. 8 seed Oklahoma to advance to their 11th Sweet Sixteen. Gonzaga then faced and defeated No. 5 seed Creighton and No. 6 seed USC to move to the Final Four for the second time.

In the Final Four, Gonzaga was matched up with No. 11 seed UCLA, the champions of the East Regional. A 3-point buzzer beater in overtime by Jalen Suggs won the game for the Bulldogs and gave Gonzaga their second national championship berth in program history; they entered seeking their first national title and the first unbeaten season in NCAA Division I men's basketball since Indiana in 1976.

== Game summary ==
After winning the jump ball, Baylor controlled much of the first half. The Bears jumped out to an early 9–0 lead with multiple baskets each from Davion Mitchell and Jared Butler before Gonzaga's Andrew Nembhard scored a free throw. Gonzaga's first field goal came nearly five minutes into the game, with Corey Kispert's three-pointer that narrowed the lead back to nine, after a Mitchell jumper pushed the lead to double digits. A layup by Jonathan Tchamwa Tchatchoua and a three-pointer by Butler pushed the lead to 12 points; shortly thereafter, a Drew Timme layup and a pair of Adam Flagler free throws kept the margin where it was, though it was extended to 15 within the next minute. Over the following several minutes, Baylor was able to take advantage of excellent offensive rebounding and Gonzaga turnovers to push the lead to 19, its highest point in the half and the largest deficit Gonzaga had faced all season. During the second part of the opening half, the game was much more even; Gonzaga was able to gradually chip away at the lead, with a last-second layup at the end of the half cutting the deficit to 10 at the break.

The second half started similarly to the first, though both teams came out scoring this time. The Bears increased their lead to 15 within the first two minutes, and Gonzaga again narrowed it to single digits momentarily with 14:30 to play. The teams traded scores for the next minute and a half, getting the score to 62–51 in favor of the Bears, before Baylor went on an 11–1 run, pushing the score to a game-high 20 points. Both teams began to see foul trouble affect them, as Baylor's Flo Thamba fouled out with 8:40 to play and Gonzaga's Timme was temporarily benched after accumulating four fouls shortly before. Baylor controlled the ball well throughout the half, committing their first second-half turnover with only eight minutes to play. The Bears kept the lead between 15 and 20 as the teams alternated scores over the remainder of the game. With around a minute to play, both teams substituted out most of their starters, and Baylor was able to run the remainder of the clock out to win their first national championship.

CBS

April 5, 2021
9:20 p.m. EDT

Report

#S1 Baylor Bears 86, #W1 Gonzaga Bulldogs 70
Scoring by half: 47–37, 39–33
Pts: Jared Butler - 22; Rebs: Mark Vital - 11; Asts: Jared Butler - 7	Pts: Jalen Suggs - 22; Rebs: Drew Timme - 5 Asts: Andrew Nembhard - 4

Lucas Oil Stadium, Indianapolis, Indiana
Referees: Randy McCall, Bo Boroski, Keith Kimble

Starters:			Pts	Reb	Ast
F	0	Flo Thamba	3	6	0
G	12	Jared Butler	22	3	7
G	45	Davion Mitchell	15	6	5
G	31	MaCio Teague	19	2	0
G	11	Mark Vital	6	11	2
Reserves:					
F	32	Zach Loveday	0	0	0
F	23	Jonathan Tchamwa Tchatchoua	6	2	1
F	32	Jordan Turner	0	0	0
G	4	LJ Cryer	0	0	0
G	10	Adam Flagler	13	2	2
G	24	Matthew Mayer	2	2	1
G	13	Jackson Moffatt	0	0	0
G	35	Mark Paterson	0	0	0
Head coach:
Scott Drew

Baylor	Gonzaga

Baylor	Statistics	Gonzaga
30/67 (45%)	Field goals	25/49 (51%)
10/23 (44%)	3-pt. field goals	5/17 (29%)
16/18 (89%)	Free throws	15/21 (71%)
16	Offensive rebounds	5
22	Defensive rebounds	17
38	Total rebounds	22
18	Assists	16
9	Turnovers	14
8	Steals	4
5	Blocks	3
19	Fouls	17

Starters:			Pts	Reb	Ast
F	2	Drew Timme	12	5	3
F	24	Corey Kispert	12	3	2
G	1	Jalen Suggs	22	1	3
G	3	Andrew Nembhard	9	4	4
G	11	Joël Ayayi	8	2	1
Reserves:					
F	33	Ben Gregg	0	0	0
F	22	Anton Watson	4	0	1
G	55	Dominick Harris	0	0	0
G	0	Julian Strawther	3	0	0
G	4	Aaron Cook Jr.	0	2	2
Head coach:
Mark Few

== Media coverage ==
The championship game was televised in the United States by CBS. Jim Nantz provided play-by-play, while Bill Raftery and Grant Hill provided color commentary. Tracy Wolfson served as the sideline reporter.

The broadcast was the least-watched national championship ever shown on broadcast television, as it pulled in 16.92 million viewers on CBS for an average rating of 9.4. This marked a 14% viewership decline from the last men's national championship broadcast, in 2019 between Virginia and Texas Tech.

== Aftermath ==
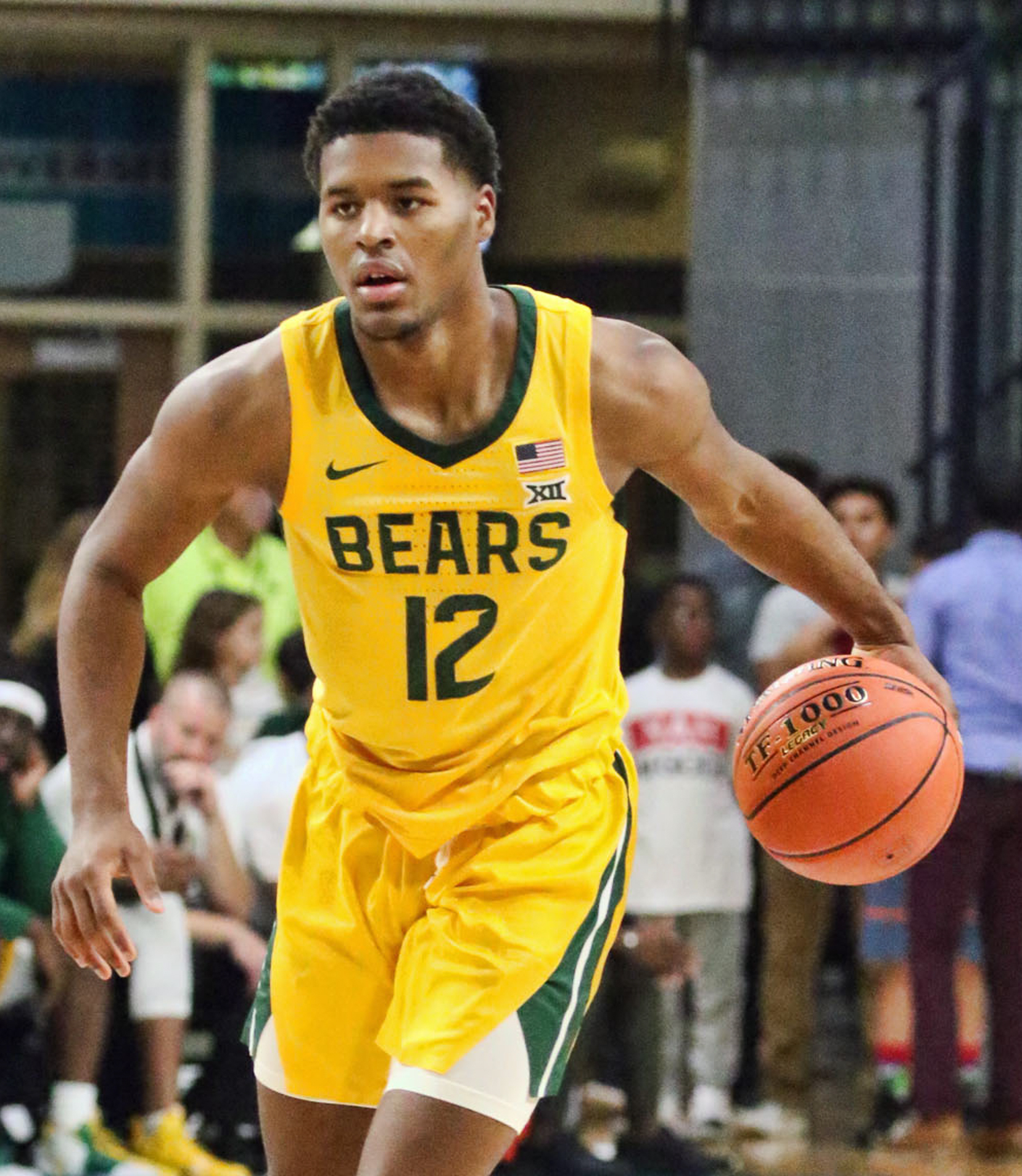
Jared Butler of Baylor was named the tournament's MOP

The win gave Baylor their first national championship in school history, and denied Gonzaga their first title and the first NCAA Division I men's basketball perfect season since Indiana in 1976. The loss was Gonzaga's first and only of the season, as they ended the year with a 31–1 record, while Baylor improved to 28–2 with the victory. After the game, Baylor coach Scott Drew was presented with the national championship trophy, and Bears guard Jared Butler was named the Most Outstanding Player of the NCAA tournament. Baylor's win was widely considered an upset, with Gonzaga considered a "massive favorite" to win the title by ESPN and Yahoo!'s platforms. Gonzaga never led during the game, and their 70 points were the fewest they had scored all season; the Bulldogs entered the championship averaging 91.6 points per game, the best in the nation. In addition, this was also Baylor's first win over Gonzaga in program history; they were 0–5 in previous meetings. Baylor also became the first team from the state of Texas to win the national championship since Texas Western in 1966.

== See also ==
- 2021 NCAA Division I women's basketball championship game
- 2021 NCAA Division I men's basketball tournament
