= Adam Flagler =

American basketball player (born 1999)

No. 14 – Texas Legends
- Position: Shooting guard
- League: NBA G League

Personal information
- Born: December 1, 1999 (age 26) Duluth, Georgia, U.S.
- Listed height: 6 ft 1 in (1.85 m)
- Listed weight: 180 lb (82 kg)

Career information
- High school: Duluth (Duluth, Georgia)
- College: Presbyterian (2018–2019); Baylor (2020–2023)
- NBA draft: 2023: undrafted
- Playing career: 2023–present

Career history
- 2023–2024: Oklahoma City Blue
- 2024–2025: Oklahoma City Thunder
- 2024–2025: →Oklahoma City Blue
- 2025–2026: Austin Spurs
- 2026–present: Texas Legends

Career highlights
- NBA champion (2025); NBA G League champion (2024); NCAA champion (2021); First-team All-Big 12 (2023); Second-team All-Big 12 (2022); Big South Freshman of the Year (2019); Big South All-Freshman Team (2019)
- Stats at NBA.com
- Stats at Basketball Reference

Adam Michael Flagler (born December 1, 1999) is an American professional basketball player for the Texas Legends of the NBA G League. He played college basketball for the Presbyterian Blue Hose and the Baylor Bears. Flagler was a member of the Bear's 2021 March Madness championship-winning team and with the Oklahoma City Thunder's 2025 NBA championship-winning team.

== High school career ==
Flagler grew up playing baseball, football and basketball. He played basketball at Duluth High School in Duluth, Georgia. Flagler left as the school's all-time leader in points (1,300) and three-pointers (227). He was a two-time all-county selection. He committed to playing college basketball for Presbyterian, the only NCAA Division I program to offer him a scholarship.

== College career ==
On November 19, 2018, Flagler scored a career-high 29 points, making seven three-pointers, in an 80–65 loss to UCLA. As a freshman at Presbyterian, he averaged 15.9 points and 3.4 rebounds per game, scoring the most points by a freshman in program Division I history. Flagler earned Big South Freshman of the Year honors and was a five-time Big South Freshman of the Week, a conference record. After the offseason departure of head coach Dustin Kerns, he transferred to Baylor and sat out for one year due to transfer rules. During his redshirt year, Flagler improved his all-around game by practicing against Jared Butler, Davion Mitchell and MaCio Teague. As a sophomore in 2021, he assumed a sixth man role for Baylor, which finished with a 28–2 record and won the first National championship in school history. Flagler averaged 9.1 points, 2.3 rebounds, and 1.4 assists per game. On February 19, 2022, he was ruled out due to a knee injury. Flagler was named to the Second Team All-Big 12. He averaged 13.8 points and 3.0 assists per game. Following the season, Flagler declared for the 2022 NBA draft, before returning to Baylor. As a senior, he was named to the First Team All-Big 12. After the 2023 season, Flagler declared for the NBA draft once again.

== Professional career ==
=== Oklahoma City Thunder / Blue (2023–2025) ===
After going undrafted in the 2023 NBA draft, Flagler signed with the Oklahoma City Thunder on October 19, 2023, but was waived the next day. On October 31, he joined the Oklahoma City Blue. On February 12, 2024, Flagler signed a two-way contract with the Thunder. He made two appearances for Oklahoma City during his rookie campaign, averaging 1.5 points and 2.0 assists.

Flagler made 37 appearances as a reserve for the Thunder during the 2024–25 NBA season, recording averages of 1.8 points, 0.7 rebounds, and 0.3 assists. Despite not appearing in the 2025 NBA playoffs due to his two-way contract, Flagler won his first NBA championship with the Thunder after they defeated the Indiana Pacers.

=== Austin Spurs (2025–2026) ===
On August 10, 2025, Flagler signed an Exhibit 10 contract with the San Antonio Spurs. He was waived by San Antonio prior to the start of the regular season on October 18. For the 2025–26 season, he was added to the roster of the Spurs' G League affiliate, the Austin Spurs.

=== Sacramento Kings (2026) ===
On July 1, 2026, Flagler signed a two-way contract with the Sacramento Kings. On October 19, he was waived by the Kings.

== Career statistics ==
Legend
GP	Games played	GS	Games started	MPG	Minutes per game
FG%	Field goal percentage	3P%	3-point field goal percentage	FT%	Free throw percentage
RPG	Rebounds per game	APG	Assists per game	SPG	Steals per game
BPG	Blocks per game	PPG	Points per game	**Bold**	Career high
†	Won an NBA championship

=== NBA ===
Year	Team	GP	GS	MPG	FG%	3P%	FT%	RPG	APG	SPG	BPG	PPG
2023–24	Oklahoma City	2	0	**7.0**	.143	.167	—	.0	**2.0**	.0	.0	1.5
2024–25†	Oklahoma City	**37**	0	5.5	**.260**	**.194**	**.500**	**.7**	.3	**.2**	**.1**	**1.8**
Career		39	0	5.6	.252	.192	.500	.7	.4	.2	.1	1.7

=== College ===
Year	Team	GP	GS	MPG	FG%	3P%	FT%	RPG	APG	SPG	BPG	PPG
2018–19	Presbyterian	**36**	**36**	30.7	.438	.386	.835	**3.4**	1.3	.8	**.3**	**15.9**
2019–20	Baylor	Redshirt										
2020–21	Baylor	28	0	22.8	**.454**	**.434**	**.872**	2.3	1.4	.9	.0	9.1
2021–22	Baylor	31	31	30.7	.438	.387	.741	2.2	3.0	1.1	.1	13.8
2022–23	Baylor	32	32	**33.8**	.426	.400	.790	2.4	**4.6**	**1.2**	.1	15.6
Career		129	99	29.7	.437	.396	.808	2.6	2.6	1.0	.1	13.8

== Personal life ==
Flagler's older brother, DuVaughn, played college football as a wide receiver at Gardner–Webb and is an elementary school principal. Another older brother, Alex, played college basketball at Coker College and Cumberland University.
