= Jerome Tang =

American basketball coach (born 1966)

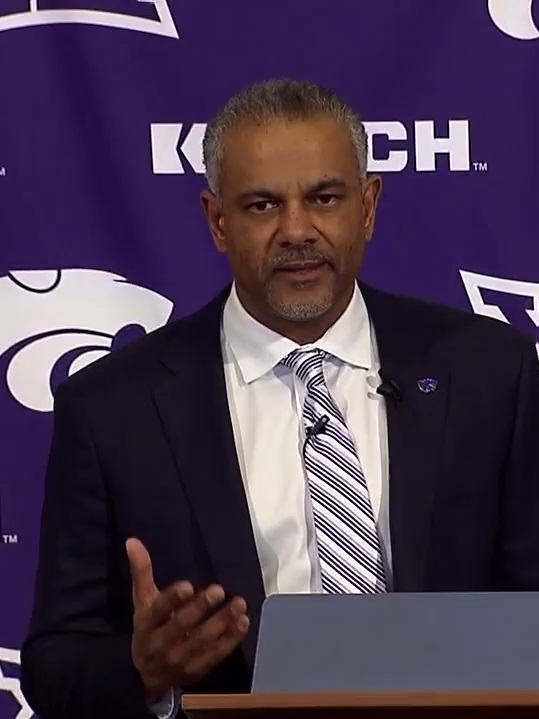
- Tang in 2022

Current position
- Title: Associate head coach
- Team: Baylor
- Conference: Big 12

Biographical details
- Born: October 7, 1966 (age 60); San Fernando, Trinidad and Tobago
- Education: Charter Oak State ('07)

Coaching career (HC unless noted)
- 1993–2003: Heritage Christian Academy (TX)
- 2003–2017: Baylor (assistant)
- 2017–2022: Baylor (associate HC)
- 2022–2026: Kansas State
- 2026–present: Baylor (associate HC)

Head coaching record
- Overall: 71–57 (.555)
- Tournaments: 3–1 (.750, NCAA Division I); 0–1 (.000, NIT)

Accomplishments and honors

Championships
- As assistant: NCAA Division I Tournament (2021)

Awards
- Naismith College Coach of the Year (2023); Big 12 Coach of the Year (2023); USBWA District VI Coach of the Year (2023); NABC District 8 Coach of the Year (2023)

Jerome Tang (born October 7, 1966) is a Trinidadian-American college basketball coach who is currently in his second stint as the associate head coach at Baylor University. Previously, he was the head coach at Kansas State University from 2022 to 2026. He had previously coached under Scott Drew from 2003 to 2022 at Baylor, where the Bears won the 2021 NCAA Championship.

== Early life ==
Tang was born in San Fernando, Trinidad and Tobago. He moved with his parents to St. Croix in the U.S. Virgin Islands, living there until age 10 when his family relocated to Texas. Tang first attended North Central Bible College in Minneapolis, Minnesota, and then studied at home via online learning with Charter Oak State College over the Internet, and earned a bachelor's degree in 2007.

== Coaching career ==
=== High school and assistant ===
Between 1993 and 2003, Tang served as head coach of Heritage Christian Academy in Cleveland, Texas, turning the team into a strong contender. While at Heritage Christian, he coached future NBA player Von Wafer. Tang was hired as an assistant coach at Baylor in 2003 under first-year coach Scott Drew. In 2017, Tang was promoted to associate head coach, and he helped lead Baylor to a national championship in 2021.

=== Kansas State ===
On March 21, 2022, Tang was named head coach of the Kansas State Wildcats, replacing the retiring Bruce Weber. Tang agreed to a six-year deal worth $14.1 million with the Wildcats. Led by Markquis Nowell and Keyontae Johnson, Tang's first season culminated in an NCAA Division I Elite Eight run. After the successful first season, Tang signed a new seven-year contract in September 2023, extending his deal through April 30, 2030, with annual salary increases starting at $3 million and retention bonuses. Despite significant financial investment in the program, Tang failed to replicate that success in the subsequent two seasons, missing the NCAA tournament two straight years. On February 15, 2026, Tang was fired by Kansas State. Kansas State claims they fired Tang "for-cause," on the basis that Tang's actions constituted "public disrepute, embarrassment, ridicule" to Kansas State. Immediately following the news of his termination, Tang signaled a likelihood of challenging the "for cause" termination.

== Personal life ==
Tang and his wife, Careylyen, have two children, son Seven and daughter Aylyn (pronounced 'island'). He is a Christian, and routinely begins press conferences by thanking his "Lord and Savior Jesus Christ." His father is of half-African and half-Chinese heritage, and his mother is Indian (of South Asian descent).

== Head coaching record ==
Record table
| Season | Team | Overall | Conference | Standing | Postseason |
|---|---|---|---|---|---|
Kansas State Wildcats (Big 12 Conference) (2022–2026)
| 2022–23 | Kansas State | 26–10 | 11–7 | 3rd | NCAA Division I Elite Eight |
| 2023–24 | Kansas State | 19–15 | 8–10 | T–9th | NIT First Round |
| 2024–25 | Kansas State | 16–17 | 9–11 | T–9th | |
| 2025–26 | Kansas State | 10–15 | 1–11 | (Note: Tang was dismissed with six games remaining in the regular season.) | |
| Kansas State: | | 71–57 (.555) | 29–39 (.426) | | |
| Total: | | 71–57 (.555) | | | |
National champion Postseason invitational champion Conference regular season champion Conference regular season and conference tournament champion Division regular season champion Division regular season and conference tournament champion Conference tournament champion
