= Jonathan Tchamwa Tchatchoua =

Cameroonian basketball player

Jonathan Tchatchoua
Free agent
- Position: Power forward

Personal information
- Born: 21 April 1999 (age 27) Yaoundé, Cameroon
- Listed height: 6 ft 8 in (2.03 m)
- Listed weight: 245 lb (111 kg)

Career information
- College: UNLV (2018–2019); Baylor (2020–2024)

Career highlights
- NCAA champion (2021); Big 12 Co-Defensive Player of the Year (2022); Big 12 All-Defensive Team (2022); Big 12 All-Newcomer Team (2021)

Jonathan Tchamwa Tchatchoua (born 21 April 1999) is a Cameroonian college basketball former player for the Baylor Bears of the Big 12 Conference. He previously played for the UNLV Runnin' Rebels.

== Early life and career ==
Tchatchoua grew up playing association football before switching to basketball at age 16. In 2015, he took part in a local camp held by Luc Mbah a Moute and was later invited to a Basketball Without Borders camp in Johannesburg. Two years later, Tchatchoua joined the NBA Global Academy in Australia, where he began learning English. He committed to playing college basketball in the United States for UNLV over offers from Gonzaga and St. John's.

== College career ==
As a freshman at UNLV, Tchatchoua averaged 3.4 points and 3.5 rebounds per game. After the season, he transferred to Baylor and sat out for one year due to transfer rules. Tchatchoua was nicknamed "Everyday Jon" by his teammates due to his work ethic. As a sophomore, he earned Big 12 All-Newcomer Team honors. Tchatchoua averaged 6.4 points and five rebounds per game on a team that won a national title. He scored a career-high 21 points on 9 February 2022, in a 75–60 win against Kansas State. On 12 February 2022, Tchatchoua suffered a knee injury during an 80–63 win over Texas. An MRI revealed damage to multiple ligaments, and he underwent season-ending surgery. As a junior, he averaged 8.4 points and 6.8 rebounds per game and won Big 12 Co-Defensive Player of the Year, alongside Oklahoma State's Moussa Cissé and West Virginia's Gabe Osabuohien.

== Career statistics ==
Legend
GP	Games played	GS	Games started	MPG	Minutes per game
FG%	Field goal percentage	3P%	3-point field goal percentage	FT%	Free throw percentage
RPG	Rebounds per game	APG	Assists per game	SPG	Steals per game
BPG	Blocks per game	PPG	Points per game	**Bold**	Career high

=== College ===
Year	Team	GP	GS	MPG	FG%	3P%	FT%	RPG	APG	SPG	BPG	PPG
2018–19	UNLV	**31**	**11**	13.3	.475	.000	.682	3.5	.2	.2	**.7**	3.4
2019–20	Baylor	Redshirt										
2020–21	Baylor	29	0	19.3	.576	–	.773	5.0	.4	.5	**.7**	6.4
2021–22	Baylor	25	0	**20.8**	**.677**	**.462**	.771	**6.8**	**.7**	**.7**	.4	**8.4**
2022–23	Baylor	12	0	18.5	.478	.429	**.846**	4.8	.5	.3	.3	5.1
2023–24	Baylor	19	2	5.5	.458	.400	n/a	1.2	.3	.1	.2	1.4
Career		116	13	15.7	.570	.400	.750	4.3	.4	.5	.6	5.1
