= Alvin Brooks III =

American basketball player and coach

Current position
- Title: Assistant coach
- Team: NC State
- Conference: ACC

Biographical details
- Born: September 11, 1979 (age 47); Houston, Texas, U.S.

Playing career
- 1998–2000: Midland
- 2000–2002: Idaho State
- Position: Point guard

Coaching career (HC unless noted)
- 2004–2006: Arkansas–Fort Smith (assistant)
- 2006–2007: Midland (assistant)
- 2007–2010: Bradley (assistant)
- 2010–2012: Sam Houston State (assistant)
- 2012–2016: Kansas State (assistant)
- 2016–2024: Baylor (associate HC)
- 2024–2026: Kentucky (associate HC)
- 2026–present: NC State (assistant)

Accomplishments and honors

Championships
- As assistant coach: NCAA Division I tournament (2021); 2 NJCAA Division I tournament (2006, 2007)

Alvin Joseph Brooks III (born September 11, 1979) is an American college basketball coach who is currently an assistant coach at North Carolina State University. Brooks is the son of current Lamar head coach Alvin Brooks.

== Early life and education ==
Born in Houston, Brooks played two seasons at Midland College from 1998 to 2000. Brooks helped the Midland Chaparrals finish sixth place in the 2000 National Junior College Athletic Association (NJCAA) Tournament.

Brooks transferred to Idaho State, where played under head coach Doug Oliver from 2000 to 2002. As a senior, Brooks earned Academic All-Big Sky Conference honors and graduated with a bachelor's degree in finance in 2002 followed by a master's degree in athletics administration in 2003.

== Career ==
Brooks began his career as a coach at the junior college level, starting as an assistant at Arkansas–Fort Smith from 2004 to 2006, including the 2006 NJCAA championship team. Brooks returned to Midland College as an assistant for the 2006–2007 season and helped them win the 2007 NJCAA championship. Brooks is the only assistant to be a part of back to back National Championships at two different schools.

In 2007, Brooks moved up to the Division I level as an assistant and recruiting at Bradley University under Jim Les. In three seasons at Bradley, Brooks helped Bradley advance to the final round of the 2008 College Basketball Invitational and win 20 or more games in two seasons. In 2010, Brooks left Bradley to be an assistant at Sam Houston State for head coach Jason Hooten.

After working four years as an assistant at Kansas State under Bruce Weber, Brooks left after the 2015–16 season for a similar role at Baylor under Scott Drew. Brooks helped lead Baylor to regular season titles in 2021 and 2022. Baylor finished up the 2020–2021 season with a run to the Final Four culminating in an NCAA National Championship victory. On April 24, 2024, Brooks accepted a contract to become the associate head coach at the University of Kentucky.
