= Davion Mitchell =

American basketball player (born 1998)

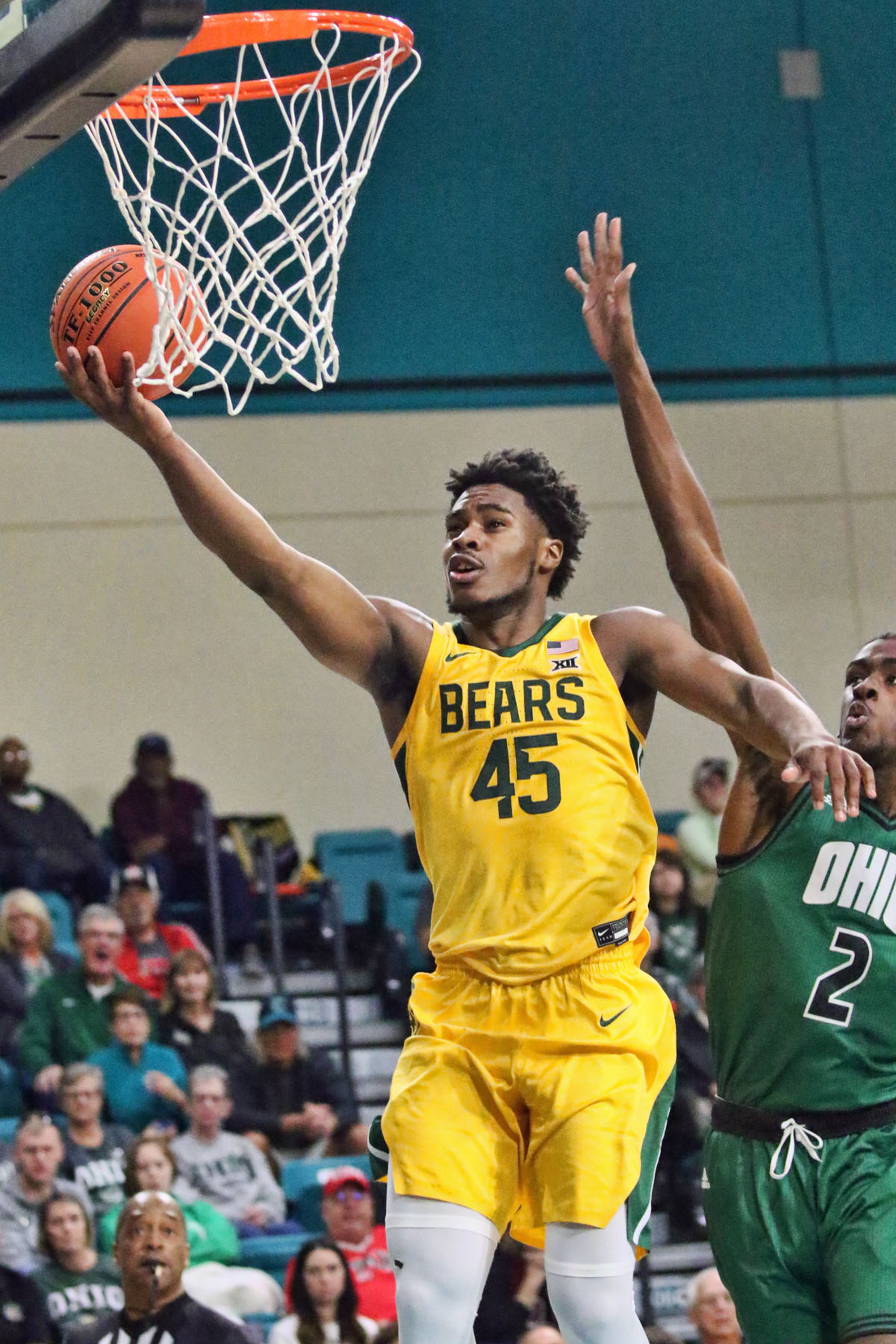
- Mitchell with Baylor in 2019

No. 2 – Miami Heat
- Position: Point guard
- League: NBA

Personal information
- Born: September 5, 1998 (age 28) Hinesville, Georgia, U.S.
- Listed height: 6 ft 0 in (1.83 m)
- Listed weight: 202 lb (92 kg)

Career information
- High school: Liberty County (Hinesville, Georgia)
- College: Auburn (2017–2018); Baylor (2019–2021)
- NBA draft: 2021: 1st round, 9th overall pick
- Drafted by: Sacramento Kings
- Playing career: 2021–present

Career history
- 2021–2024: Sacramento Kings
- 2024–2025: Toronto Raptors
- 2025–present: Miami Heat

Career highlights
- NCAA champion (2021); Naismith Defensive Player of the Year (2021); NABC Defensive Player of the Year (2021); Lefty Driesell Award (2021); Third-team All-American – AP, NABC, SN (2021); First-team All-Big 12 (2021); Third-team All-Big 12 (2020); Big 12 Defensive Player of the Year (2021); 2× Big 12 All-Defensive Team (2020, 2021); Big 12 Newcomer of the Year (2020); Big 12 All-Newcomer Team (2020)
- Stats at NBA.com
- Stats at Basketball Reference

Davion De'Monte Earl Mitchell (/ˈdeɪviˌɒn/ DAY-vee-on; born September 5, 1998), nicknamed Off-Night, is an American professional basketball player for the Miami Heat of the National Basketball Association (NBA). He played college basketball for the Auburn Tigers and the Baylor Bears. He was taken ninth overall in the 2021 NBA draft by the Sacramento Kings.

== Early life ==
Mitchell attended Liberty County High School in Hinesville, Georgia. As a junior, he averaged 24.2 points, 7.1 assists and 2.9 steals per game, leading his team to its first Class 4A state title. Mitchell was named Savannah Morning News Player of the Year. In his senior season, he averaged 23.8 points, 5.3 rebounds and 5.2 assists per game. Mitchell competed for the Georgia Stars on the Amateur Athletic Union circuit. A consensus four-star recruit, he committed to playing college basketball for Auburn over offers from Cincinnati, UConn, Florida, Georgia and Clemson, among others.

== College career ==
As a freshman at Auburn, Mitchell averaged 3.7 points and 1.9 assists per game as a backup point guard to Jared Harper. Following the season, he transferred to Baylor and sat out his next season due to NCAA transfer rules. During his redshirt year, he improved his all-around game and studied film on guards like Kyle Lowry and Jalen Brunson. During his sophomore season, Mitchell was a starter on one of the top teams in the nation. On December 18, 2019, he posted a season-high 19 points, four assists and four steals in a 91–63 win over UT Martin. As a sophomore, Mitchell averaged 9.9 points and 3.8 assists per game. He was named Big 12 Newcomer of the Year, while earning third-team All-Big 12, All-Defensive and All-Newcomer Team honors.

In his junior season, Mitchell became an improved shooter and passer. He scored a career-high 31 points and seven three-pointers in a 107–59 win over Kansas State on January 27, 2021. Mitchell helped Baylor win its first national championship, recording 15 points, six rebounds and five assists in an 86–70 win against previously undefeated Gonzaga in the title game. He received the Naismith Defensive Player of the Year Award, NABC Defensive Player of the Year award and the Lefty Driesell Award as the top defensive player in the nation. Mitchell earned Big 12 Defensive Player of the Year and first-team All-Big 12 honors. On April 13, he declared for the 2021 NBA draft, forgoing his remaining college eligibility.

== Professional career ==
=== Sacramento Kings (2021–2024) ===
Mitchell was selected with the ninth overall pick in the 2021 NBA draft by the Sacramento Kings. On August 5, 2021, he signed his rookie-scale contract with the Kings. Mitchell helped the Kings win the 2021 NBA Summer League championship and was named NBA Summer League MVP alongside Cam Thomas. Mitchell was also selected to the All-NBA Summer League First Team.

On October 20, 2021, Mitchell made his NBA debut, recording two points, three rebounds and three assists in a 124–121 win over the Portland Trail Blazers.

On March 20, 2022, he scored a career-high 28 points, alongside three rebounds and nine assists, in a 127–124 overtime loss to the Phoenix Suns. On April 5, Mitchell put up 15 points and a career-high 17 assists in a 123–109 loss to the New Orleans Pelicans. After De'Aaron Fox went down with a hand injury near the end of the season, Mitchell started in his place averaging 18.6 points and 8.9 assists on 45.8% shooting in 38.1 minutes played for those games.

In his second season, Mitchell's playing time and scoring decreased as his minutes were spread to new teammates, Malik Monk and Kevin Huerter.

=== Toronto Raptors (2024–2025) ===
On June 28, 2024, Mitchell, Sasha Vezenkov, the draft rights to Jamal Shead and a 2025 second-round draft pick were traded to the Toronto Raptors in exchange for Jalen McDaniels.

=== Miami Heat (2025–present) ===
On February 6, 2025, Mitchell was traded to the Miami Heat in a five-team trade, including Jimmy Butler to the Warriors. In 30 appearances (15 starts) for Miami, he averaged 10.3 points, 2.7 rebounds, and 5.3 assists. On April 20, during the first round of the playoffs, Mitchell recorded 18 points, four rebounds and nine assists in a 121–100 Game 1 loss to the Cleveland Cavaliers.

On July 8, 2025, Mitchell re-signed with the Heat on a two-year, $24 million contract.

On November 14, 2026, Mitchell put up 22 points and tied a career-high 17 assists in a 133–121 win over the Cleveland Cavaliers.

== Career statistics ==
Legend
GP	Games played	GS	Games started	MPG	Minutes per game
FG%	Field goal percentage	3P%	3-point field goal percentage	FT%	Free throw percentage
RPG	Rebounds per game	APG	Assists per game	SPG	Steals per game
BPG	Blocks per game	PPG	Points per game	**Bold**	Career high

=== NBA ===
==== Regular season ====
Year	Team	GP	GS	MPG	FG%	3P%	FT%	RPG	APG	SPG	BPG	PPG
2021–22	Sacramento	75	19	27.7	.418	.316	.659	2.2	4.2	**.7**	**.3**	**11.5**
2022–23	Sacramento	**80**	9	18.1	.454	.320	**.806**	1.3	2.3	.6	.2	5.6
2023–24	Sacramento	72	4	15.3	.452	.361	.714	1.3	1.9	.2	.0	5.3
2024–25	Toronto	44	22	24.5	.434	.359	.676	1.9	4.6	.7	.2	6.3
2024–25	Miami	30	15	**31.6**	**.504**	**.447**	.702	**2.7**	5.3	**1.4**	**.3**	10.3
2025–26	Miami	70	**70**	28.6	.490	.395	.646	**2.7**	**6.5**	1.0	.2	9.3
Career		371	139	23.3	.452	.355	.687	1.9	3.9	.7	.2	7.9

==== Playoffs ====
Year	Team	GP	GS	MPG	FG%	3P%	FT%	RPG	APG	SPG	BPG	PPG
2023	Sacramento	**7**	0	20.0	.413	.259	**.833**	1.3	1.7	**.9**	.1	7.1
2025	Miami	4	**3**	**35.5**	**.610**	**.500**	.429	**2.3**	**6.3**	.8	**.3**	**15.0**
Career		11	3	25.6	.506	.341	.615	1.6	3.4	.8	.2	10.0

=== College ===
Year	Team	GP	GS	MPG	FG%	3P%	FT%	RPG	APG	SPG	BPG	PPG
2017–18	Auburn	**34**	0	17.1	.429	.288	**.677**	1.1	1.9	.5	.0	3.7
2018–19	Baylor	Redshirt										
2019–20	Baylor	30	**30**	32.4	.409	.324	.663	**2.7**	3.8	1.5	**.4**	9.9
2020–21	Baylor	30	**30**	**33.0**	**.511**	**.447**	.652	**2.7**	**5.5**	**1.9**	**.4**	**14.1**
Career		94	60	27.1	.459	.376	.661	2.1	3.6	1.3	.2	9.0
