= Mark Vital =

American basketball player (born 1997)

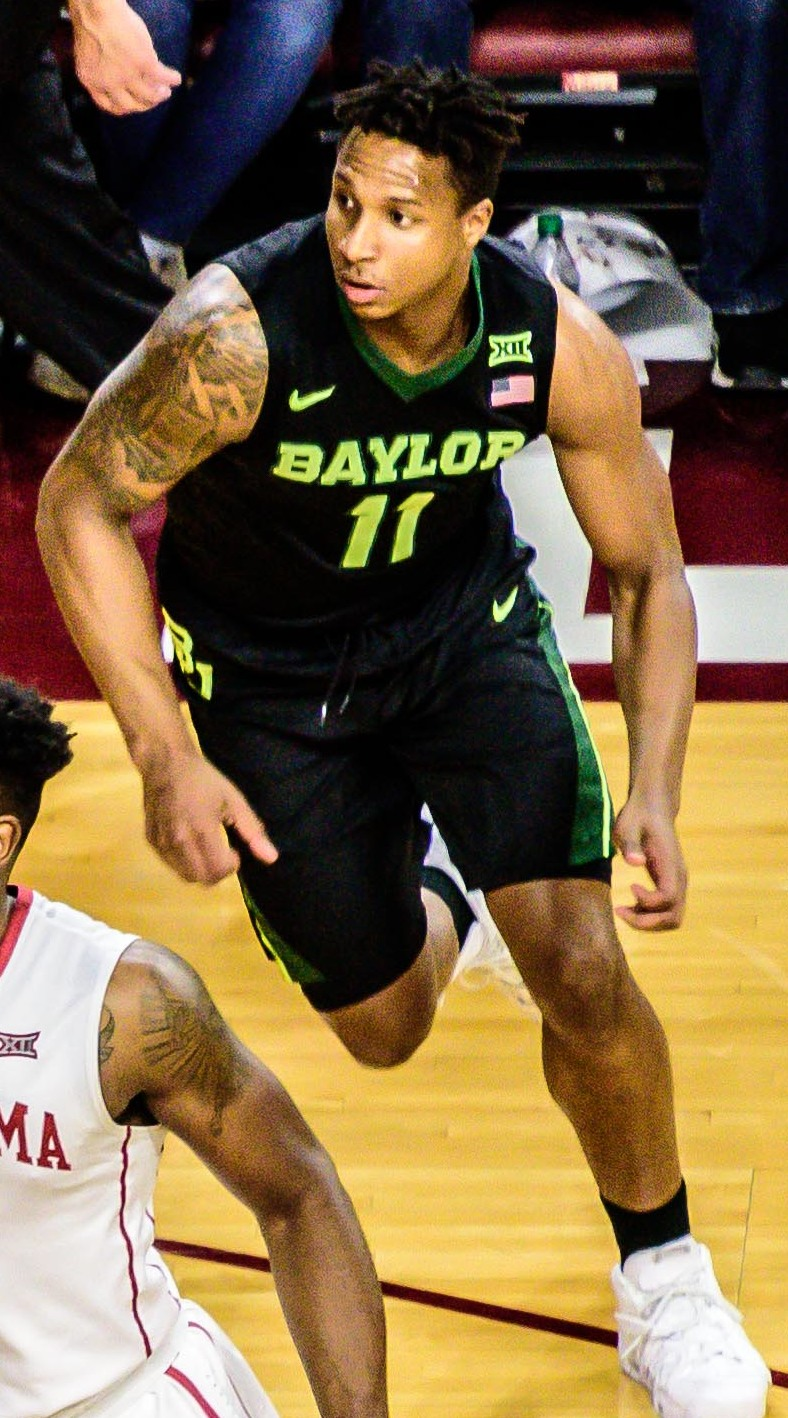
- Mark Vital on the Baylor Bears in 2018.

Free agent
- Position: Power forward

Personal information
- Born: November 7, 1997 (age 29) Lake Charles, Louisiana, U.S.
- Listed height: 6 ft 5 in (1.96 m)
- Listed weight: 250 lb (113 kg)

Career information
- High school: Advanced Prep International (Dallas, Texas)
- College: Baylor (2017–2021)
- NBA draft: 2021: undrafted
- Playing career: 2023–present

Career history
- 2023: Sudbury Five
- 2023–2024: Xezri Basketbol Komandasi
- 2024: Ángeles de la Ciudad de México

Career highlights
- NCAA champion (2021); Third-team All-Big 12 (2020); 3× Big 12 All-Defensive Team (2019–2021); Football career

Profile
- Position: Tight end

Career information
- NFL draft: 2021: undrafted

Career history
- Seattle Seahawks (2021)*; Kansas City Chiefs (2021–2022)*
- * Offseason or practice squad member only

Mark Vital Jr. (born November 7, 1997) is an American basketball player who last played for the Ángeles de la Ciudad de México of the Circuito de Baloncesto de la Costa del Pacífico (CIBACOPA). He played college basketball at Baylor University and won a national championship. After playing in the NBA Summer League with the Portland Trail Blazers, he decided to pursue a career in the National Football League.

== Early life ==
Vital was labeled "middle school basketball's most impressive dunker" by Yahoo Sports in June 2012. He gave up football to focus on basketball in eighth grade. Vital began high school at Washington-Marion Magnet High School in Lake Charles, Louisiana. As a sophomore, he averaged 16.5 points per game and was a Class 4A All-State selection.

For his final two years, Vital transferred to Advanced Preparatory International in Dallas, Texas, where he played alongside Terrance Ferguson. He competed for Southern Elite on the Amateur Athletic Union circuit. Vital committed to play college basketball for Baylor after his sophomore year of high school. At the end of his high school career, he was a four-star recruit and was considered the top player from Louisiana in the 2016 class by 247Sports.

== College career ==
Vital redshirted his first season at Baylor. While sitting out, he was a member of the practice squad and developed his offense by playing against Johnathan Motley and Ish Wainright. As a redshirt freshman, Vital averaged 6.7 points and 5.6 rebounds per game. On March 23, 2019, he recorded a career-high 17 points and eight rebounds in an 83–71 loss to first-seeded Gonzaga in the NCAA tournament second round. As a sophomore, Vital averaged 7.2 points, 7.2 rebounds and one steal per game, leading his team in rebounds and steals, and was named to the Big 12 All-Defensive Team and All-Big 12 Honorable Mention. On February 8, 2020, Vital scored a junior season-high 19 points in a 78–70 win against Oklahoma State. In his junior season, he helped Baylor become one of the best defensive teams in the nation. He averaged 9.1 points and 6.2 rebounds per game, earning Third-team All-Big 12 and Big 12 All-Defensive Team honors. He was one of four finalists for the Naismith Defensive Player of the Year Award. As a senior, Vital averaged 12.6 points and 6.7 rebounds per game, helping Baylor capture the national championship.

=== Career statistics ===
Legend
GP	Games played	GS	Games started	MPG	Minutes per game
FG%	Field goal percentage	3P%	3-point field goal percentage	FT%	Free throw percentage
RPG	Rebounds per game	APG	Assists per game	SPG	Steals per game
BPG	Blocks per game	PPG	Points per game	**Bold**	Career high

Year	Team	GP	GS	MPG	FG%	3P%	FT%	RPG	APG	SPG	BPG	PPG
2016–17	Baylor	Redshirt										
2017–18	Baylor	33	18	23.8	.481	.100	.505	5.6	**2.2**	.8	.6	6.7
2018–19	Baylor	**34**	**34**	**27.7**	.464	**.182**	**.529**	**7.2**	2.0	1.0	**.9**	**7.2**
2019–20	Baylor	29	24	26.1	.459	.118	.418	6.2	1.8	**1.7**	.6	6.1
2020–21	Baylor	30	30	23.4	**.483**	.000	.500	6.7	1.4	1.1	**.9**	5.6
Career		126	106	25.3	.471	.127	.496	6.4	1.8	1.1	.8	6.4

== Professional basketball career ==
After going undrafted in the 2021 NBA draft, Vital signed with the Portland Trail Blazers for NBA Summer League. On September 16, 2022, Vital returned to basketball and signed with Riesen Ludwigsburg of the Basketball Bundesliga. He was released on September 23.

In February 2024, Vital signed with the Ángeles de la Ciudad de México of the Circuito de Baloncesto de la Costa del Pacífico (CIBACOPA).

== Professional football career ==
=== Seattle Seahawks ===
After revealing he was planning on making the transition to football, on September 2, 2021, Vital signed with the Seattle Seahawks practice squad as a tight end. He was released on September 7.

=== Kansas City Chiefs ===
Vital signed with the Kansas City Chiefs practice squad on September 13, 2021. He signed a reserve/future contract with the Chiefs on February 2, 2022. He was released on July 28, 2022.
