= Matthew Mayer =

American basketball player (born 1999)

Free agent
- Position: Shooting guard / small forward

Personal information
- Born: September 23, 1999 (age 27) Dallas, Texas, U.S.
- Listed height: 6 ft 9 in (2.06 m)
- Listed weight: 225 lb (102 kg)

Career information
- High school: Westlake (Austin, Texas)
- College: Baylor (2018–2022); Illinois (2022–2023)
- NBA draft: 2023: undrafted
- Playing career: 2023–present

Career history
- 2023–2024: Rio Grande Valley Vipers
- 2024: Texas Legends

Career highlights
- NCAA champion (2021); Third-team All-Big Ten (2023)
- Stats at NBA.com
- Stats at Basketball Reference

Matthew Edward Mayer (born September 23, 1999) is an American professional basketball player who last played for the Texas Legends of the NBA G League. He played college basketball for the Baylor Bears and the Illinois Fighting Illini.

== High school career ==
Mayer attended Westlake High School in Austin, Texas, where he played alongside future NCAA Division I players Brock Cunningham, Keonte Kennedy and Will Baker. He committed to playing college basketball for Baylor over offers from Texas and Texas A&M, among others. Mayer was a consensus four-star recruit, according to major recruiting services.

== College career ==
Mayer had a limited role during his first two years at Baylor. In his junior season, he improved his efficiency and was a key contributor off the bench for the national champion Bears. Mayer grew a mullet upon the advice of his teammate Jackson Moffatt, who had the same hairstyle. Mayer averaged 8.1 points and 3.7 rebounds per game. Following the season, he declared for the 2021 NBA draft, but ultimately returned for his senior season. In his senior season, Mayer started all 33 games and averaged 9.8 points and 5.0 rebounds per game. He again declared for the NBA draft after the season, but later withdrew and announced he was transferring to Illinois. In his lone season at Illinois, Mayer was named third-team All-Big Ten by both coaches and media.

== Professional career ==
=== Rio Grande Valley Vipers (2023–2024) ===
After going undrafted in the 2023 NBA draft, Mayer joined the Houston Rockets for the 2023 NBA Summer League. He signed a contract with the Rockets on August 2, 2023, but was waived on October 17. On October 30, Mayer joined the Rio Grande Valley Vipers.

=== Texas Legends (2024) ===
On March 1, 2024, Mayer was traded to the Texas Legends in exchange for a 2024 second-round pick.

On July 11, 2024, Mayer signed with the Toyotsu Fighting Eagles Nagoya of the B.League. On September 13, his contract was terminated.

== Career statistics ==
Legend
GP	Games played	GS	Games started	MPG	Minutes per game
FG%	Field goal percentage	3P%	3-point field goal percentage	FT%	Free throw percentage
RPG	Rebounds per game	APG	Assists per game	SPG	Steals per game
BPG	Blocks per game	PPG	Points per game	**Bold**	Career high

=== College ===
Year	Team	GP	GS	MPG	FG%	3P%	FT%	RPG	APG	SPG	BPG	PPG
2018–19	Baylor	**33**	0	11.8	.331	.308	.660	2.0	.8	.5	.2	4.6
2019–20	Baylor	30	0	11.6	.422	.378	.690	1.9	.8	.5	.1	4.8
2020–21	Baylor	30	0	15.7	**.489**	**.395**	.592	3.7	1.0	**1.2**	.3	8.1
2021–22	Baylor	**33**	**33**	22.8	.409	.324	.700	5.0	1.0	**1.2**	.8	9.8
2022–23	Illinois	**33**	**33**	**26.5**	.407	.330	**.741**	**5.3**	**1.1**	0.8	**1.2**	**12.5**
Career		159	66	17.8	.413	.339	.689	3.6	.9	.8	.5	8.0
