= Flo Thamba =

Congolese basketball player

Free Agent
- Position: Power forward / center

Personal information
- Born: 25 February 1999 (age 27) DR Congo
- Listed height: 6 ft 10 in (2.08 m)
- Listed weight: 245 lb (111 kg)

Career information
- High school: Mountain Mission School (Grundy, Virginia)
- College: Baylor (2018–2023)
- NBA draft: 2023: undrafted
- Playing career: 2023–present

Career history
- 2023–2024: Jämtland Basket
- 2024–2025: ADA Blois
- 2025–2026: GTK Gliwice

Career highlights
- NCAA champion (2021)

Florent Thamba (born 25 February 1999) is a Congolese professional basketball player who last played for GTK Gliwice of the Polish Basketball League (PLK). He played college basketball for the Baylor Bears of the Big 12 Conference.

== Early life ==
Thamba was born in the Democratic Republic of the Congo and lived in England and France during his childhood before settling in South Africa. At age 16, he moved to the United States to attend Mountain Mission School in Grundy, Virginia, where he played basketball for three seasons. He committed to playing college basketball for Baylor over offers from Illinois, Virginia Tech and Nebraska.

== College career ==
Thamba came off the bench during his first two years at Baylor. As a freshman, he averaged 1.8 points and 2.2 rebounds per game. He averaged 2.3 points and 2.2 rebounds per game as a sophomore. In his junior season, Thamba became a starter for one of the top teams in the nation. He averaged 3.6 points and four rebounds per game, helping Baylor win its first NCAA tournament title. On 26 February 2022, Thamba scored a career-high 18 points in an 80–70 victory against Kansas.

== Professional career ==
On 7 July 2025 Thamba signed with GTK Gliwice of the Polish Basketball League.

== Career statistics ==
Legend
GP	Games played	GS	Games started	MPG	Minutes per game
FG%	Field goal percentage	3P%	3-point field goal percentage	FT%	Free throw percentage
RPG	Rebounds per game	APG	Assists per game	SPG	Steals per game
BPG	Blocks per game	PPG	Points per game	**Bold**	Career high

=== College ===
Year	Team	GP	GS	MPG	FG%	3P%	FT%	RPG	APG	SPG	BPG	PPG
2018–19	Baylor	**33**	0	10.0	.538	–	.533	2.2	**.3**	**.2**	.6	1.8
2019–20	Baylor	19	0	9.1	.481	–	.567	2.2	.1	.1	**.7**	2.3
2020–21	Baylor	30	**30**	**15.0**	**.563**	–	**.617**	**4.0**	.2	**.2**	**.7**	**3.6**
Career		82	30	11.6	.540	–	.579	2.8	.2	.2	.7	2.6

== Personal life ==
Thamba's father, Emmanual, works in customs in the Democratic Republic of the Congo. His older brother, Levy, fatally fell from a hotel balcony in 2014 after consuming a marijuana edible.
