= MaCio Teague =

American basketball player (born 1997)

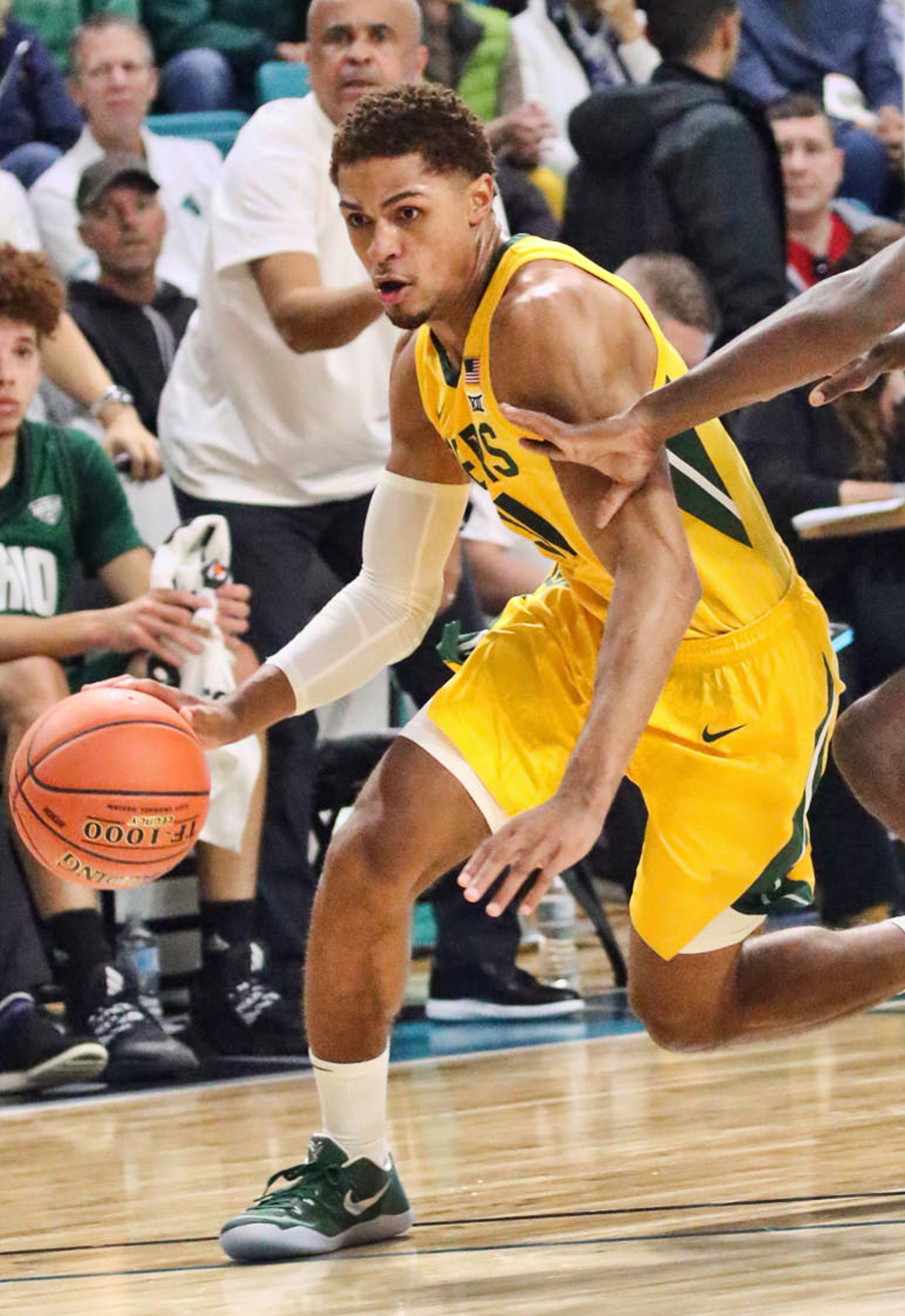
- Teague with Baylor in 2019

Free agent
- Position: Shooting guard

Personal information
- Born: June 11, 1997 (age 29) Cincinnati, Ohio, U.S.
- Listed height: 6 ft 4 in (1.93 m)
- Listed weight: 195 lb (88 kg)

Career information
- High school: Summit Country Day (Cincinnati, Ohio); Walnut Hills (Cincinnati, Ohio); Montverde Academy (Montverde, Florida)
- College: UNC Asheville (2016–2018); Baylor (2019–2021)
- NBA draft: 2021: undrafted
- Playing career: 2021–present

Career history
- 2021–2022: Salt Lake City Stars
- 2022–2023: Baskets Oldenburg
- 2023–2024: Czarni Słupsk
- 2024–2025: Bamberg Baskets
- 2025: Śląsk Wrocław

Career highlights
- NCAA champion (2021); Second-team All-Big 12 (2020); Third-team All-Big 12 (2021); Big 12 All-Newcomer Team (2020); 2× First-team All-Big South (2017, 2018); Big South Freshman of the Year (2017); Big South All-Freshman Team (2017)
- Stats at NBA.com
- Stats at Basketball Reference

MaCio Teague (born June 11, 1997) is an American professional basketball player who last played for Śląsk Wrocław of the Polish Basketball League (PLK). He played college basketball for the UNC Asheville Bulldogs and the Baylor Bears.

== High school career ==
As a sophomore at Summit Country Day School in Cincinnati, Ohio, Teague averaged 14.2 points per game. For his junior season, he transferred to Walnut Hills High School in Cincinnati, where he averaged 22.4 points per game in his first year. On January 19, 2015, as a senior, Teague scored a school-record 51 points in a 96–48 win over Piqua High School at the Flyin' to the Hoop Invitational. He scored the second-most single-game points in the event's history, behind only Byron Mullens. Teague finished the season averaging 26.4 points and 7.5 rebounds per game, leading the Ohio Division I in scoring. He was named Eastern Cincinnati Conference and District 16 Player of the Year, while earning Second Team All-State honors. Teague played a postgraduate season at Montverde Academy in Montverde, Florida to further develop and to gain more exposure.

== College career ==
=== UNC Asheville ===
On February 11, 2017, Teague scored a freshman season-high 30 points for UNC Asheville in a 91–69 win over Longwood. As a freshman, he averaged 15.4 points, 4.6 rebounds and 2.7 assists per game and was named Big South Freshman of the Year while earning First Team All-Big South honors. Teague became the seventh player in conference history to record at least 500 points in his freshman season. On February 1, 2018, he scored a career-high 36 points and made seven three-pointers in a 64–57 victory over Campbell. As a sophomore, Teague averaged 16.7 points, 4.4 rebounds, 2.5 assists and 1.6 steals per game, leading the Big South by shooting 42.5 percent from three-point range. He was named to the First Team All-Big South for his second consecutive year. After the season, he received his release to transfer from UNC Asheville.

=== Baylor ===
On April 30, 2018, Teague announced that he would continue his college career with Baylor over offers from Louisville, Virginia and Xavier. He sat out the following season due to National Collegiate Athletic Association transfer rules and was a member of the team's practice squad. He made his debut for Baylor on November 5, 2019, scoring 18 points and collecting 10 rebounds in a 105–61 win over Central Arkansas. On February 8, 2020, Teague scored a junior season-high 24 points, including six straight free throws in the final 14 seconds, in a 78–70 win over Oklahoma State. As a junior, he averaged 13.9 points and 4.6 rebounds in a team-high 32.6 minutes per game, helping Baylor achieve a 26–4 record. Teague was named to the Second Team All-Big 12 and was a unanimous Big 12 All-Newcomer Team selection. After the season, he declared for the 2020 NBA draft, before withdrawing and returning to Baylor. On March 7, 2021, Teague scored 35 points, shooting 10-of-12 from three-point range, in an 88–73 win over Texas Tech. His 10 three-pointers tied for the most in program history and the second-most in Big 12 history. Baylor entered the 2021 NCAA tournament with a 1-seed and went on to win the national championship, finishing with a 28–2 record. In the tournament, Teague averaged nearly 15 points per game, including 22 points in the opening round against Hartford and the regional final against Arkansas, both of which led the team, and 19 points in the championship game victory over Gonzaga. He averaged 15.9 points and 4.0 rebounds per game on the season.

== Professional career ==
After going undrafted in the 2021 NBA draft, Teague signed with the Utah Jazz on August 15, 2021. He was waived prior to the start of the season. In October 2021, Teague joined the Salt Lake City Stars as an affiliate player. However, he was waived on March 22, 2022, after suffering a season-ending injury.

On July 29, 2022, Teague signed a contract with Baskets Oldenburg of the Basketball Bundesliga.

On August 1, 2023, he signed with Czarni Słupsk of the Polish Basketball League.

On February 10, 2025, he signed with Śląsk Wrocław of the Polish Basketball League (PLK).

== Career statistics ==
Legend
GP	Games played	GS	Games started	MPG	Minutes per game
FG%	Field goal percentage	3P%	3-point field goal percentage	FT%	Free throw percentage
RPG	Rebounds per game	APG	Assists per game	SPG	Steals per game
BPG	Blocks per game	PPG	Points per game	**Bold**	Career high

=== College ===
Year	Team	GP	GS	MPG	FG%	3P%	FT%	RPG	APG	SPG	BPG	PPG
2016–17	UNC Asheville	33	**32**	34.1	.468	**.455**	**.886**	**4.6**	**2.7**	1.1	.2	15.4
2017–18	UNC Asheville	**34**	**32**	**35.3**	.418	.425	.866	4.4	2.5	**1.6**	.1	**16.7**
2018–19	Baylor	Redshirt										
2019–20	Baylor	28	28	32.6	.400	.355	.848	**4.6**	1.9	1.0	.2	13.9
2020–21	Baylor	30	30	31.7	**.478**	.395	.827	4.0	1.7	.8	**.4**	15.8
Career		125	122	33.5	.442	.408	.860	4.4	2.2	1.1	.2	15.5
