= John Jakus =

American basketball coach (born 1975)

- Jakus at Florida Atlantic in 2026

Current position
- Title: Head coach
- Team: Florida Atlantic
- Conference: The American
- Record: 36–31 (.537)

Biographical details
- Born: October 9, 1975 (age 51)
- Education: Trinity International University (1999); Baylor University (2014)

Coaching career (HC unless noted)
- 2004–2008: Cincinnati Hills Christian Academy
- 2005–2008: Athletes in Action (VHC)
- 2008–2014: Athletes in Action
- 2008–2009: Agape Bulgaria
- 2010–2011: ABA Strumica
- 2012–2014: Baylor (GA)
- 2017–2022: Baylor (assistant)
- 2022–2024: Baylor (associate)
- 2024–present: Florida Atlantic

Administrative career (AD unless noted)
- 2008–2014: Athletes in Action (director)
- 2010–2011: ABA Strumica (AGM)
- 2014–2017: Gonzaga (DBO)

Head coaching record
- Overall: 36–31 (.537)
- Tournaments: 0–1 (NIT)

John Walter Jakus (born October 9, 1975) is an American basketball coach who is the current head coach of the Florida Atlantic Owls men's basketball team.

== Early life ==
Jakus was born in Chicago but grew up in Johnsburg, Illinois. He attended Trinity International University in Deerfield, Illinois, where he received an undergraduate degree in religious studies in 1999, and later received a master's degree in sports management at Baylor University in 2014.

== Coaching career ==
Jakus coached at Cincinnati Hills Christian Academy from 2004 to 2008, having a winning percentage of .810 in four years as head coach. He worked with the organization Athletes in Action (AIA) as a volunteer head coach for National Collegiate Athletic Association (NCAA) and professional trips from 2005 to 2008. In 2008, he volunteered as a head coach for AIA in a trip to Bulgaria.

Jakus became a full-time coach and director for AIA afterwards and also began coaching the team Agape Bulgaria. He also served as team chaplain with Agape Bulgaria. He served with the team through 2009, and in 2010 became the head coach and assistant general manager of ABA Strumica in Macedonia. He served in the position until 2011 and helped the team earn a promotion to the top division. He continued working with AIA through 2014.

Jakus returned to the U.S. in 2012 to care for his son, who was diagnosed with autism. He accepted a coaching position that year as graduate assistant for the Baylor Bears, remaining in the role for two seasons. He left the team following the 2013–14 season and became the director of basketball operations for the Gonzaga Bulldogs. Jakus served three seasons at Gonzaga and helped them reach the national championship in 2017. He returned to Baylor after the season to become an assistant coach. He was an assistant coach at Baylor for seven seasons, assisting as they won the national championship in 2021 and won Big 12 Conference titles in 2021 and 2022. Jakus was promoted to associate head coach prior to the 2022-23 season.

Jakus was named the head coach of the Florida Atlantic Owls on March 27, 2024.

== Head coaching record ==
Record table
Season	Team	Overall	Conference	Standing	Postseason
Florida Atlantic Owls (American Athletic) (2024–Present)
2024–25	Florida Atlantic	18–16	10–8	T–5th	NIT first round
2025–26	Florida Atlantic	18–15	9–9	T–5th	
Florida Atlantic:		36–31 (.537)	19–17 (.528)		
Total:		36–31 (.537)			
National champion Postseason invitational champion Conference regular season champion Conference regular season and conference tournament champion Division regular season champion Division regular season and conference tournament champion Conference tournament champion

== Personal life ==
Jakus was born in Chicago, Illinois to John and Donna Jakus. He grew up in Johnsburg, Illinois and is the oldest of four children. John and his wife, Sara, have three children, sons Brady and Cal, and daughter Harper. John is a Christian and started his basketball coaching career as a missionary.
