= Scott Drew =

American basketball player and coach (born 1970)

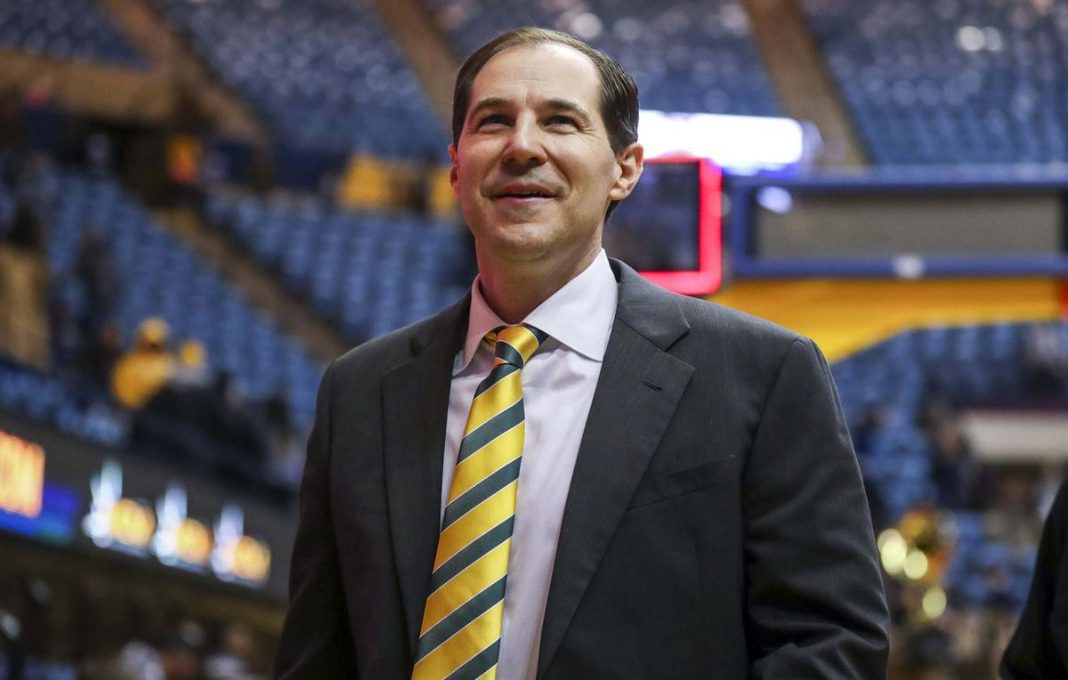
- Drew in 2019

Current position
- Title: Head coach
- Team: Baylor
- Conference: Big 12
- Record: 487–277 (.637)
- Annual salary: $2,768,154

Biographical details
- Born: October 23, 1970 (age 56); Kansas City, Missouri, U.S.
- Education: Butler ('93)

Coaching career (HC unless noted)
- 1991–1993: Butler (student manager)
- 1993–2002: Valparaiso (assistant)
- 2002–2003: Valparaiso
- 2003–present: Baylor

Head coaching record
- Overall: 506–288 (.637)
- Tournaments: 21–11 (NCAA Division I); 10–3 (NIT); 1–1 (CBC)

Accomplishments and honors

Championships
- NCAA Division I tournament (2021); NCAA regional—Final Four (2021); NIT (2013); 2 Big 12 regular season (2021, 2022); Mid-Con regular season (2003)

Awards
- 3× Big 12 Coach of the Year (2020–2022)

Scott Homer Drew (born October 23, 1970) is an American college basketball coach who is the head coach at Baylor University, a position he has held since 2003.

Drew began his coaching career as an assistant for Valparaiso under his father Homer Drew. Following his father's retirement in 2002, Drew would serve as the head coach of Valparaiso for one season before being hired by Baylor in 2003. Drew took over Baylor as a program in ruins, following decades of mediocre-to-poor performance and a public scandal that resulted in numerous NCAA sanctions. After four seasons rebuilding the program, Drew turned Baylor from a program with only one NCAA tournament appearance since 1950 into a perennial tournament contender; since their first tournament under Drew in 2008, they have made it back eleven further times as of 2024. The team won their first basketball championship under Drew with the 2013 National Invitation Tournament. In 2021, Drew would lead Baylor to a Big 12 regular season championship (their first conference title in 71 years), a 28–2 record and their first ever NCAA championship. Drew's turnaround at Baylor is considered by many to be one of the best in the history of college sports.

== Coaching career ==
=== Valparaiso ===
Drew graduated from Butler University in 1993 with a bachelor's degree in liberal arts. While at Butler he was a member of Delta Tau Delta International Fraternity. Although he never played college basketball at the varsity level, Drew spent two years as a student assistant for the men's basketball team, and also played on the men's tennis team but did not earn a letter.

Afterwards, Drew assumed an assistant coaching position with the Valparaiso University Crusaders men's team under his father Homer Drew. He spent nine years in this position, during which he earned a master's degree from Valparaiso and a reputation as one of the best recruiters in the nation. Once the elder Drew retired, he became the team's head coach for one year. In that year, Valparaiso won the regular-season conference championship, but lost to IUPUI in the Mid-Continent Conference tournament, thus losing the bid to the NCAA tournament. However, the team proceeded to earn an NIT bid. When Drew went to Baylor, his father came out of retirement to coach Valpo.

=== Baylor ===
On August 22, 2003, Drew took the head coaching position of the men's team at Baylor University after the resignation of Dave Bliss due to scandal. This was unusually late for a coaching change; practice was only two months away and the season opener was only three months away.

Drew later told Yahoo! Sports that he won over school president Robert B. Sloan and the search committee by "telling them what I believed could happen and where Baylor could go." He outlined his plan for what was described as "perhaps the most daunting rebuilding job in college basketball history." He even went as far as creating mock posters showing the Bears winning multiple Big 12 Conference titles and going to multiple Final Fours. At the time, this was an outlandish notion for a program that was considered "radioactive" in the wake of the scandal; Drew was one of the few coaches who expressed interest. He believed Baylor would be patient with him and give him the time to build the program as he saw fit. Even before the scandal, Baylor's history had been undistinguished. The Bears had only been to four NCAA Tournaments in their entire history, the last appearance being in 1988.

Drew took over a program left in shambles due to the scandal. Nearly every top player from the 2002–03 Bears had transferred after school officials granted a full release to every player on the team. Additionally, Baylor had placed itself on probation until 2005 and withdrawn from postseason play for the 2003–04 season. Drew led a decimated roster to an 8–21 record in his first season.

Shortly after Drew's first season, Baylor extended its self-imposed probation until 2006 and docked itself several scholarships and paid recruiting visits through 2006. The NCAA imposed further sanctions in 2005, extending Baylor's probation until 2010, docking the Bears three paid visits in 2006–07 and banning the Bears from non-conference play in the 2005–06 season. With these handicaps, Drew led the Bears to 9–19 in the 2004–05 season, and 4–13 in the conference-only 2005–06 season. The Bears showed signs of respectability in 2006–07, finishing 15–16; they had only won 21 games in the previous three seasons combined.

In the 2007–08 season, Drew turned around his Bears to finish with a 21–9 regular-season record. They finished fourth in the Big 12 with a 9–7 record. The 21 overall wins and 9 conference wins were Baylor's best since joining the Big 12 in 1996; additionally. It was enough to make the NCAA tournament for only the fifth time in school history and the first time since 1988. At the end of the regular season, when Drew made an appearance on the sports show Pardon The Interruption (PTI), host Tony Kornheiser suggested on the air that Drew be voted "unanimous coach of the year." After the season, Drew signed a 10-year contract extension.

Prior to the 2008–09 season, a Rivals.com writer called Drew the Big 12 "coach on the rise" due to Drew's success in recruiting talent to Baylor. The Big 12 coaches picked Drew's squad to finish fourth in the conference.

In 2010, after finishing tied for second in the Big 12 with a squad picked to finish tenth in the preseason poll, Drew was elected the Austin American Statesman's Coach of the Year. That year he went on to beat the Texas Longhorns three straight times. He went on in the same year to enjoy an NCAA Sweet 16 berth, making him and his father Homer Drew one of the few father and son coaches to accomplish such feat. The team then made it to the Elite 8 before losing to the national championship-winning Duke Blue Devils. It was the Bears' deepest tournament run since going to the Final Four in 1950; indeed, it was the first time since then that they had won a tournament game.

In 2011, Drew led Baylor to an 18–13 overall record and a seventh-place finish in the Big 12. In the first round of the Big 12 tournament, Baylor lost to Oklahoma. Hours before the game, Baylor was informed that star player, Perry Jones III, would not be allowed to play for accepting impermissible benefits, a decision that was later reversed. The team did not participate in a postseason tournament.

In 2011–12, the Bears started the season 17–0 and rose to third in the AP Poll and the coaches' poll—the highest weekly rankings in school history at that time. However, Baylor finished the regular season on an 8–6 run and finished in a tie for third in the Big 12. In the Big 12 tournament, they defeated No. 3-ranked Kansas in the semifinals, but lost to Missouri in the championship game. They received an at-large bid to the NCAA tournament, where they advanced to the Elite Eight before losing to Kentucky. The loss marked the second time in three seasons that the Bears' season ended at the hands of the eventual national champions. The 30 wins that season were a school record.

In April 2012, the NCAA put the Baylor men's and women's basketball programs on three years probation and implemented scholarship reductions after an investigation revealed major recruiting violations and impermissible involvement of talent scouts at the basketball clinics they hosted. It was also revealed that one of Drew's assistant coaches had attempted to influence two AAU coaches to provide false and misleading information during the investigation. Drew, who issued a statement accepting full responsibility for the infractions, was cited for failure to monitor the men's program and suspended by the Big 12 for the first two conference games in the 2012–13 season.

During the 2012–13 season, Baylor fell to 23–14, 9–9 in Big 12 play to finish in sixth place. An early loss in the Big 12 tournament resulted in the Bears failing to get an invitation to the NCAA tournament. They accepted a bid to the NIT where they would advance to the championship game and defeat Iowa to win the NIT.

In 2013–14, Drew won his 202nd game at Baylor, vaulting him past Bill Henderson to become the winningest coach in Baylor history. The Bears finished with a 26–12 record, again finishing in sixth place in the Big 12. However, they advanced to the Big 12 tournament championship with three straight wins, including a win over No. 17-ranked Oklahoma, before losing to No. 16-ranked Iowa State. They received an at-large bid to the NCAA tournament as a 6 seed. In the tournament, they defeated Nebraska and Creighton, before losing to Wisconsin in the Sweet Sixteen.

The following year, the Bears finished 24–10, 11–7 to finish in fourth place in Big 12 play. They lost in the semifinals of the Big 12 tournament to No. 9 Kansas and received an at-large bid to the NCAA tournament. As a No. 3 seed, they were upset by No. 14-seeded Georgia State in the second round (formerly the first round).

A third straight trip to the NCAA tournament followed in 2016, but another early exit followed the Bears 22–12 campaign. An upset by No. 12-seeded Yale knocked the Bears out of the tournament in the first round.

In 2016–17, the Bears began the season 15–0 and led to a No. 1 in the country for the first time in Baylor history. However, in their first game as No. 1, they lost to No. 10-ranked West Virginia. Later in the season Baylor would beat West Virginia at home to notch their fourth win over a top 10 team on the season. Baylor was an at-large 3-seed to the NCAA tournament, losing in the Sweet 16.

In 2020–21, Drew and the Bears won the school's first Big 12 regular season title, and first regular season conference title of any sort since 1950. They spent most of the season No. 2 in the AP poll behind Gonzaga. The two teams met in the championship game, where the Bears won 86–70 over the previously undefeated Bulldogs for Baylor's first ever national championship.

In 2022, Baylor finished tied with Kansas for first place in the Big 12. The Bears earned a 1 seed in the NCAA tournament but were upset in the round of 32 by North Carolina.

== Personal life ==
Drew is a Christian and is married to Kelly Drew. The couple have one daughter named Mackenzie and two sons named Peyton and Brody.

Drew's brother, Bryce Drew, is the head coach of the Grand Canyon Antelopes men's basketball team at Grand Canyon University.

== Head coaching record ==
Record table
Season	Team	Overall	Conference	Standing	Postseason
Valparaiso Crusaders (Mid-Continent Conference) (2002–2003)
2002–03	Valparaiso	20–11	12–2	1st	NIT Opening Round
Valparaiso:		20–11 (.645)	12–2 (.857)		
Baylor Bears (Big 12 Conference) (2003–present)
2003–04	Baylor	8–21	3–13	11th	
2004–05	Baylor	9–19	1–15	12th	
2005–06	Baylor	4–13	4–12	12th	
2006–07	Baylor	15–16	4–12	11th	
2007–08	Baylor	21–11	9–7	T–4th	NCAA Division I Round of 64
2008–09	Baylor	24–15	5–11	9th	NIT Runner-Up
2009–10	Baylor	28–8	11–5	T–2nd	NCAA Division I Elite Eight
2010–11	Baylor	18–13	7–9	T–7th	
2011–12	Baylor	30–8	12–6	T–3rd	NCAA Division I Elite Eight
2012–13	Baylor	23–14	9–9	T–4th	NIT Champion
2013–14	Baylor	26–12	9–9	T–6th	NCAA Division I Sweet 16
2014–15	Baylor	24–10	11–7	T–4th	NCAA Division I Round of 64
2015–16	Baylor	22–12	10–8	T–5th	NCAA Division I Round of 64
2016–17	Baylor	27–8	12–6	T–2nd	NCAA Division I Sweet 16
2017–18	Baylor	19–15	8–10	T–6th	NIT Second Round
2018–19	Baylor	20–14	10–8	4th	NCAA Division I Round of 32
2019–20	Baylor	26–4	15–3	2nd	Postseason cancelled due to COVID-19
2020–21	Baylor	28–2	13–1	1st	NCAA Division I Champion
2021–22	Baylor	27–7	14–4	T–1st	NCAA Division I Round of 32
2022–23	Baylor	23–11	11–7	T–3rd	NCAA Division I Round of 32
2023–24	Baylor	24–11	11–7	T–3rd	NCAA Division I Round of 32
2024–25	Baylor	20–15	10–10	T–7th	NCAA Division I Round of 32
2025–26	Baylor	17–17	6–12	T–13th	CBC Semifinal
2026–27	Baylor	4–1	0–0		
Baylor:		487–277 (.637)	203–196 (.509)		
Total:		506–288 (.637)			
National champion Postseason invitational champion Conference regular season champion Conference regular season and conference tournament champion Division regular season champion Division regular season and conference tournament champion Conference tournament champion
