= 2021–22 Kansas Jayhawks men's basketball team =

U.S. collegiate team

2021–22 Kansas Jayhawks men's basketball

NCAA tournament National Champions Big 12 tournament champions Big 12 regular season co-champions

National Championship Game, W 72–69 vs. North Carolina
- Conference: Big 12 Conference

Ranking
- Coaches: No. 1
- AP: No. 3
- Record: 34–6 (14–4 Big 12)
- Head coach: Bill Self (19th season)
- Assistant coaches: Jeremy Case (1st season); Norm Roberts (11th season); Kurtis Townsend (18th season)
- Home arena: Allen Fieldhouse

2021–22 Big 12 men's basketball standings
	Conf.				Overall
Team	W		L	PCT	W		L	PCT
No. 3 Kansas †	14	–	4	.778	34	–	6	.850
No. 4 Baylor	14	–	4	.778	27	–	7	.794
No. 12 Texas Tech	12	–	6	.667	27	–	10	.730
No. 25 Texas	10	–	8	.556	22	–	12	.647
TCU	8	–	10	.444	21	–	13	.618
Oklahoma State*	8	–	10	.444	15	–	15	.500
Iowa State	7	–	11	.389	22	–	13	.629
Oklahoma	7	–	11	.389	19	–	16	.543
Kansas State	6	–	12	.333	14	–	17	.452
West Virginia	4	–	14	.222	16	–	17	.485
† 2022 Big 12 Tournament winner *Oklahoma State was ineligible for both the 2022 Big 12 Tournament and the 2022 NCAA tournament due to postseason ban imposed by the NCAA. Rankings from AP poll

The 2021–22 Kansas Jayhawks men's basketball team represented the University of Kansas in the 2021–22 NCAA Division I men's basketball season, which was the Jayhawks' 124th basketball season. The Jayhawks, members of the Big 12 Conference, played their home games at Allen Fieldhouse in Lawrence, Kansas. They were led by 19th year Hall of Fame head coach Bill Self. The Jayhawks finished the season 34–6 and won their 4th NCAA Tournament National Championship, their first since 2008, and their 6th National Championship overall.

== Season notes ==
The Jayhawks experienced massive roster turnover in the offseason having lost eight players to transfers, graduation, and entering the draft, but added a recruiting class ranked in the top 15 of every major recruiting website, and 4 transfers. They had more new players on their roster than returning players. Despite the turnover, the Jayhawks entered the season with high expectations. Joe Lunardi of ESPN projected them as a 1 seed in his initial 2022 NCAA tournament bracketology. The Jayhawks renewed their rivalry with Missouri on December 11. The Jayhawks defeated Missouri 102–65.

On April 2, 2021, Kansas signed Self to a lifetime contract. The contract will automatically add an extra year to every year he coaches until his retirement or death.

On October 14, 2021, when the Big 12 Preseason Media Poll was published, Kansas was projected to finish first in conference standings, which is the 19th time in 26 seasons of the Big 12's existence that the Jayhawks have been selected as the preseason favorite. They received 8 first-place votes and 80 total points.

The Associated Press (AP) released their preseason poll on October 18, 2021. The Jayhawks were ranked 3rd in the preseason poll. It was the 10th consecutive, 16th under Bill Self, and 24th time since the 1992–93 season KU was ranked 7th or higher in the preseason AP poll. It was also the 16th consecutive season KU was ranked in the preseason poll. It also marked KU being ranked in the preseason poll 31 of the previous 32 seasons.

After losing to Baylor on February 26 and TCU on March 1, the Jayhawks lost back-to-back games, which is only the 12th losing streak of any length under Self.

The Jayhawks defeated Texas on March 5 to clinch their 63rd regular season conference title, extending their NCAA record. It was also their 20th Big 12 title. It was also the 16th Big 12 title in the previous 18 seasons. The Jayhawks would also win the 2022 Big 12 tournament to earn their 50th NCAA Tournament appearance and their NCAA record extending 32nd consecutive. The tournament title was the Jayhawks 12th Big 12 Tournament title and their 16th overall.

After defeating Providence in the NCAA tournament, Kansas passed Kentucky to be the winningest program in the nation. The Jayhawks defeated North Carolina in the National Championship game 72–69 after trailing 40–25 at halftime. They trailed by as much as 16 completing the largest comeback in National Championship game history.

== Roster changes ==
=== Coaching staff changes ===
Name	New school	Replacement
Jerrance Howard	Texas	Jeremy Case

=== Entered draft ===
Below are players who declared for the NBA draft. The class given is what their class was for the 2020–21 season. Seniors from the previous season, due to receiving an extra year of eligibility from the NCAA, had to declare to intention to enter the draft. If a player goes undrafted, they are eligible to return.

Name	Position	Class	Returned
Ochai Agbaji	G	Junior	Yes
Jalen Wilson	F	RS Freshman	Yes
Marcus Garrett	G	Senior	No

=== 2021 recruiting class ===
College recruiting information
Name	Hometown	School	Height	Weight	Commit date
K. J. Adams Jr. F	Austin, TX	Westlake	6 ft 7 in (2.01 m)	220 lb (100 kg)	Jul 7, 2020
K. J. Adams Jr. F	Recruit ratings: Rivals: 247Sports: ESPN: (86)				
Zach Clemence; F	San Antonio, TX	Sunrise Christian	6 ft 10 in (2.08 m)	205 lb (93 kg)	May 11, 2020
Zach Clemence; F	Recruit ratings: Rivals: 247Sports: ESPN: (87)				
Bobby Pettiford; G	Durham, NC	South Granville	6 ft 0 in (1.83 m)	170 lb (77 kg)	Mar 30, 2021
Bobby Pettiford; G	Recruit ratings: Rivals: 247Sports: ESPN: (82)				
Kyle Cuffe Jr.* G	New York, NY	Blair Academy	6 ft 2 in (1.88 m)	173 lb (78 kg)	Dec 19, 2020
Kyle Cuffe Jr.* G	Recruit ratings: Rivals: 247Sports: ESPN: (76)				
Overall recruiting rankings: 247 Sports: 11 Rivals: 13 ESPN: 6

*Originally class of 2022, but reclassified to 2021.

=== Transfers ===
==== Incoming ====
Name	Position	Class	Old School
Cam Martin	C	Graduate Student	Missouri Southern
Joseph Yesufu	G	Sophomore	Drake
Remy Martin	G	Graduate Student	Arizona State
Jalen Coleman-Lands	G	Graduate Student	Iowa State

==== Outgoing ====
Name	Position	Class	New School
Tyon Grant-Foster	G	Senior	DePaul
Tristan Enaruna	G/F	Junior	Iowa State
Gethro Muscadin	C	Sophomore	New Mexico
Latrell Jossell	G	Sophomore	Stephen F. Austin
Bryce Thompson	G	Sophomore	Oklahoma State

==== Walk-ons ====
Name	Position
Charlie McCarthy	Guard
Dillon Wilhite	Forward

== Roster ==
Due to the cancellation of the 2020 NCAA tournament because of the COVID-19 pandemic, the NCAA granted 2021 seniors an extra year of eligibility. Mitch Lightfoot and Chris Teahan both returned for an extra year. Additionally, transfer Remy Martin took advantage of the extra year of eligibility by the NCAA.

2021–22 Kansas Jayhawks men's basketball team
Players
Coaches

Pos.	#	Name	Height	Weight	Year	Hometown
G	0	Bobby Pettiford	6 ft 1 in (1.85 m)	190 lb (86 kg)	Fr	Durham, NC
G	1	Joseph Yesufu	6 ft 0 in (1.83 m)	180 lb (82 kg)	So	Bolingbrook, IL
G	2	Christian Braun	6 ft 6 in (1.98 m)	218 lb (99 kg)	Jr	Burlington, KS
G	3	Dajuan Harris Jr.	6 ft 1 in (1.85 m)	170 lb (77 kg)	RS So	Columbia, MO
G	5	Kyle Cuffe Jr. (redshirt)	6 ft 2 in (1.88 m)	180 lb (82 kg)	Fr	New York, NY
F	10	Jalen Wilson	6 ft 8 in (2.03 m)	225 lb (102 kg)	RS So	Denton, TX
G	11	Remy Martin	6 ft 0 in (1.83 m)	175 lb (79 kg)	Sr	Burbank, CA
G	12	Chris Teahan (W)	6 ft 4 in (1.93 m)	195 lb (88 kg)	Sr	Leawood, KS
G	13	Charlie McCarthy (W)	6 ft 2 in (1.88 m)	195 lb (88 kg)	Fr	Rancho Mirage, CA
F	15	Dillon Wilhite (W)	6 ft 9 in (2.06 m)	240 lb (109 kg)	Fr	San Diego, CA
G	20	Michael Jankovich (W)	6 ft 5 in (1.96 m)	190 lb (86 kg)	Jr	Dallas, TX
F	21	Zach Clemence	6 ft 10 in (2.08 m)	225 lb (102 kg)	Fr	San Antonio, TX
F	24	K. J. Adams Jr.	6 ft 7 in (2.01 m)	225 lb (102 kg)	Fr	Austin, TX
G	30	Ochai Agbaji	6 ft 5 in (1.96 m)	215 lb (98 kg)	Sr	Kansas City, MO
C	31	Cam Martin (redshirt)	6 ft 9 in (2.06 m)	230 lb (104 kg)	Sr	Yukon, OK
C	33	David McCormack	6 ft 10 in (2.08 m)	250 lb (113 kg)	Sr	Norfolk, VA
F	44	Mitch Lightfoot	6 ft 8 in (2.03 m)	225 lb (102 kg)	Sr	Gilbert, AZ
G	55	Jalen Coleman-Lands	6 ft 4 in (1.93 m)	190 lb (86 kg)	Sr	Indianapolis, IN

Head coach

- Bill Self (Oklahoma State)

Assistant coach(es)

- Norm Roberts (Queens (NY))
- Kurtis Townsend (Western Kentucky)
- Jeremy Case (Kansas)

Legend

- (C) Team captain
- (S) Suspended
- (I) Ineligible
- (W) Walk-on
- Injured
- Current redshirt

Roster
Last update: February 5, 2022

== Schedule ==
=== COVID-19 impact ===
Unlike the previous year, Kansas allowed full capacity crowds. The Jayhawks finished their non-conference schedule without any positive tests for COVID-19. They did, however, cancel two non-conference games and postpone a third conference game due to COVID-19 issues with their opponents. The non-conference games that were canceled were replaced with new opponents. The Jayhawks had their first confirmed case of COVID-19 on February 1, 2022, when Ochai Agbaji tested positive for the virus.

=== Results ===
Date time, TV	Rank^{#}	Opponent^{#}	Result	Record	High points	High rebounds	High assists	Site (attendance) city, state
Exhibition
November 3, 2021*; 7:00 pm, ESPN+	No. 3	Emporia State	W 86–60	–	17 – Agbaji	8 – McCormack	4 – R. Martin	Allen Fieldhouse (16,200); Lawrence, KS
Regular season
November 9, 2021*; 6:00 pm, ESPN	No. 3	vs. Michigan State; Champions Classic	W 87–74	1–0	29 – Agbaji	8 – Braun	4 – Harris	Madison Square Garden (18,132); New York, NY
November 12, 2021*; 7:00 pm, ESPN+	No. 3	Tarleton State	W 88–62	2–0	25 – Agbaji	8 – Tied	6 – Harris	Allen Fieldhouse (16,300); Lawrence, KS
November 18, 2021*; 7:00 pm, ESPN+	No. 3	Stony Brook	W 88–59	3–0	25 – Agbaji	8 – McCormack	6 – Harris	Allen Fieldhouse (16,300); Lawrence, KS
November 25, 2021*; 1:30 pm, ESPN	No. 4	vs. North Texas; ESPN Events Invitational quarterfinals	W 71–59	4–0	18 – Agbaji	8 – R. Martin	4 – Tied	HP Field House (3,514); Bay Lake, FL
November 26, 2021*; 12:30 pm, ESPN2	No. 4	vs. Dayton; ESPN Events Invitational semifinals	L 73–74	4–1	21 – Agbaji	10 – Braun	5 – Braun	HP Field House (3,859); Bay Lake, FL
November 28, 2021*; 12:00 pm, ESPN	No. 4	vs. Iona; ESPN Events Invitational 3rd place game	W 96–83	5–1	20 – Braun	7 – Braun	5 – R. Martin	HP Field House (3,252); Bay Lake, FL
December 3, 2021*; 6:00 pm, FS1	No. 8	at St. John's; Big East–Big 12 Battle	W 95–75	6–1	31 – Braun	13 – McCormack	5 – R. Martin	UBS Arena (9,769); Elmont, NY
December 7, 2021*; 7:00 pm, ESPN+	No. 8	UTEP	W 78–52	7–1	23 – Agbaji	7 – Wilson	6 – Harris	T-Mobile Center (15,500); Kansas City, MO
December 11, 2021*; 2:15 pm, ESPN	No. 8	Missouri; Border War	W 102–65	8–1	21 – Agbaji	7 – McCormack	5 – R. Martin	Allen Fieldhouse (16,300); Lawrence, KS
December 18, 2021*; 7:00 pm, ESPN+	No. 7	Stephen F. Austin	W 80–72	9–1	21 – Braun	6 – Tied	4 – Tied	Allen Fieldhouse (16,300); Lawrence, KS
December 21, 2021*; 7:00 pm, ESPN2	No. 7	at Colorado	Canceled due to COVID-19 issues with Colorado.					CU Events Center; Boulder, CO
December 29, 2021*; 7:00 pm, ESPN+	No. 6	Harvard	Canceled due to COVID-19 issues with Harvard.					Allen Fieldhouse; Lawrence, KS
December 29, 2021*; 7:00 pm, ESPN+	No. 6	Nevada	W 88–61	10–1	22 – Braun	9 – Wilson	5 – Harris	Allen Fieldhouse (16,300); Lawrence, KS
January 1, 2022; 4:00 pm, ESPN+	No. 6	TCU	Postponed due to COVID-19 issues with TCU. Rescheduled for March 3.					Allen Fieldhouse; Lawrence, KS
January 1, 2022*; 4:00 pm, ESPN+	No. 6	George Mason	W 76–67	11–1	20 – Coleman–Lands	7 – Wilson	6 – Braun	Allen Fieldhouse (16,300); Lawrence, KS
January 4, 2022; 8:00 pm, ESPN2	No. 6	at Oklahoma State	W 74–63	12–1 (1–0)	17 – McCormack	15 – Tied	6 – Braun	Gallagher-Iba Arena (8,246); Stillwater, OK
January 8, 2022; 3:00 pm, ESPN2	No. 6	at No. 25 Texas Tech	L 67–75	12–2 (1–1)	24 – Agbaji	6 – Tied	3 – Tied	United Supermarkets Arena (14,320); Lubbock, TX
January 11, 2022; 7:00 pm, ESPN+	No. 9	No. 15 Iowa State	W 62–61	13–2 (2–1)	22 – Agbaji	7 – Tied	5 – Wilson	Allen Fieldhouse (16,300); Lawrence, KS
January 15, 2022; 1:00 pm, CBS	No. 9	West Virginia	W 85–59	14–2 (3–1)	23 – Wilson	15 – McCormack	5 – Tied	Allen Fieldhouse (16,300); Lawrence, KS
January 18, 2022; 6:00 p.m., ESPN	No. 7	at Oklahoma	W 67–64	15–2 (4–1)	16 – Wilson	8 – Wilson	4 – Harris	Lloyd Noble Center (9,296); Norman, OK
January 22, 2022; 3:00 pm, ESPN+	No. 7	at Kansas State; Sunflower Showdown	W 78–75	16–2 (5–1)	29 – Agbaji	15 – McCormack	5 – Braun	Bramlage Coliseum (9,737); Manhattan, KS
January 24, 2022; 8:00 pm, ESPN	No. 5	No. 13 Texas Tech	W 94–91 ^{2OT}	17–2 (6–1)	37 – Agbaji	11 – Wilson	6 – Braun	Allen Fieldhouse (16,300); Lawrence, KS
January 29, 2022*; 5:00 pm, ESPN	No. 5	No. 12 Kentucky; Big 12/SEC Challenge	L 62–80	17–3	13 – Tied	8 – Wilson	4 – Harris	Allen Fieldhouse (16,300); Lawrence, KS
February 1, 2022; 6:00 pm, ESPN	No. 10	at No. 20 Iowa State	W 70–61	18–3 (7–1)	14 – Tied	13 – McCormack	8 – Harris	Hilton Coliseum (13,587); Ames, IA
February 5, 2022; 3:00 pm, ESPN	No. 10	No. 8 Baylor	W 83–59	19–3 (8–1)	18 – Tied	10 – Braun	7 – Harris	Allen Fieldhouse (16,300); Lawrence, KS
February 7, 2022; 8:00 pm, ESPN	No. 8	at No. 20 Texas	L 76–79	19–4 (8–2)	18 – Wilson	11 – Wilson	6 – Harris	Frank Erwin Center (14,688); Austin, TX
February 12, 2022; 12:00 pm, CBS	No. 8	Oklahoma	W 71–69	20–4 (9–2)	22 – Wilson	9 – Wilson	3 – Harris	Allen Fieldhouse (16,300); Lawrence, KS
February 14, 2022; 8:00 pm, ESPN	No. 6	Oklahoma State	W 76–62	21–4 (10–2)	20 – Agbaji	12 – McCormack	5 – Harris	Allen Fieldhouse (16,300); Lawrence, KS
February 19, 2022; 7:00 pm, ESPN	No. 6	at West Virginia	W 71–58	22–4 (11–2)	23 – Agbaji	11 – Tied	4 – Harris	WVU Coliseum (14,012); Morgantown, WV
February 22, 2022; 8:00 pm, ESPN	No. 5	Kansas State; Sunflower Showdown	W 102–83	23–4 (12–2)	23 – Agbaji	7 – Tied	7 – Harris	Allen Fieldhouse (16,300); Lawrence, KS
February 26, 2022; 7:00 pm, ESPN	No. 5	at No. 10 Baylor	L 70–80	23–5 (12–3)	27 – Agbaji	13 – McCormack	7 – Harris	Paul J. Meyer Arena at the Ferrell Center (10,628); Waco, TX
March 1, 2022; 7:00 pm, ESPN+	No. 6	at TCU	L 64–74	23–6 (12–4)	13 – Tied	8 – Tied	7 – Harris	Schollmaier Arena (6,566); Fort Worth, TX
March 3, 2022; 7:00 pm, ESPN+	No. 6	TCU	W 72–68	24–6 (13–4)	22 – Agbaji	10 – Wilson	3 – Tied	Allen Fieldhouse (16,300); Lawrence, KS
March 5, 2022; 3:00 pm, ESPN	No. 6	No. 21 Texas	W 70–63 ^{OT}	25–6 (14–4)	22 – McCormack	13 – Wilson	4 – Harris	Allen Fieldhouse (16,300); Lawrence, KS
Big 12 Tournament
March 10, 2022; 2:00 pm, ESPN	(1) No. 6	vs. (9) West Virginia; Quarterfinals	W 87–63	26–6	18 – Agbaji	14 – Braun	7 – Harris	T-Mobile Center (15,845); Kansas City, MO
March 11, 2022; 6:00 pm, ESPN2	(1) No. 6	vs. (5) TCU; Semifinals	W 75–62	27–6	22 – Agbaji	6 – Braun	5 – Tied	T-Mobile Center (16,557); Kansas City, MO
March 12, 2022; 5:00 pm, ESPN	(1) No. 6	vs. (3) No. 14 Texas Tech; Championship	W 74–65	28–6	18 – McCormack	11 – McCormack	4 – R. Martin	T-Mobile Center (16,344); Kansas City, MO
NCAA Tournament
March 17, 2022*; 8:57 pm, truTV	(1 MW) No. 3	vs. (16 MW) Texas Southern; First Round	W 83–56	29–6	14 – Braun	7 – McCormack	4 – Tied	Dickies Arena (10,560); Fort Worth, TX
March 19, 2022*; 1:40 pm, CBS	(1 MW) No. 3	vs. (9 MW) Creighton; Second Round	W 79–72	30–6	20 – R. Martin	14 – Wilson	7 – R. Martin	Dickies Arena (12,976); Fort Worth, TX
March 25, 2022*; 6:29 p.m., TBS	(1 MW) No. 3	vs. (4 MW) No. 13 Providence; Sweet Sixteen	W 66–61	31–6	23 – R. Martin	11 – Wilson	3 – R. Martin	United Center (20,857); Chicago, IL
March 27, 2022*; 1:20 pm, CBS	(1 MW) No. 3	vs. (10 MW) Miami (FL); Elite Eight	W 76–50	32–6	18 – Agbaji	11 – Wilson	4 – Tied	United Center (20,241); Chicago, IL
April 2, 2022*; 5:09 pm, TBS	(1 MW) No. 3	vs. (2 S) No. 6 Villanova; Final Four	W 81–65	33–6	25 – McCormack	11 – Wilson	5 – Tied	Caesars Superdome (70,602); New Orleans, LA
April 4, 2022*; 8:20 pm, TBS	(1 MW) No. 3	vs. (8 E) North Carolina; National Championship	W 72–69	34–6	15 – Tied	12 – Braun	3 – Tied	Caesars Superdome (69,423); New Orleans, LA
*Non-conference game. ^{#}Rankings from AP Poll. (#) Tournament seedings in parentheses. All times are in Central Time.

== Rankings ==
Ranking movements Legend: ██ Increase in ranking ██ Decrease in ranking ( ) = First-place votes
	Week																			
Poll	Pre	1	2	3	4	5	6	7	8	9	10	11	12	13	14	15	16	17	18	Final
AP	3	3	4	8	8	7	7	6	6	9	7	5	10	8	6	5	6	6	3	Not released
Coaches	3	3*	3	7	7	7	7	6	6	10	7	5	10	8	6	5	7	6	3	1 (32)

*No poll released
