= Bryce Thompson =

Bryce Thompson may refer to:

- Bryce Thompson (basketball) (born 2002)
- Bryce Thompson (American football) (born 1999)
