= 2021–22 Texas Tech Red Raiders basketball team =

American college basketball season

2021–22 Texas Tech Red Raiders basketball

NCAA tournament, Sweet Sixteen
- Conference: Big 12 Conference

Ranking
- Coaches: No. 12
- AP: No. 12
- Record: 27–10 (12–6 Big 12)
- Head coach: Mark Adams (1st season)
- Assistant coaches: Barret Peery (1st season); Corey Williams (1st season); Talvin Hester (1st season)
- Home arena: United Supermarkets Arena

2021–22 Big 12 men's basketball standings
| | Conf. | | | | Overall |
| Team | W | | L | PCT | W | | L | PCT |
|---|---|---|---|---|---|---|---|---|
| No. 3 Kansas † | 14 | – | 4 | .778 | 34 | – | 6 | .850 |
| No. 4 Baylor | 14 | – | 4 | .778 | 27 | – | 7 | .794 |
| No. 12 Texas Tech | 12 | – | 6 | .667 | 27 | – | 10 | .730 |
| No. 25 Texas | 10 | – | 8 | .556 | 22 | – | 12 | .647 |
| TCU | 8 | – | 10 | .444 | 21 | – | 13 | .618 |
| Oklahoma State* | 8 | – | 10 | .444 | 15 | – | 15 | .500 |
| Iowa State | 7 | – | 11 | .389 | 22 | – | 13 | .629 |
| Oklahoma | 7 | – | 11 | .389 | 19 | – | 16 | .543 |
| Kansas State | 6 | – | 12 | .333 | 14 | – | 17 | .452 |
| West Virginia | 4 | – | 14 | .222 | 16 | – | 17 | .485 |
† 2022 Big 12 Tournament winner *Oklahoma State was ineligible for both the 2022 Big 12 Tournament and the 2022 NCAA tournament due to postseason ban imposed by the NCAA. Rankings from AP poll

The 2021–22 Texas Tech Red Raiders basketball team represented Texas Tech University in the 2021–22 NCAA Division I men's basketball season as a member of the Big 12 Conference. The Red Raiders were led by first-year coach Mark Adams. They played their home games at the United Supermarkets Arena in Lubbock, Texas. They finished the season 27–10, 12–6 in Big 12 play to finish in third place. In the Big 12 tournament, they defeated Iowa State and Oklahoma to advance to the championship game, but lost to Kansas. They received an at-large bid to the NCAA tournament as the No. 3 seed in the West region. There they defeated Montana State and Notre Dame to advance to the Sweet Sixteen. In the Sweet Sixteen, they lost to Duke.

== Previous season ==
In a season limited due to the ongoing COVID-19 pandemic, the Red Raiders finished the season 18–11, 9–8 in Big 12 play to finish in tie for sixth place. They lost in the quarterfinals to Texas of the Big 12 tournament. They received an at-large bid to the NCAA tournament where they defeated Utah State in the first round before losing Arkansas in the second round.

On April 1, 2021, head coach Chris Beard left the school after five seasons to accept the head coaching job at Texas. The Red Raiders named top assistant Mark Adams as head coach on April 5.

== Offseason ==
=== Departures ===
| Name | Number | Pos. | Height | Weight | Year | Hometown | Reason for departure |
|---|---|---|---|---|---|---|---|
| Mac McClung | 0 | G | 6'2" | 185 | Junior | Gate City, VA | Declared for 2021 NBA draft |
| Jamarius Burton | 2 | G | 6'4" | 205 | Junior | Charlotte, NC | Transferred to Pittsburgh |
| Micah Peavy | 5 | G | 6'7" | 215 | Freshman | Cibolo, TX | Transferred to TCU |
| Tyreek Smith | 10 | F | 6'7" | 220 | RS Freshman | Baton Rouge, LA | Transferred to Oklahoma State |
| Kyler Edwards | 11 | G | 6'4" | 195 | Junior | Arlington, TX | Transferred to Houston |
| Marcus Santos-Silva | 14 | F | 6'7" | 250 | Graduate Transfer | Taunton, MA | Graduated; transferred to NFL team Cleveland Browns |
| Avery Benson | 21 | G | 6'4" | 195 | RS Junior | Springdale, AR | Walk-on; transferred to Texas |
| Vladislav Goldin | 50 | F | 7'1" | 240 | Freshman | Nalchik, Russia | Transferred to Florida Atlantic |

=== Incoming transfers ===
| Name | Number | Pos. | Height | Weight | Year | Hometown | Previous school |
|---|---|---|---|---|---|---|---|
| Kevin Obanor | 0 | F | 6'8" | 235 | RS Senior | Houston, TX | Oral Roberts |
| Davion Warren | 2 | G | 6'6" | 205 | Graduate Student | Buffalo, NY | Hampton |
| Daniel Batcho | 4 | F | 6'11" | 235 | RS Freshman | Paris, France | Arizona |
| Sardaar Calhoun | 5 | G | 6'6" | 210 | Senior | Tappahannock, VA | Florida State |
| Bryson Williams | 11 | F | 6'8" | 240 | Graduate Student | Fresno, CA | UTEP |
| Mylik Wilson | 13 | G | 6'3" | 175 | Junior | Rayville, LA | Louisiana |
| KJ Allen | 21 | F | 6'6" | 255 | Sophomore | Los Angeles, CA | East Los Angeles College |
| Adonis Arms | 25 | G | 6'5" | 200 | Graduate Student | Milwaukee, WI | Winthrop |

=== Recruiting classes ===
==== 2021 recruiting class ====
There were no incoming recruits for the class of 2021.

==== 2022 recruiting class ====
College recruiting (2022)
| Name | Hometown | School | Height | Weight | Commit date |
|---|---|---|---|---|---|
| Rickie Isaacs #15 PG | Las Vegas, NV | Coronado High School | 6 ft 2 in (1.88 m) | 175 lb (79 kg) | Sep 9, 2021 |
| Rickie Isaacs #15 PG | Recruit ratings: Scout: Rivals: 247Sports: ESPN: (82) | | | | |
| Robert Jennings #37 PF | DeSoto, TX | Texas Association of Christian Athletes | 6 ft 7 in (2.01 m) | 200 lb (91 kg) | Sep 30, 2021 |
| Robert Jennings #37 PF | Recruit ratings: Scout: Rivals: 247Sports: ESPN: (80) | | | | |
Overall recruit ranking:
Note: In many cases, Scout, Rivals, 247Sports, On3, and ESPN may conflict in their listings of height and weight.; In these cases, the average was taken. ESPN grades are on a 100-point scale.; Sources: "2022 Team Ranking". Rivals.

== Roster ==
2021–22 Texas Tech Red Raiders men's basketball team
Players
Coaches

| Pos. | # | Name | Height | Weight | Year | Previous school | Hometown |
|---|---|---|---|---|---|---|---|
| F | 0 | Kevin Obanor | 6 ft 8 in (2.03 m) | 235 lb (107 kg) | RS Sr | Oral Roberts | Houston, TX |
| G | 1 | Terrence Shannon Jr. | 6 ft 6 in (1.98 m) | 215 lb (98 kg) | Jr | IMG Academy | Chicago, IL |
| G | 2 | Davion Warren | 6 ft 6 in (1.98 m) | 205 lb (93 kg) | GS | Hampton | Buffalo, NY |
| G | 3 | Clarence Nadolny | 6 ft 3 in (1.91 m) | 200 lb (91 kg) | Jr | Scotland Performance Institute | Montreuil, France |
| F | 4 | Daniel Batcho | 6 ft 11 in (2.11 m) | 235 lb (107 kg) | RS Fr | Arizona | Paris, France |
| G | 5 | Sardaar Calhoun | 6 ft 6 in (1.98 m) | 210 lb (95 kg) | Sr | Florida State | Tappahannock, VA |
| G | 10 | Ethan Duncan (W) | 6 ft 0 in (1.83 m) | 170 lb (77 kg) | Fr | Trinity Christian | Lubbock, TX |
| F | 11 | Bryson Williams | 6 ft 8 in (2.03 m) | 240 lb (109 kg) | GS | UTEP | Fresno, CA |
| G | 13 | Mylik Wilson | 6 ft 3 in (1.91 m) | 175 lb (79 kg) | Jr | Louisiana | Rayville, LA |
| F | 14 | Marcus Santos-Silva | 6 ft 8 in (2.03 m) | 235 lb (107 kg) | RS Sr | VCU | Taunton, MA |
| G | 15 | Kevin McCullar Jr. | 6 ft 6 in (1.98 m) | 210 lb (95 kg) | RS Jr | Karen Wagner | San Antonio, TX |
| F | 21 | KJ Allen | 6 ft 6 in (1.98 m) | 255 lb (116 kg) | So | East Los Angeles College | Los Angeles, CA |
| G | 23 | Chibuzo Agbo | 6 ft 7 in (2.01 m) | 220 lb (100 kg) | So | St. Augustine | San Diego, CA |
| G | 25 | Adonis Arms | 6 ft 5 in (1.96 m) | 200 lb (91 kg) | GS | Winthrop | Milwaukee, WI |

Head coach

- Mark Adams (Texas Tech)

Assistant coach(es)

- Barret Peery (Southern Utah)
- Corey Williams (Oklahoma State)
- Talvin Hester (Texas Wesleyan)

Legend

- (C) Team captain
- (S) Suspended
- (I) Ineligible
- (W) Walk-on
- Injured
- Current redshirt

Roster

== Schedule and results ==
| Date time, TV | Rank^{#} | Opponent^{#} | Result | Record | High points | High rebounds | High assists | Site (attendance) city, state |
Regular season
| November 9, 2021*; 7:00 p.m., ESPN+ | | North Florida | W 89–74 | 1–0 | 22 – Williams | 7 – Williams | 7 – Wilson | United Supermarkets Arena (14,245); Lubbock, TX |
| November 12, 2021*; 7:00 p.m., ESPN+ | | Grambling State | W 88–62 | 2–0 | 24 – McCullar Jr. | 9 – Tied | 3 – Tied | United Supermarkets Arena (14,171); Lubbock, TX |
| November 15, 2021*; 7:00 p.m., ESPN+ | | Prairie View A&M | W 84–49 | 3–0 | 18 – Williams | 7 – Tied | 5 – Tied | United Supermarkets Arena (12,419); Lubbock, TX |
| November 20, 2021*; 4:00 p.m., ESPN+ | | vs. Incarnate Word; South Padre Island Battle on the Beach | W 84–62 | 4–0 | 17 – McCullar Jr. | 8 – Batcho | 6 – Shannon Jr. | South Padre Island Convention Centre (1,340); South Padre Island, TX |
| November 23, 2021*; 7:00 p.m., ESPN+ | | Omaha | W 96–40 | 5–0 | 18 – Shannon Jr. | 10 – Batcho | 6 – Batcho | United Supermarkets Arena (12,670); Lubbock, TX |
| November 27, 2021*; 3:00 p.m., ESPN+ | | Lamar | W 89–57 | 6–0 | 20 – Obanor | 12 – Santos-Silva | 4 – Wilson | United Supermarkets Arena (12,233); Lubbock, TX |
| December 1, 2021*; 7:30 p.m., FS1 | | at Providence; Big East–Big 12 Battle | L 68–72 | 6–1 | 17 – Shannon Jr. | 7 – Arms | 1 – Tied | Dunkin' Donuts Center (10,022); Providence, RI |
| December 7, 2021*; 6:00 p.m., ESPN | | vs. No. 13 Tennessee; Jimmy V Classic | W 57–52 ^{OT} | 7–1 | 18 – Shannon Jr. | 12 – Shannon Jr. | 5 – McCullar Jr. | Madison Square Garden; New York, NY |
| December 14, 2021*; 7:00 p.m., ESPN+ | No. 25 | Arkansas State | W 75–62 | 8–1 | 21 – McCullar Jr. | 5 – Tied | 4 – McCullar Jr. | United Supermarkets Arena (12,431); Lubbock, TX |
| December 18, 2021*; 12:00 p.m., CBS | No. 25 | vs. No. 5 Gonzaga; Jerry Colangelo Classic | L 55–69 | 8–2 | 14 – McCullar Jr. | 10 – McCullar Jr. | 3 – Warren | Footprint Center (7,831); Phoenix, AZ |
| December 22, 2021*; 1:00 p.m., ESPN+ | No. 25 | Eastern Washington | W 78–46 | 9–2 | 12 – Tied | 7 – Obanor | 5 – McCullar Jr. | United Supermarkets Arena (12,133); Lubbock, TX |
| December 28, 2021*; 1:00 p.m., ESPN+ | No. 25 | Alabama State | W 75–53 | 10–2 | 15 – Warren | 9 – Batcho | 7 – McCullar Jr. | United Supermarkets Arena (12,059); Lubbock, TX |
| January 5, 2022; 3:00 p.m., ESPNU | No. 25 | at No. 11 Iowa State | L 47–51 | 10–3 (0–1) | 12 – Warren | 10 – Obanor | 3 – Tied | Hilton Coliseum (11,699); Ames, IA |
| January 8, 2022; 3:00 p.m., ESPN2 | No. 25 | No. 6 Kansas | W 75–67 | 11–3 (1–1) | 22 – Williams | 8 – Williams | 5 – Wilson | United Supermarkets Arena (14,320); Lubbock, TX |
| January 11, 2022; 6:00 p.m., ESPN2 | No. 19 | at No. 1 Baylor | W 65–62 | 12–3 (2–1) | 14 – Arms | 9 – Arms | 5 – Arms | Ferrell Center (8,569); Waco, TX |
| January 13, 2022; 6:00 p.m., ESPN+ | No. 19 | Oklahoma State rescheduled from Jan. 1 | W 78–57 | 13–3 (3–1) | 17 – Obanor | 10 – Santos-Silva | 4 – McCullar Jr. | United Supermarkets Arena (14,853); Lubbock, TX |
| January 15, 2022; 11:00 a.m., ESPNU | No. 19 | at Kansas State | L 51–62 | 13–4 (3–2) | 20 – Williams | 7 – Arms | 3 – McCullar Jr. | Bramlage Coliseum (5,971); Manhattan, KS |
| January 18, 2022; 8:00 p.m., ESPNU | No. 18 | No. 15 Iowa State | W 72–60 | 14–4 (4–2) | 16 – Williams | 8 – Obanor | 3 – McCullar Jr. | United Supermarkets Arena (15,098); Lubbock, TX |
| January 22, 2022; 11:00 a.m., ESPN2 | No. 18 | West Virginia | W 78–65 | 15–4 (5–2) | 23 – Shannon Jr. | 6 – Tied | 4 – McCullar Jr. | United Supermarkets Arena (14,556); Lubbock, TX |
| January 24, 2022; 8:00 p.m., ESPN | No. 13 | at No. 5 Kansas | L 91–94 ^{2OT} | 15–5 (5–3) | 33 – Williams | 8 – Obanor | 5 – Warren | Allen Fieldhouse (16,300); Lawrence, KS |
| January 29, 2022*; 5:00 p.m., ESPN2 | No. 13 | Mississippi State; Big 12/SEC Challenge | W 76–50 | 16–5 | 16 – Arms | 9 – Santos-Silva | 7 – Arms | United Supermarkets Arena (15,098); Lubbock, TX |
| February 1, 2022; 8:00 p.m., ESPN2 | No. 14 | No. 23 Texas | W 77–64 | 17–5 (6–3) | 19 – McCullar Jr. | 9 – Arms | 4 – Arms | United Supermarkets Arena (15,300); Lubbock, TX |
| February 5, 2022; 1:00 p.m., ESPN | No. 14 | at West Virginia | W 60–53 | 18–5 (7–3) | 15 – Williams | 9 – McCullar Jr. | 3 – Wilson | WVU Coliseum (12,673); Morgantown, WV |
| February 9, 2022; 8:00 p.m., ESPNU | No. 9 | at Oklahoma | L 55–70 | 18–6 (7–4) | 12 – McCullar Jr. | 4 – Wilson | 3 – Warren | Lloyd Noble Center (7,298); Norman, OK |
| February 12, 2022; 3:00 p.m., ESPN+ | No. 9 | TCU | W 82–69 | 19–6 (8–4) | 20 – Shannon Jr. | 5 – Arms | 4 – Arms | United Supermarkets Arena (14,810); Lubbock, TX |
| February 16, 2022; 8:00 p.m., ESPN2 | No. 11 | No. 7 Baylor | W 83–73 | 20–6 (9–4) | 23 – Obanor | 13 – Obanor | 5 – Shannon Jr. | United Supermarkets Arena (14,923); Lubbock, TX |
| February 19, 2022; 11:30 a.m., ABC | No. 11 | at No. 20 Texas | W 61–55 | 21–6 (10–4) | 17 – Williams | 8 – Santos-Silva | 3 – Shannon Jr. | Frank Erwin Center (16,540); Austin, TX |
| February 22, 2022; 7:00 p.m., ESPN+ | No. 9 | Oklahoma | W 66–42 | 22–6 (11–4) | 16 – Warren | 6 – Santos-Silva | 5 – Arms | United Supermarkets Arena (15,098); Lubbock, TX |
| February 26, 2022; 5:00 p.m., ESPN2 | No. 9 | at TCU | L 66–69 | 22–7 (11–5) | 21 – Williams | 5 – Arms | 4 – Arms | Schollmaier Arena (7,026); Fort Worth, TX |
| February 28, 2022; 8:00 p.m., ESPN2 | No. 12 | Kansas State | W 73–68 | 23–7 (12–5) | 23 – Warren | 8 – Allen | 6 – Arms | United Supermarkets Arena (15,098); Lubbock, TX |
| March 5, 2022; 2:00 p.m., ESPN+ | No. 12 | at Oklahoma State | L 51–52 | 23–8 (12–6) | 16 – Obanor | 10 – Obanor | 4 – Shannon Jr. | Gallagher-Iba Arena (10,184); Stillwater, OK |
Big 12 Tournament
| March 10, 2022; 8:30 p.m., ESPN2 | (3) No. 14 | vs. (6) Iowa State; Quarterfinals | W 72–41 | 24–8 | 15 – Shannon Jr. | 6 – Obanor | 3 – Tied | T-Mobile Center (15,805); Kansas City, MO |
| March 11, 2022; 8:30 p.m., ESPN2 | (3) No. 14 | vs. (7) Oklahoma; Semifinals | W 56–55 | 25–8 | 11 – Tied | 6 – Santos-Silva | 5 – Arms | T-Mobile Center (16,557); Kansas City, MO |
| March 12, 2022; 5:00 p.m., ESPN | (3) No. 14 | vs. (1) No. 6 Kansas; Championship | L 65–74 | 25–9 | 17 – Williams | 8 – Arms | 5 – McCullar Jr. | T-Mobile Center (16,344); Kansas City, MO |
NCAA tournament
| March 18, 2022*; 12:45 p.m., TNT | (3 W) No. 12 | vs. (14 W) Montana State; First Round | W 97–62 | 26–9 | 20 – Tied | 11 – Obanor | 6 – Shannon Jr. | Viejas Arena; San Diego, CA |
| March 20, 2022*; 6:10 p.m., TBS | (3 W) No. 12 | vs. (11 W) Notre Dame; Second Round | W 59–53 | 27–9 | 15 – Obanor | 15 – Obanor | 4 – Arms | Viejas Arena; San Diego, CA |
| March 24, 2022*; 8:40 p.m., CBS | (3 W) No. 12 | vs. (2 W) No. 9 Duke; Sweet Sixteen | L 73–78 | 27–10 | 21 – Williams | 10 – Obanor | 7 – Arms | Chase Center (17,514); San Francisco, CA |
*Non-conference game. ^{#}Rankings from AP Poll. (#) Tournament seedings in parentheses. W=West. All times are in Central Time.

== Rankings ==
Ranking movements Legend: ██ Increase in ranking ██ Decrease in ranking RV = Received votes
| | Week | | | | | | | | | | | | | | | | | | | |
| Poll | Pre | 1 | 2 | 3 | 4 | 5 | 6 | 7 | 8 | 9 | 10 | 11 | 12 | 13 | 14 | 15 | 16 | 17 | 18 | Final |
|---|---|---|---|---|---|---|---|---|---|---|---|---|---|---|---|---|---|---|---|---|
| AP | RV | RV | RV | RV | RV | 25 | 25 | 25 | 25 | 19 | 18 | 13 | 14 | 9 | 11 | 9 | 12 | 14 | 12 | Not released |
| Coaches | RV | RV* | RV | RV | RV | 24 | 25 | 25 | 25 | 19 | 19 | 14 | 14 | 9 | 11 | 9 | 12 | 14 | 11 | 12 |

*AP does not release post-NCAA tournament rankings. No Coaches Poll for Week 1.
