= 2021–22 Iowa State Cyclones men's basketball team =

American college basketball season

2021–22 Iowa State Cyclones men's basketball

NIT Season Tip-Off champions

NCAA tournament, Sweet Sixteen
- Conference: Big 12 Conference

Ranking
- Coaches: No. 23
- Record: 22–13 (7–11 Big 12)
- Head coach: T. J. Otzelberger (1st season)
- Assistant coaches: Kyle Green; Daniyal Robinson; J.R. Blount
- Home arena: Hilton Coliseum

2021–22 Big 12 men's basketball standings
	Conf.				Overall
Team	W		L	PCT	W		L	PCT
No. 3 Kansas †	14	–	4	.778	34	–	6	.850
No. 4 Baylor	14	–	4	.778	27	–	7	.794
No. 12 Texas Tech	12	–	6	.667	27	–	10	.730
No. 25 Texas	10	–	8	.556	22	–	12	.647
TCU	8	–	10	.444	21	–	13	.618
Oklahoma State*	8	–	10	.444	15	–	15	.500
Iowa State	7	–	11	.389	22	–	13	.629
Oklahoma	7	–	11	.389	19	–	16	.543
Kansas State	6	–	12	.333	14	–	17	.452
West Virginia	4	–	14	.222	16	–	17	.485
† 2022 Big 12 Tournament winner *Oklahoma State was ineligible for both the 2022 Big 12 Tournament and the 2022 NCAA tournament due to postseason ban imposed by the NCAA. Rankings from AP poll

The 2021–22 Iowa State Cyclones men's basketball team represented Iowa State University during the 2021–22 NCAA Division I men's basketball season. The Cyclones were coached by T. J. Otzelberger, who was in his first season as head coach, and ninth season at Iowa State. They played their home games at Hilton Coliseum in Ames, Iowa as members of the Big 12 Conference.

The Cyclones started the season 12–0, for one of the best starts in school history, including being crowned the champion of the NIT Season Tip-Off with wins over 25th-ranked Xavier and 9th-ranked Memphis. In Otzelberger's first season, he claimed the best start to an Iowa State coaching career by winning his first 10 games, ultimately winning his first 12 games before losing at home to #1 Baylor to end his unbeaten start at Iowa State.

== Previous season ==
In a season limited due to the ongoing COVID-19 pandemic, the Cyclones finished the 2020–21 season 2–22, 0–18 in Big 12 play to finish in last place. They lost to Oklahoma in the first round of the Big 12 Conference tournament.

Following the winless conference season, the school fired head coach Steve Prohm after six years in Ames. On March 18, 2021, it was announced that the school had hired UNLV head coach and former Iowa State assistant Otzelberger as the team's new head coach.

== Offseason ==
=== Departures ===
Offseason departures
Name	Position	Reason for departure
Dudley Blackwell	Forward	Entered transfer portal
Rasir Bolton	Guard	Transferred to Gonzaga
Jalen Coleman-Lands	Guard	Transferred to Kansas
Darlinstone Dubar	Guard	Transferred to Hofstra
Tyler Harris	Guard	Transferred to Memphis
Nate Jenkins	Guard	Transferred to Green Bay
Nate Schuster	Guard	Graduated
Xavier Foster	Center	Dismissed
Solomon Young	Forward	Graduated
Javan Johnson	Forward	Transferred to DePaul
Blake Hinson	Forward	Quit team

=== Incoming transfers ===
Incoming transfers
Name	Position	Hometown	Previous school	Remaining eligibility	Notes
Izaiah Brockington	Guard	Philadelphia	Penn State	2	Brockington was previously at St. Bonaventure for one season before transferring to Penn State.
Tristan Enaruna	Guard	Almere, Netherlands	Kansas	3	
Caleb Grill	Guard	Wichita, Kansas	UNLV	3	Grill returned to Iowa State after transferring.
Robert Jones	Forward	Prior Lake, Minnesota	Denver	3	
Gabe Kalscheur	Guard	Edina, Minnesota	Minnesota	2	
Aljaž Kunc	Forward	Ljubljana, Slovenia	Washington State	2	
Tre King	Forward	Lexington, Kentucky	Georgetown	2	King was previously at Eastern Kentucky before transferring to Georgetown. He never played for Georgetown.

=== 2021 recruiting class ===
College recruiting
Name	Hometown	School	Height	Weight	Commit date
Tyrese Hunter; PG	Racine, Wisconsin	St. Catherine's HS (WI)	6 ft 1 in (1.85 m)	175 lb (79 kg)	Aug 4, 2020
Tyrese Hunter; PG	Recruit ratings: Rivals: 247Sports: ESPN: (87)				
Overall recruit ranking: Rivals: 60 247Sports: 78
Note: In many cases, Scout, Rivals, 247Sports, On3, and ESPN may conflict in their listings of height and weight.; In these cases, the average was taken. ESPN grades are on a 100-point scale.; Sources: "Iowa State 2021 Basketball Commitments". Rivals.; "2021 Iowa State Cyclones Recruiting Class". ESPN.; "2021 Team Ranking". Rivals.

== Roster ==
2021–22 Iowa State Cyclones men's basketball team
Players
Coaches

Pos.	#	Name	Height	Weight	Year	Previous school	Hometown
F	0	Tre King	6 ft 7 in (2.01 m)	235 lb (107 kg)	Sr	Georgetown	Lexington, Kentucky
G	1	Izaiah Brockington	6 ft 4 in (1.93 m)	196 lb (89 kg)	Sr	Penn State	Philadelphia
G	2	Caleb Grill	6 ft 3 in (1.91 m)	198 lb (90 kg)	Jr	UNLV	Wichita, Kansas
G	3	Tre Jackson	6 ft 0 in (1.83 m)	185 lb (84 kg)	Jr	Blythewood HS	Columbia, South Carolina
F	4	George Conditt IV	6 ft 9 in (2.06 m)	234 lb (106 kg)	Sr	Corliss HS	Chicago
F	5	Aljaž Kunc	6 ft 8 in (2.03 m)	215 lb (98 kg)	Sr	Washington State	Ljubljana, Slovenia
G	11	Tyrese Hunter	6 ft 0 in (1.83 m)	178 lb (81 kg)	Fr	St. Catherine's	Racine, Wisconsin
F	12	Robert Jones	6 ft 9 in (2.06 m)	245 lb (111 kg)	Jr	Denver	Prior Lake, Minnesota
G	15	Carter Boothe (W)	6 ft 0 in (1.83 m)	200 lb (91 kg)	Sr	Central Decatur Community School District	Leon, Iowa
G	21	Jaden Walker	6 ft 5 in (1.96 m)	200 lb (91 kg)	So	Discovery High School	Lawrenceville, GA
G	22	Gabe Kalscheur	6 ft 4 in (1.93 m)	198 lb (90 kg)	Sr	Minnesota	Edina, Minnesota
G/F	23	Tristan Enaruna	6 ft 8 in (2.03 m)	220 lb (100 kg)	Jr	Kansas	Almere, Netherlands
G	25	Eric Steyer (W)	6 ft 5 in (1.96 m)	180 lb (82 kg)	RS Sr	Ames HS	Ames, Iowa

Head coach

- T. J. Otzelberger (UW–Whitewater)

Assistant coach(es)

- Kyle Green (Hamline)
- Daniyal Robinson (Little Rock)
- J.R. Blount (Loyola Chicago)

Legend

- (C) Team captain
- (S) Suspended
- (I) Ineligible
- (W) Walk-on
- Injured
- Current redshirt

Roster
Last update: October 8, 2021

== Schedule and results ==
This was the second season that Big 12 Now on ESPN+ aired a number of Big 12 games. On May 20, 2021, Iowa State announced it would play in the 2021 NIT Season Tip-Off on November 24 and November 26. The tournament also featured Memphis, Virginia Tech, and Xavier. On June 2, the Big 12 announced matchups as part of the Big East-Big 12 Battle, with Iowa State traveling to Omaha, Nebraska to play Creighton and former Iowa State head coach Greg McDermott. The game was played on December 4. Iowa then traveled to Ames as part of the Iowa Corn Cy-Hawk Series on December 9. On June 23, it was announced that the Cyclones would face Missouri in the Big 12/SEC Challenge. On June 30, Iowa State announced its nonconference schedule.

Date time, TV	Rank^{#}	Opponent^{#}	Result	Record	High points	High rebounds	High assists	Site (attendance) city, state
Regular season
Nov 9, 2021*; 7:00 p.m., ESPN+		Kennesaw State	W 84–73	1–0	19 – Kalscheur	6 – Tied	5 – Hunter	Hilton Coliseum (12,180); Ames, Iowa
Nov 12, 2021*; 7:00 p.m., ESPN+		Oregon State	W 60–50	2–0	15 – Kalscheur	12 – Brockington	7 – Hunter	Hilton Coliseum (12,401); Ames, Iowa
Nov 16, 2021*; 7:00 p.m., ESPN+		Alabama State	W 68–60	3–0	23 – Brockington	13 – Brockington	6 – Hunter	Hilton Coliseum (12,100); Ames, Iowa
Nov 21, 2021*; 5:00 p.m., ESPN+		Grambling State	W 82–47	4–0	21 – Kunc	10 – Conditt	6 – Hunter	Hilton Coliseum (10,533); Ames, Iowa
Nov 24, 2021*; 6:00 p.m., ESPNU		vs. No. 25 Xavier; NIT Season Tip-Off Semifinals	W 82–70	5–0	30 – Brockington	6 – Brockington	3 – Brockington	Barclays Center (2,804); Brooklyn, New York
Nov 26, 2021*; 8:30 p.m., ESPN2		vs. No. 9 Memphis; NIT Season Tip-Off Championship	W 78–59	6–0	30 – Kalscheur	8 – Kalscheur	5 – Hunter	Barclays Center (2,655); Brooklyn, New York
Dec 1, 2021*; 7:00 p.m., ESPN+	No. 19	Arkansas–Pine Bluff	W 83–64	7–0	23 – Brockington	10 – Brockington	6 – Hunter	Hilton Coliseum (12,305); Ames, Iowa
Dec 4, 2021*; 8:00 p.m., FS1	No. 19	at Creighton; Big East–Big 12 Battle	W 64–58	8–0	16 – Grill	7 – Tied	6 – Hunter	CHI Health Center Omaha (18,294); Omaha, Nebraska
Dec 9, 2021*; 8:00 p.m., ESPN2	No. 17	Iowa; Iowa Corn Cy-Hawk Series	W 73–53	9–0	29 – Brockington	10 – Brockington	6 – Hunter	Hilton Coliseum (14,267); Ames, Iowa
Dec 12, 2021*; 12:00 p.m., ESPN+	No. 17	Jackson State	W 47–37	10–0	12 – Kunc	7 – Brockington	3 – Hunter	Hilton Coliseum (12,537); Ames, Iowa
Dec 19, 2021*; 12:00 p.m., ESPN+	No. 11	Southeastern Louisiana	W 77–54	11–0	20 – Grill	11 – Brockington	6 – Hunter	Hilton Coliseum (11,809); Ames, Iowa
Dec 21, 2021*; 6:00 p.m., ESPN+	No. 9	Chicago State	W 79–48	12–0	20 – Brockington	13 – Brockington	8 – Kalscheur	Hilton Coliseum (11,894); Ames, Iowa
Jan 1, 2022; 1:00 p.m., ESPNU	No. 8	No. 1 Baylor	L 72–77	12–1 (0–1)	23 – Enaruna	8 – Tied	4 – Hunter	Hilton Coliseum (14,267); Ames, Iowa
Jan 5, 2022; 8:00 p.m., ESPNU	No. 11	No. 25 Texas Tech	W 51–47	13–1 (1–1)	14 – Brockington	9 – Brockington	3 – Tied	Hilton Coliseum (11,699); Ames, Iowa
Jan 8, 2022; 5:00 p.m., ESPNU	No. 11	at Oklahoma	L 66–79	13–2 (1–2)	20 – Tied	4 – Brockington	5 – Conditt	Lloyd Noble Center (8,142); Norman, Oklahoma
Jan 11, 2022; 7:00 p.m., ESPN+	No. 15	at No. 9 Kansas	L 61–62	13–3 (1–3)	17 – Brockington	8 – Brockington	5 – Hunter	Allen Fieldhouse (16,300); Lawrence, Kansas
Jan 15, 2022; 1:00 p.m., ESPN+	No. 15	No. 21 Texas	W 79–70	14–3 (2–3)	22 – Kalscheur	5 – Tied	8 – Hunter	Hilton Coliseum (14,267); Ames, Iowa
Jan 18, 2022; 8:00 p.m., ESPNU	No. 15	at No. 18 Texas Tech	L 60–72	14–4 (2–4)	17 – Grill	9 – Brockington	2 – Tied	United Supermarkets Arena (15,098); Lubbock, Texas
Jan 22, 2022; 3:00 p.m., ESPN2	No. 15	TCU	L 44–59	14–5 (2–5)	19 – Brockington	12 – Brockington	4 – Hunter	Hilton Coliseum (14,267); Ames, Iowa
Jan 26, 2022; 7:00 p.m., ESPN+	No. 23	at Oklahoma State	W 84–81 ^{OT}	15–5 (3–5)	26 – Brockington	8 – Conditt	5 – Tied	Gallagher-Iba Arena (8,271); Stillwater, Oklahoma
Jan 29, 2022*; 1:00 p.m., ESPNU	No. 23	Missouri; Big 12/SEC Challenge	W 67–50	16–5	15 – Brockington	6 – Brockington	4 – Hunter	Hilton Coliseum (13,612); Ames, Iowa
Feb 1, 2022; 6:00 p.m, ESPN	No. 20	No. 10 Kansas	L 61–70	16–6 (3–6)	24 – Brockington	8 – Brockington	5 – Grill	Hilton Coliseum (13,587); Ames, Iowa
Feb 5, 2022; 1:00 p.m., LHN	No. 20	at No. 23 Texas	L 41–63	16–7 (3–7)	14 – Tied	8 – Allen	8 – Carr	Frank Erwin Center (13,656); Austin, Texas
Feb 8, 2022; 6:00 p.m., ESPN+		at West Virginia	L 63–79	16–8 (3–8)	22 – Hunter	6 – Brockington	4 – Hunter	WVU Coliseum (11,191); Morgantown, West Virginia
Feb 12, 2022; 3:00 p.m., ESPNU		Kansas State	L 69–75 ^{OT}	16–9 (3–9)	27 – Brockington	8 – Grill	7 – Conditt	Hilton Coliseum (13,477); Ames, Iowa
Feb 15, 2022; 8:00 p.m., ESPNU		at TCU	W 54–51	17–9 (4–9)	20 – Brockington	7 – Brockington	4 – Conditt	Schollmaier Arena (5,567); Fort Worth, Texas
Feb 19, 2022; 1:00 p.m., ESPN+		Oklahoma	W 75–54	18–9 (5–9)	22 – Brockington	5 – Kunc	7 – Hunter	Hilton Coliseum (13,746); Ames, Iowa
Feb 23, 2022; 6:00 p.m., ESPNU		West Virginia	W 84–81	19–9 (6–9)	35 – Brockington	5 – Brockington	9 – Hunter	Hilton Coliseum (12,810); Ames, Iowa
Feb 26, 2022; 1:00 p.m., ESPNU		at Kansas State	W 74–73	20–9 (7–9)	18 – Grill	8 – Brockington	10 – Hunter	Bramlage Coliseum (8,090); Manhattan, Kansas
Mar 2, 2022; 6:00 p.m., ESPN+		Oklahoma State	L 36–53	20–10 (7–10)	13 – Brockington	7 – Kunc	3 – Hunter	Hilton Coliseum (12,699); Ames, Iowa
Mar 5, 2022; 5:00 p.m., ESPN2		at No. 3 Baylor	L 68–75	20–11 (7–11)	18 – Kalscheur	6 – Tied	13 – Hunter	Ferrell Center (9,385); Waco, Texas
Big 12 Tournament
Mar 10, 2022; 8:30 p.m., ESPN2	(6)	vs. (3) No. 14 Texas Tech; Quarterfinals	L 41–72	20–12	9 – Hunter	6 – Kunc	3 – Jones	T-Mobile Center (15,805); Kansas City, Missouri
NCAA tournament
Mar 18, 2022; 6:20 p.m., TBS	(11 MW)	vs. (6 MW) LSU; First Round	W 59–54	21–12	23 – Hunter	4 – Tied	3 – Tied	Fiserv Forum (17,500); Milwaukee
Mar 20, 2022; 5:10 p.m., TNT	(11 MW)	vs. (3 MW) No. 14 Wisconsin; Second Round	W 54–49	22–12	22 – Kalscheur	6 – Tied	5 – Hunter	Fiserv Forum (17,500); Milwaukee
Mar 27, 2022; 8:55 p.m., TBS	(11 MW)	vs. (10 MW) Miami (FL); Sweet Sixteen	L 56–70	22–13	13 – Tied	9 – Kunc	7 – Hunter	United Center (20,857); Chicago
*Non-conference game. ^{#}Rankings from AP poll. (#) Tournament seedings in parentheses. All times are in Central Time.

== Rankings ==
Ranking movements Legend: ██ Increase in ranking ██ Decrease in ranking — = Not ranked RV = Received votes
	Week																				
Poll	Pre	1	2	3	4	5	6	7	8	9	10	11	12	13	14	15	16	17	18	19	Final
AP	—	—	—	—	19	17	11	9	8	11	15	15	23	20	RV	—	—	RV	—	—	Not released
Coaches	—	—	—	—	23	19	11	8	8	11	16	14	24	22	RV	RV	—	RV	RV	RV	23

*AP does not release post-NCAA Tournament rankings.
^Coaches do not release a Week 1 poll.
