= 2021–22 Oklahoma Sooners men's basketball team =

American college basketball season

2021–22 Oklahoma Sooners men's basketball

NIT, Second Round
- Conference: Big 12 Conference
- Record: 19–16 (7–11 Big 12)
- Head coach: Porter Moser (1st season)
- Associate head coach: David Patrick (1st season)
- Assistant coaches: K. T. Turner (1st season); Emanuel Dildy (1st season)
- Home arena: Lloyd Noble Center

2021–22 Big 12 men's basketball standings
	Conf.				Overall
Team	W		L	PCT	W		L	PCT
No. 3 Kansas †	14	–	4	.778	34	–	6	.850
No. 4 Baylor	14	–	4	.778	27	–	7	.794
No. 12 Texas Tech	12	–	6	.667	27	–	10	.730
No. 25 Texas	10	–	8	.556	22	–	12	.647
TCU	8	–	10	.444	21	–	13	.618
Oklahoma State*	8	–	10	.444	15	–	15	.500
Iowa State	7	–	11	.389	22	–	13	.629
Oklahoma	7	–	11	.389	19	–	16	.543
Kansas State	6	–	12	.333	14	–	17	.452
West Virginia	4	–	14	.222	16	–	17	.485
† 2022 Big 12 Tournament winner *Oklahoma State was ineligible for both the 2022 Big 12 Tournament and the 2022 NCAA tournament due to postseason ban imposed by the NCAA. Rankings from AP poll

The 2021–22 Oklahoma Sooners men's basketball team represented the University of Oklahoma during the 2021–22 NCAA Division I men's basketball season. The team was led by first-year head coach Porter Moser and played their home games at Lloyd Noble Center in Norman, Oklahoma, as members of the Big 12 Conference. They finished the season 19-16, 7-11 in Big 12 Play to finish in 8th place. They defeated Baylor in the quarterfinals of the Big 12 tournament before losing in the semifinals to Texas Tech. They were one of the last four teams not selected for the NCAA tournament so they received an at-large bid to the National Invitation Tournament where they defeated Missouri State in the First Round before losing in the Second Round to St. Bonaventure.

== Previous season ==
In a season limited due to the ongoing COVID-19 pandemic, the Sooners finished the 2020–21 season 16–11, 9–8 in Big 12 play to finish in a tie for sixth place. As the No. 7 seed in the Big 12 tournament, they defeated Iowa State before losing to Kansas in the quarterfinals. They received an at-large bid to the NCAA tournament as the No. 8 seed in the West region. There they defeated Missouri in the First Round before losing to Gonzaga in the Second Round.

Following the season, 10th-year head coach Lon Kruger retired. Shortly thereafter, the school named Loyola head coach Porter Moser the team's new head coach.

== Offseason ==
=== Coaching changes ===
On April 16, 2021, Moser finalized his coaching staff. David Patrick was named associate head coach while Emanuel Dildy and K. T. Turner were named assistants. Clayton Custer was named director of video operations and player development while Matt Gordon was named special assistant to the head coach.

=== Departures ===
Oklahoma Departures
Name	Number	Pos.	Height	Weight	Year	Hometown	Reason for Departure
Victor Iwuakor	0	F	6'7"	223	Junior	Abuja, Nigeria	Transferred to UNLV
Trey Phipps	3	G	6'2"	188	Sophomore	Tulsa, OK	Transferred to Oral Roberts
De'Vion Harmon	11	G	6'2"	198	Sophomore	Denton, TX	Transferred to Oregon
Austin Reaves	12	G	6'5"	206	(redshirt) Senior	Newark, AR	Graduated / Entered 2021 NBA draft
Anyang Garang	13	F	6'9"	205	Freshman	Adelaide, Australia	Transferred to UMBC
Alondes Williams	15	G	6'5"	201	Senior	Milwaukee, WI	Graduated and transferred to Wake Forest
Josh O'Garro	21	G	6'5"	175	Freshman	George Town, Cayman Islands	Transferred to San Jose State
Read Streller	32	F	6'8"	213	Senior	Edmond, OK	Walk-on; graduated
Brady Manek	35	F	6'9"	232	Senior	Harrah, OK	Graduated and transferred to North Carolina
Keller Casey	45	G	6'6"	212	Sophomore	Dallas, TX	Walk-on; left the team
Kur Kuath	52	F	6'10"	220	(redshirt) Senior	Biemnon, South Sudan	Graduated and transferred to Marquette

=== Incoming transfers ===
Oklahoma incoming transfers
Name	Number	Pos.	Height	Weight	Year	Hometown	Previous School	Years Remaining	Date Eligible
Jordan Goldwire	0	G	6'3"	194	Graduate Student	Norcross, GA	Duke	1	October 1, 2021
Marvin Johnson	5	G	6'5"	184	Graduate Student	Ardmore, OK	Eastern Illinois	1	October 1, 2021
Akol Mawein	11	F	6'8"	221	Junior	Sydney, Australia	Navarro College	2	October 1, 2021
Ethan Chargois	15	F/C	6'9"	231	Graduate Student	Tulsa, OK	SMU	1	October 1, 2021
Jacob Groves	34	F	6'9"	210	Junior	Spokane, WA	Eastern Washington	3	October 1, 2021
Tanner Groves	35	F	6'10"	235	(redshirt) Senior	Spokane, WA	Eastern Washington	2	October 1, 2021

=== 2020 recruiting class ===
College recruiting
Name	Hometown	School	Height	Weight	Commit date
Bijan Cortes; PG	Kingfisher, OK	Kingfisher	6 ft 2 in (1.88 m)	170 lb (77 kg)	Jan 26, 2020
Bijan Cortes; PG	Recruit ratings: Rivals: 247Sports: ESPN: (81)				
C. J. Noland; SG	Waxahachie, TX	Waxahachie	6 ft 3 in (1.91 m)	215 lb (98 kg)	Sep 22, 2020
C. J. Noland; SG	Recruit ratings: Rivals: 247Sports: ESPN: (82)				
Alston Mason; PG	Overland Park, KS	Blue Valley Northwest	6 ft 1 in (1.85 m)	170 lb (77 kg)	Apr 7, 2021
Alston Mason; PG	Recruit ratings: Rivals: 247Sports: ESPN: (75)				
Overall recruit ranking:
Note: In many cases, Scout, Rivals, 247Sports, On3, and ESPN may conflict in their listings of height and weight.; In these cases, the average was taken. ESPN grades are on a 100-point scale.; Sources: "2021 Team Ranking". Rivals.

== Roster ==
2021–22 Oklahoma Sooners men's basketball team
Players
Coaches

Pos.	#	Name	Height	Weight	Year	Previous school	Hometown
G	0	Jordan Goldwire	6 ft 3 in (1.91 m)	194 lb (88 kg)	GS	Duke	Norcross, GA
F	1	Jalen Hill	6 ft 6 in (1.98 m)	218 lb (99 kg)	Jr	Clark	Las Vegas, NV
G	2	Umoja Gibson	6 ft 1 in (1.85 m)	169 lb (77 kg)	RS Sr	North Texas	Waco, TX
G	3	Alston Mason	6 ft 2 in (1.88 m)	169 lb (77 kg)	Fr	Blue Valley Northwest	Overland Park, KS
G	5	Marvin Johnson	6 ft 5 in (1.96 m)	184 lb (83 kg)	GS	Eastern Illinois	Ardmore, OK
F	11	Akolda Mawein	6 ft 8 in (2.03 m)	221 lb (100 kg)	Jr	Navarro College	Sydney, Australia
G	14	Bijan Cortes	6 ft 3 in (1.91 m)	194 lb (88 kg)	Fr	Kingfisher	Kingfisher, OK
F/C	15	Ethan Chargois	6 ft 9 in (2.06 m)	231 lb (105 kg)	GS	SMU	Tulsa, OK
C	20	Rick Issanza	7 ft 1 in (2.16 m)	230 lb (104 kg)	RS So	Bella Vista Prep	Kinshasa, Congo
G	22	C. J. Noland	6 ft 2 in (1.88 m)	229 lb (104 kg)	Fr	Waxahachie	Waxahachie, TX
G	30	Jake Moser (W)	6 ft 3 in (1.91 m)	187 lb (85 kg)	Fr	Loyola Academy	Norman, OK
F	34	Jacob Groves	6 ft 9 in (2.06 m)	210 lb (95 kg)	Jr	Eastern Washington	Spokane, WA
F/C	35	Tanner Groves	6 ft 10 in (2.08 m)	235 lb (107 kg)	RS Sr	Eastern Washington	Spokane, WA
G	44	Blake Seacat (W)	6 ft 4 in (1.93 m)	201 lb (91 kg)	Jr	Jenks	Tulsa, OK
G	55	Elijah Harkless	6 ft 3 in (1.91 m)	194 lb (88 kg)	Sr	Cal State Northridge	San Bernardino, CA

Head coach

- Porter Moser (Creighton)

Assistant coach(es)

- David Patrick (Louisiana)
- K. T. Turner (Oklahoma City)
- Emanuel Dildy (Eastern Illinois)

Legend

- (C) Team captain
- (S) Suspended
- (I) Ineligible
- (W) Walk-on
- Injured
- Current redshirt

Roster
Last update: April 21, 2021

== Schedule and results ==
Date time, TV	Rank^{#}	Opponent^{#}	Result	Record	High points	High rebounds	High assists	Site (attendance) city, state
Exhibition
November 1, 2021*; 7:00 p.m., BSOK		Rogers State	W 106–57		20 – Groves	6 – Tied	5 – Chargois	Lloyd Noble Center (5,948); Norman, OK
Regular season
November 9, 2021*; 7:00 p.m., BSOK		Northwestern State	W 77–59	1–0	15 – Tied	9 – Groves	4 – Goldwire	Lloyd Noble Center (6,022); Norman, OK
November 12, 2021*; 7:00 p.m., BSOK		UTSA	W 96–44	2–0	21 – Groves	11 – Hill	5 – Goldwire	Lloyd Noble Center; Norman, OK
November 18, 2021*; 6:00 p.m., ESPN2		vs. East Carolina; Myrtle Beach Invitational Quarterfinals	W 79–74	3–0	13 – Tied	6 – Tied	6 – Goldwire	HTC Center; Conway, SC
November 19, 2021*; 4:00 p.m., ESPN2		vs. Indiana State; Myrtle Beach Invitational Semifinals	W 87–63	4–0	24 – Groves	8 – Groves	5 – Harkless	HTC Center; Conway, SC
November 21, 2021*; 2:00 p.m., ESPN2		vs. Utah State; Myrtle Beach Invitational Championship	L 70–73	4–1	18 – Groves	10 – Hill	3 – Tied	HTC Center; Conway, SC
November 24, 2021*; 7:00 p.m., BSOK		Houston Baptist	W 57–40	5–1	13 – Harkless	13 – Harkless	3 – Tied	Lloyd Noble Center (5,828); Norman, OK
November 27, 2021*; 1:00 p.m., ESPN+		at UCF	W 65–62	6–1	13 – Gibson	4 – Tied	7 – Goldwire	Addition Financial Arena (4,198); Orlando, FL
December 1, 2021*; 7:00 p.m., BSOK		No. 14 Florida	W 74–67	7–1	20 – Groves	8 – Groves	4 – Hill	Lloyd Noble Center (9,539); Norman, OK
December 7, 2021*; 8:00 p.m., ESPN2		Butler; Big East-Big 12 Battle	L 62–66	7–2	16 – Harkless	5 – Groves	4 – Goldwire	Lloyd Noble Center (8,654); Norman, OK
December 11, 2021*; 12:30 p.m., ESPN2		vs. No. 12 Arkansas; Tulsa Showcase	W 88–66	8–2	21 – Harkless	11 – Harkless	6 – Goldwire	BOK Center (12,746); Tulsa, OK
December 19, 2021*; 2:00 p.m., BSOK		UT Arlington	W 70–50	9–2	14 – Gibson	8 – Gibson	6 – Goldwire	Lloyd Noble Center (6,579); Norman, OK
December 22, 2021*; 7:00 p.m., SSTV		Alcorn State	W 72–48	10–2	17 – Gibson	6 – Groves	4 – Harkless	Lloyd Noble Center (5,938); Norman, OK
January 1, 2022; 7:00 p.m., ESPNU		Kansas State	W 71–69	11–2 (1–0)	21 – Harkless	9 – Chargois	4 – Chargois	Lloyd Noble Center (6,777); Norman, OK
January 4, 2022; 6:00 p.m., ESPN2		at No. 1 Baylor	L 74–84	11–3 (1–1)	13 – Groves	6 – Groves	5 – Groves	Ferrell Center (7,523); Waco, TX
January 8, 2022; 5:00 p.m., ESPNU		No. 11 Iowa State	W 79–66	12–3 (2–1)	20 – Gibson	6 – Groves	5 – Cortes	Lloyd Noble Center (8,142); Norman, OK
January 11, 2022; 7:30 p.m., LHN		at No. 21 Texas	L 52–66	12–4 (2–2)	13 – Hill	6 – Groves	4 – Chargois	Frank Erwin Center (13,144); Austin, TX
January 15, 2022; 5:00 p.m., ESPNU		at TCU	L 58–59 ^{OT}	12–5 (2–3)	12 – Hill	14 – Hill	3 – Tied	Schollmaier Arena (7,175); Fort Worth, TX
January 18, 2022; 6:00 p.m., ESPN		No. 7 Kansas	L 64–67	12–6 (2–4)	15 – Goldwire	7 – Hill	4 – Goldwire	Lloyd Noble Center (9,296); Norman, OK
January 22, 2022; 2:00 p.m., ESPN+		No. 5 Baylor	L 51–65	12–7 (2–5)	13 – Gibson	7 – Hill	3 – Goldwire	Lloyd Noble Center (11,339); Norman, OK
January 26, 2022; 7:00 p.m., ESPN2		at West Virginia	W 72–62	13–7 (3–5)	21 – Groves	6 – Groves	3 – Tied	WVU Coliseum (10,997); Morgantown, WV
January 29, 2022*; 1:00 p.m., ESPN		at No. 1 Auburn; Big 12/SEC Challenge	L 68–86	13–8	19 – Goldwire	5 – Groves	4 – Goldwire	Auburn Arena (9,121); Auburn, AL
January 31, 2022; 8:00 p.m., ESPN2		TCU	L 63–72	13–9 (3–6)	13 – Tied	5 – T. Groves	4 – Goldwire	Lloyd Noble Center (5,828); Norman, OK
February 5, 2022; 11:00 a.m., ESPN2		at Oklahoma State; Bedlam Series	L 55–64	13–10 (3–7)	23 – Groves	9 – Groves	3 – Tied	Gallagher-Iba Arena (11,215); Stillwater, OK
February 9, 2022; 8:00 p.m., ESPNU		No. 9 Texas Tech	W 70–55	14–10 (4–7)	30 – Gibson	7 – Hill	4 – Tied	Lloyd Noble Center (7,298); Norman, OK
February 12, 2022; 12:00 p.m., CBS		at No. 8 Kansas	L 69–71	14–11 (4–8)	20 – Goldwire	7 – Hill	5 – Groves	Allen Fieldhouse (16,300); Lawrence, KS
February 15, 2022; 6:00 p.m., ESPN2		No. 20 Texas	L 78–80 ^{OT}	14–12 (4–9)	19 – Harkless	9 – Chargois	2 – Tied	Lloyd Noble Center (8,124); Norman, OK
February 19, 2022; 1:00 p.m., ESPN+		at Iowa State	L 54–75	14–13 (4–10)	15 – Goldwire	4 – Goldwire	3 – Tied	Hilton Coliseum (13,746); Ames, IA
February 22, 2022; 7:00 p.m., ESPN+		at No. 9 Texas Tech	L 42–66	14–14 (4–11)	8 – Hill	4 – Goldwire	3 – Chargois	United Supermarkets Arena (15,098); Lubbock, TX
February 26, 2022; 11:00 a.m., CBS		Oklahoma State; Bedlam Series	W 66–62 ^{OT}	15–14 (5–11)	14 – T. Groves	10 – T. Groves	4 – T. Groves	Lloyd Noble Center (10,156); Norman, OK
March 1, 2022; 6:00 p.m., ESPN2		West Virginia	W 72–59	16–14 (6–11)	17 – T. Groves	10 – T. Groves	4 – Goldwire	Lloyd Noble Center (7,259); Norman, OK
March 5, 2022; 3:00 p.m., ESPN+		at Kansas State	W 78–71	17–14 (7–11)	29 – Gibson	8 – Tied	4 – Goldwire	Bramlage Coliseum (6,635); Manhattan, KS
Big 12 Tournament
March 10, 2022; 6:00 p.m., ESPN	(7)	vs. (2) No. 3 Baylor; Quarterfinals	W 72–67	18–14	15 – J. Groves	9 – J. Groves	6 – Goldwire	T-Mobile Center (15,805); Kansas City, MO
March 11, 2022; 8:30 p.m., ESPN2	(7)	vs. (3) No. 14 Texas Tech; Semifinals	L 55–56	18–15	16 – Gibson	9 – Groves	4 – Johnson	T-Mobile Center (16,557); Kansas City, MO
NIT Tournament
March 15, 2022; 6:00 p.m., ESPN	(1)	Missouri State; First Round – Oklahoma Bracket	W 89–72	19–15	28 – Gibson	9 – T. Groves	8 – Goldwire	Lloyd Noble Center (3,439); Norman, OK
March 20, 2022; 7:00 p.m., ESPNU	(1)	St. Bonaventure; Second Round – Oklahoma Bracket	L 68–70	19–16	26 – Gibson	8 – T. Groves	6 – Chargois	Lloyd Noble Center (4,324); Norman, OK
*Non-conference game. ^{#}Rankings from AP Poll. (#) Tournament seedings in parentheses. All times are in Central Time.
