= 2021–22 Kansas State Wildcats men's basketball team =

2021–22 Kansas State Wildcats men's basketball
- Conference: Big 12 Conference
- Record: 14–17 (6–12 Big 12)
- Head coach: Bruce Weber (10th season)
- Assistant coaches: Chris Lowery; Jermaine Henderson; Shane Southwell
- Home arena: Bramlage Coliseum (12,528)

2021–22 Big 12 men's basketball standings
	Conf.				Overall
Team	W		L	PCT	W		L	PCT
No. 3 Kansas †	14	–	4	.778	34	–	6	.850
No. 4 Baylor	14	–	4	.778	27	–	7	.794
No. 12 Texas Tech	12	–	6	.667	27	–	10	.730
No. 25 Texas	10	–	8	.556	22	–	12	.647
TCU	8	–	10	.444	21	–	13	.618
Oklahoma State*	8	–	10	.444	15	–	15	.500
Iowa State	7	–	11	.389	22	–	13	.629
Oklahoma	7	–	11	.389	19	–	16	.543
Kansas State	6	–	12	.333	14	–	17	.452
West Virginia	4	–	14	.222	16	–	17	.485
† 2022 Big 12 Tournament winner *Oklahoma State was ineligible for both the 2022 Big 12 Tournament and the 2022 NCAA tournament due to postseason ban imposed by the NCAA. Rankings from AP poll

The 2021–22 Kansas State Wildcats men's basketball team represented Kansas State University in the 2021–22 NCAA Division I men's basketball season, their 119th basketball season. The Wildcats were led by 10th-year head coach Bruce Weber and played their home games in Bramlage Coliseum in Manhattan, Kansas as members of the Big 12 Conference. They finished the season 14–17, 6–12 in Big 12 play to finish ninth place. They lost to West Virginia in the first round of the Big 12 tournament.

On March 10, 2022, head coach Bruce Weber announced he was stepping down as head coach. On March 21, the school named longtime Baylor assistant Jerome Tang the team's new head coach.

== Previous season ==
In a season limited due to the ongoing COVID-19 pandemic, the Wildcats finished the 2020–21 season 9–20, 4–14 in Big 12 play to finish in ninth place. They defeated TCU in the first round of the Big 12 tournament before losing to Baylor in the quarterfinals.

== Offseason ==
=== Departures ===
Name	Number	Pos.	Height	Weight	Year	Hometown	Reason for departure
DaJuan Gordon	3	G	6'4"	190	Sophomore	Chicago, IL	Transferred to Missouri
Rudi Williams	5	G	6'3"	182	Junior	Hamilton, ON	Transferred to Coastal Carolina
Antonio Gordon	11	F	6'9"	215	Sophomore	Lawton, OK	Transferred to Southeastern Louisiana
Montavious Murphy	23	F	6'9"	230	Sophomore	Spring, TX	Transferred
Joe Petrakis	35	F	6'9"	220	RS Sophomore	Wichita, KS	Transferred to Western Carolina

=== Incoming transfers ===
Name	Number	Pos.	Height	Weight	Year	Hometown	Previous school
Markquis Nowell	1	G	5'7"	155	Senior	Harlem, NY	Little Rock
Mark Smith	13	G	6'5"	200	RS Senior	Edwardsville, IL	Missouri
Jordan Brooks	23	F	6'4"	190	Sophomore	Grayson, KY	Iona
Ismael Massoud	25	F	6'10"	220	Junior	East Harlem, NY	Wake Forest

=== Recruiting classes ===
==== 2021 recruiting class ====
College recruiting information
Name	Hometown	School	Height	Weight	Commit date
Logan Landers #32 C	Cedarburg, WI	Cedarburg High School	6 ft 10 in (2.08 m)	235 lb (107 kg)	Oct 30, 2020
Logan Landers #32 C	Recruit ratings: Scout: Rivals: 247Sports: ESPN: (78)				
Maximus Edwards; SF	Bronx, NY	Our Saviour Lutheran School	6 ft 5 in (1.96 m)	210 lb (95 kg)	Jan 10, 2021
Maximus Edwards; SF	Recruit ratings: Scout: Rivals: 247Sports: ESPN: (0)				
Overall recruit ranking: Scout: Not Ranked Top 20 Rivals: Not Ranked Top 25 ESPN: Not Ranked Top 25
Note: In many cases, Scout, Rivals, 247Sports, On3, and ESPN may conflict in their listings of height and weight.; In these cases, the average was taken. ESPN grades are on a 100-point scale.; Sources: "2021 Kansas State Basketball Commits". Rivals.; "2021 Kansas State Basketball Commits". Scout.; "2021 Kansas State Basketball Commits". ESPN.; "Scout.com Team Recruiting Rankings". Scout.; "2021 Team Ranking". Rivals.

==== 2022 recruiting class ====
College recruiting information (2021)
Name	Hometown	School	Height	Weight	Commit date
Taj Manning; PF	La Porte, IN	La Lumiere School	6 ft 7 in (2.01 m)	200 lb (91 kg)	Sep 25, 2021
Taj Manning; PF	Recruit ratings: Scout: Rivals: 247Sports: ESPN:				
Overall recruit ranking: Scout: Not Ranked Top 20 Rivals: Not Ranked Top 25 ESPN: Not Ranked Top 25
Note: In many cases, Scout, Rivals, 247Sports, On3, and ESPN may conflict in their listings of height and weight.; In these cases, the average was taken. ESPN grades are on a 100-point scale.; Sources: "2022 Kansas State Basketball Commits". Rivals.; "2022 Kansas State Basketball Commits". Scout.; "2022 Kansas State Basketball Commits". ESPN.; "Scout.com Team Recruiting Rankings". Scout.; "2022 Team Ranking". Rivals.

== Roster ==
2021–22 Kansas State Wildcats men's basketball team
Players
Coaches

Pos.	#	Name	Height	Weight	Year	Previous school	Hometown
G	00	Mike McGuirl	6 ft 3 in (1.91 m)	200 lb (91 kg)	GS	East Catholic High School	Ellington, Connecticut
G	1	Markquis Nowell	5 ft 8 in (1.73 m)	160 lb (73 kg)	Sr	Little Rock	Harlem, New York
G	2	Maximus Edwards	6 ft 5 in (1.96 m)	220 lb (100 kg)	Fr	Our Saviour Lutheran School	Stratford, Connecticut
G	3	Selton Miguel	6 ft 4 in (1.93 m)	210 lb (95 kg)	So	West Oaks Academy	Luanda, Angola
F	4	Seryee Lewis	6 ft 9 in (2.06 m)	230 lb (104 kg)	So	Compass Prep	Chicago, Illinois
F	12	Carlton Linguard Jr.	7 ft 0 in (2.13 m)	220 lb (100 kg)	Jr	Temple College	San Antonio, Texas
G	13	Mark Smith	6 ft 4 in (1.93 m)	225 lb (102 kg)	GS	Missouri	Edwardsville, Illinois
G	14	Drew Honas (W)	6 ft 2 in (1.88 m)	175 lb (79 kg)	Sr	Pratt Community College	Medicine Lodge, Kansas
G	15	Trey Harris (W)	5 ft 11 in (1.8 m)	165 lb (75 kg)	So	Indian Hills Community College	Bloomington, Illinois
F	20	Kaosi Ezeagu	6 ft 10 in (2.08 m)	255 lb (116 kg)	RS Jr	UTEP	Brampton, Ontario
F	21	Davion Bradford	7 ft 0 in (2.13 m)	270 lb (122 kg)	So	Mehlville High School	St. Louis, Missouri
G	22	Luke Kasubke	6 ft 5 in (1.96 m)	190 lb (86 kg)	So	Chaminade College Prep	St. Louis, Missouri
F	23	Jordan Brooks (W)	6 ft 4 in (1.93 m)	190 lb (86 kg)	So	Iona	Grayson, Kentucky
G	24	Nijel Pack	6 ft 0 in (1.83 m)	180 lb (82 kg)	So	Lawrence Central High School	Indianapolis, Indiana
F	25	Ismael Massoud	6 ft 9 in (2.06 m)	210 lb (95 kg)	Jr	Wake Forest	East Harlem, New York
F	33	Logan Landers	6 ft 9 in (2.06 m)	215 lb (98 kg)	Fr	Cedarburg High School	Cedarburg, Wisconsin

Head coach

- Bruce Weber (Milwaukee)

Assistant coach(es)

- Chris Lowery (Southern Illinois)
- Jermaine Henderson (Miami (OH))
- Shane Southwell (Kansas State)

Legend

- (C) Team captain
- (S) Suspended
- (I) Ineligible
- (W) Walk-on
- Injured
- Current redshirt

Roster

== Schedule and results ==
Date time, TV	Rank^{#}	Opponent^{#}	Result	Record	High points	High rebounds	High assists	Site (attendance) city, state
Exhibition
November 4, 2021*; 7:00 p.m., ESPN+		Pittsburg State	W 78–59		18 – Miguel	13 – Smith	5 – Smith	Bramlage Coliseum (5,180); Manhattan, KS
Regular Season
November 10, 2021*; 7:00 p.m., ESPN+		Florida A&M	W 67–57	1–0	18 – Pack	7 – Miguel	6 – Nowell	Bramlage Coliseum (5,296); Manhattan, KS
November 17, 2021*; 7:00 p.m., ESPN+		Omaha	W 79–64	2–0	15 – Tied	8 – Smith	6 – Miguel	Bramlage Coliseum (5,259); Manhattan, KS
November 22, 2021*; 8:00 p.m., ESPNews		vs. No. 13 Arkansas; Hall of Fame Classic semifinals	L 64–72	2–1	14 – Tied	9 – Miguel	4 – McGuirl	T-Mobile Center (9,409); Kansas City, MO
November 23, 2021*; 6:00 p.m., ESPNews		vs. No. 14 Illinois; Hall of Fame Classic 3rd Place Game	L 64–72	2–2	19 – Nowell	6 – Nowell	4 – Miguel	T-Mobile Center (7,255); Kansas City, MO
November 28, 2021*; 4:00 p.m., ESPN+		North Dakota	W 84–42	3–2	18 – Nowell	10 – Smith	5 – Nowell	Bramlage Coliseum (4,998); Manhattan, KS
December 1, 2021*; 7:00 p.m., ESPN+		Albany	W 71–43	4–2	17 – Pack	10 – Smith	3 – 3 Tied	Bramlage Coliseum (5,195); Manhattan, KS
December 5, 2021*; 5:00 p.m., ESPNU		at Wichita State	W 65–59	5–2	16 – Nowell	8 – Nowell	4 – Nowell	Intrust Bank Arena (14,488); Wichita, KS
December 8, 2021*; 8:00 p.m., ESPN2		Marquette; Big East–Big 12 Battle	L 63–64	5–3	17 – Smith	8 – Smith	11 – Nowell	Bramlage Coliseum (7,184); Manhattan, KS
December 12, 2021*; 4:00 p.m., ESPN+		Green Bay	W 82–64	6–3	22 – Nowell	10 – Smith	8 – Nowell	Bramlage Coliseum (5,437); Manhattan, KS
December 19, 2021*; 5:00 p.m., BTN		at Nebraska	W 67–58	7–3	15 – Pack	9 – Ezeagu	5 – Pack	Pinnacle Bank Arena (15,043); Lincoln, NE
December 21, 2021*; 7:00 p.m., ESPN+		McNeese State	W 74–59	8–3	18 – Nowell/Pack	10 – Smith	10 – Nowell	Bramlage Coliseum (5,223); Manhattan, KS
December 29, 2021*; 7:00 p.m., ESPN+		North Florida	Canceled due to COVID-19 protocols					Bramlage Coliseum; Manhattan, KS
January 1, 2022; 7:00 p.m., ESPNU		at Oklahoma	L 69–71	8–4 (0–1)	25 – Smith	16 – Smith	5 – Smith	Lloyd Noble Center (6,777); Norman, OK
January 4, 2022; 7:00 p.m., ESPN+		No. 14 Texas	L 57–70	8–5 (0–2)	21 – Pack	8 – Miguel	3 – Pack	Bramlage Coliseum (6,833); Manhattan, KS
January 8, 2022; 1:00 p.m., ESPN+		at West Virginia	L 68–71	8–6 (0–3)	20 – Pack	8 – Smith	10 – Nowell	WVU Coliseum (11,919); Morgantown, WV
January 12, 2022; 8:00 p.m., ESPNU		TCU	L 57–60	8–7 (0–4)	18 – Nowell	9 – Smith	4 – Nowell	Bramlage Coliseum (5,623); Manhattan, KS
January 15, 2022; 11:00 a.m., ESPNU		No. 19 Texas Tech	W 62–51	9–7 (1–4)	14 – Pack	7 – Pack	9 – Nowell	Bramlage Coliseum (5,971); Manhattan, KS
January 18, 2022; 7:30 p.m., LHN		at No. 23 Texas	W 66–65	10–7 (2–4)	22 – Smith	8 – Smith	3 – Nowell	Frank Erwin Center (11,498); Austin, TX
January 22, 2022; 3:00 p.m., ESPN+		No. 5 Kansas; Sunflower Showdown	L 75–78	10–8 (2–5)	35 – Pack	4 – Tied	6 – Nowell	Bramlage Coliseum (9,737); Manhattan, KS
January 25, 2022; 7:00 p.m., ESPN+		at No. 4 Baylor	L 49–74	10–9 (2–6)	13 – Pack	6 – Smith	4 – Nowell	Ferrell Center (8,062); Waco, TX
January 29, 2022*; 3:00 p.m., ESPNU		at Ole Miss; Big 12/SEC Challenge	L 56–67	10–10	20 – Smith	16 – Smith	7 – Pack	SJB Pavilion (7,135); Oxford, MS
February 2, 2022; 8:00 p.m., ESPNU		Oklahoma State	W 71–68	11–10 (3–6)	22 – Pack	10 – McGuirl	4 – McGuirl	Bramlage Coliseum (5,860); Manhattan, KS
February 5, 2022; 7:00 p.m., ESPNU		at TCU	W 75–63	12–10 (4–6)	20 – Pack	10 – Smith	6 – Nowell	Schollmaier Arena (7,581); Fort Worth, TX
February 9, 2022; 7:00 p.m., ESPN+		No. 10 Baylor	L 60–75	12–11 (4–7)	31 – Pack	8 – Smith	3 – Nowell	Bramlage Coliseum (6,236); Manhattan, KS
February 12, 2022; 3:00 p.m., ESPNU		at Iowa State	W 75–69 ^{OT}	13–11 (5–7)	19 – Pack	9 – Smith	6 – Nowell	Hilton Coliseum (13,477); Ames, IA
February 14, 2022; 6:00 p.m., ESPN2		West Virginia	W 78–73	14–11 (6–7)	21 – Nowell	10 – Smith	5 – Pack	Bramlage Coliseum (5,401); Manhattan, KS
February 19, 2022; 1:00 p.m., ESPNU		at Oklahoma State	L 79–82 ^{OT}	14–12 (6–8)	16 – Pack	10 – Smith	5 – Nowell	Gallagher-Iba Arena (8,796); Stillwater, OK
February 22, 2022; 8:00 p.m., ESPN2		at No. 5 Kansas; Sunflower Showdown	L 83–102	14–13 (6–9)	20 – Nowell	9 – Smith	8 – Nowell	Allen Fieldhouse (16,300); Lawrence, KS
February 26, 2022; 1:00 p.m., ESPNU		Iowa State	L 73–74	14–14 (6–10)	32 – Pack	9 – Smith	4 – Nowell	Bramlage Coliseum (8,090); Manhattan, KS
February 28, 2022; 8:00 p.m., ESPN2		at No. 12 Texas Tech	L 68–73	14–15 (6–11)	18 – McGuirl	6 – Smith	3 – Pack	United Supermarkets Arena (15,098); Lubbock, TX
March 5, 2022; 3:00 p.m., ESPN+		Oklahoma	L 71–78	14–16 (6–12)	22 – Smith	9 – Smith	5 – McGuirl	Bramlage Coliseum (6,635); Manhattan, KS
Big 12 tournament
March 9, 2022; 6:00 p.m., ESPNU	(8)	vs. (9) West Virginia; First round	L 67–73	14–17	18 – Pack	6 – Pack	4 – Nowell	T-Mobile Center (15,295); Kansas City, MO
*Non-conference game. ^{#}Rankings from AP Poll. (#) Tournament seedings in parentheses. All times are in Central Time.

== See also ==
- 2021–22 Kansas State Wildcats women's basketball team
