= 2021–22 Oklahoma State Cowboys basketball team =

American college basketball season

2021–22 Oklahoma State Cowboys basketball
- Conference: Big 12 Conference
- Record: 15–15 (8–10 Big 12)
- Head coach: Mike Boynton (5th season)
- Assistant coaches: Terrence Rencher; Larry Blunt; David Cason
- Home arena: Gallagher-Iba Arena

2021–22 Big 12 men's basketball standings
	Conf.				Overall
Team	W		L	PCT	W		L	PCT
No. 3 Kansas †	14	–	4	.778	34	–	6	.850
No. 4 Baylor	14	–	4	.778	27	–	7	.794
No. 12 Texas Tech	12	–	6	.667	27	–	10	.730
No. 25 Texas	10	–	8	.556	22	–	12	.647
TCU	8	–	10	.444	21	–	13	.618
Oklahoma State*	8	–	10	.444	15	–	15	.500
Iowa State	7	–	11	.389	22	–	13	.629
Oklahoma	7	–	11	.389	19	–	16	.543
Kansas State	6	–	12	.333	14	–	17	.452
West Virginia	4	–	14	.222	16	–	17	.485
† 2022 Big 12 Tournament winner *Oklahoma State was ineligible for both the 2022 Big 12 Tournament and the 2022 NCAA tournament due to postseason ban imposed by the NCAA. Rankings from AP poll

The 2021–22 Oklahoma State Cowboys basketball team represented Oklahoma State University during the 2021–22 NCAA Division I men's basketball season. The team was led by fifth-year head coach Mike Boynton, and played their home games at Gallagher-Iba Arena in Stillwater, Oklahoma as a member of the Big 12 Conference.

On November 3, 2021, the NCAA ruled Oklahoma State ineligible for postseason play for the season due to a player receiving improper benefits.

== Previous season ==
In a season limited due to the ongoing COVID-19 pandemic, the Cowboys finished the 2020–21 season 21–9, 11–7 in Big 12 play to finish in fifth place. They defeated West Virginia and Baylor in the Big 12 tournament before losing to Texas in the championship game. They received an at-large bid to the NCAA tournament as the No. 4 seed in the Midwest Region, where they defeated Liberty in the first round before losing to Oregon State in the second round.

== Offseason ==
=== Departures ===
Name	Number	Pos.	Height	Weight	Year	Hometown	Reason for departure
Cade Cunningham	2	G	6'8"	220	Freshman	Arlington, TX	Declare for 2021 NBA draft
Montreal Pena Jr.	21	F	6'10"	190	Freshman	Arlington, TX	Transferred to South Plains College
Ferron Flavors Jr.	31	G	6'3"	190	GS senior	Federal Way, WA	Graduate transferred to Robert Morris
Mason Robbins	42	F	6'9"	220	Freshman	Edmond, OK	Walk-on; didn't return
Dee Mitchell	55	G	6'2"	190	Junior	Jefferson, TX	Walk-on; didn't return

=== Incoming transfers ===
Name	Number	Pos.	Height	Weight	Year	Hometown	Previous school
Bryce Thompson	1	G	6'5"	195	Sophomore	Tulsa, OK	Kansas
Tyreek Smith	23	F	6'7'	220	RS sophomore	Baton Rouge, LA	Texas Tech
Woody Newton	24	F	6'8"	200	Sophomore	District Heights, MD	Syracuse
Moussa Cissé	33	C	6'10"	225	Sophomore	Conakry, Guinea	Memphis

=== Recruiting classes ===
==== 2021 recruiting class ====
There was no incoming recruiting class of 2021.

==== 2022 recruiting class ====
College recruiting (2022)
Name	Hometown	School	Height	Weight	Commit date
Quion Williams; SG	Mansfield, TX	Mansfield Legacy High School	6 ft 4 in (1.93 m)	185 lb (84 kg)	Aug 5, 2021
Quion Williams; SG	Recruit ratings: Rivals: 247Sports: ESPN: (NR)				
Overall recruit ranking:
Note: In many cases, Scout, Rivals, 247Sports, On3, and ESPN may conflict in their listings of height and weight.; In these cases, the average was taken. ESPN grades are on a 100-point scale.; Sources: "2022 Team Ranking". Rivals.

== Roster ==
2021–22 Oklahoma State Cowboys men's basketball team
Players
Coaches

Pos.	#	Name	Height	Weight	Year	Previous school	Hometown
G	0	Avery Anderson III	6 ft 3 in (1.91 m)	170 lb (77 kg)	Jr	Northwest HS	Justin, TX
G	1	Bryce Thompson	6 ft 5 in (1.96 m)	195 lb (88 kg)	So	Kansas	Tulsa, OK
G	2	Chris Harris Jr.	6 ft 2 in (1.88 m)	200 lb (91 kg)	Jr	South Garland HS	Dallas, TX
G	4	Donovan Williams	6 ft 5 in (1.96 m)	200 lb (91 kg)	So	North Star HS	Rockford, IL
G	5	Rondel Walker	6 ft 4 in (1.93 m)	170 lb (77 kg)	So	Putnam City West HS	Midwest City, OK
F	12	Matthew-Alexander Moncrieffe	6 ft 7 in (2.01 m)	215 lb (98 kg)	So	Orangeville Prep	Toronto, ON
G	13	Isaac Likekele	6 ft 5 in (1.96 m)	215 lb (98 kg)	Sr	Mansfield Timberview HS	Arlington, TX
G	14	Bryce Williams	6 ft 2 in (1.88 m)	180 lb (82 kg)	RS Sr	Ole Miss	Tampa, FL
G	15	Carson Sager (W)	6 ft 4 in (1.93 m)	207 lb (94 kg)	So	Rider HS	Wichita Falls, TX
G/F	20	Keylan Boone	6 ft 8 in (2.03 m)	200 lb (91 kg)	Jr	Tulsa Memorial HS	Tulsa, OK
G	21	Brooks Manzer (W)	6 ft 3 in (1.91 m)	190 lb (86 kg)	Fr	Edmond Memorial HS	Edmond, OK
F	22	Kalib Boone	6 ft 9 in (2.06 m)	210 lb (95 kg)	Jr	Tulsa Memorial HS	Tulsa, OK
F	23	Tyreek Smith	6 ft 7 in (2.01 m)	220 lb (100 kg)	RS So	Texas Tech	Baton Rouge, LA
F	24	Woody Newton	6 ft 8 in (2.03 m)	200 lb (91 kg)	So	Syracuse	District Heights, MD
F	25	Bernard Kouma	6 ft 10 in (2.08 m)	240 lb (109 kg)	Jr	South Plains CC	N'Djamena, Chad
F	33	Moussa Cissé	6 ft 10 in (2.08 m)	225 lb (102 kg)	So	Memphis	Conakry, Guinea
G	35	Weston Church (W)	6 ft 3 in (1.91 m)	180 lb (82 kg)	So	Fairview HS	Fairview, OK

Head coach

- Mike Boynton Jr. (South Carolina)

Assistant coach(es)

- Terrence Rencher (Texas)
- Larry Blunt (James Madison)
- David Cason (Illinois State)

Legend

- (C) Team captain
- (S) Suspended
- (I) Ineligible
- (W) Walk-on
- Injured
- Current redshirt

Roster

== Schedule and results ==
The Big 12 allows all 10 teams to participate in the Big 12 Tournament to determine the conference's automatic bid to the NCAA Tournament with every team being guaranteed at least one game. However, due to the Cowboys being ineligible for NCAA Tournament, they did not participate in the Big 12 Tournament.

Date time, TV	Rank^{#}	Opponent^{#}	Result	Record	High points	High rebounds	High assists	Site (attendance) city, state
Exhibition
November 4, 2021*; 7:00 p.m., ESPN+		Central Oklahoma	W 76–68		14 – Anderson/Cissé	6 – Moncrieffe	6 – Likekele	Gallagher-Iba Arena (8,368); Stillwater, OK
Regular season
November 9, 2021*; 7:00 p.m., ESPN+		UT Arlington	W 88–45	1–0	17 – Cissé	9 – Cissé	6 – Likekele	Gallagher-Iba Arena (7,981); Stillwater, OK
November 12, 2021*; 7:00 p.m., ESPN+		Oakland	L 55–56	1–1	12 – Tied	9 – Likekele	5 – Likekele	Gallagher-Iba Arena (8,729); Stillwater, OK
November 14, 2021*; 2:00 p.m., ESPN+		Prairie View A&M	W 72–59	2–1	10 – Cissé	7 – Tied	7 – B. Williams	Gallagher-Iba Arena (7,346); Stillwater, OK
November 16, 2021*; 4:00 p.m., ESPN+		vs. UMass Lowell; Basketball Hall of Fame Showcase	W 80–58	3–1	14 – Thompson	11 – Cissé	4 – Tied	Mohegan Sun Arena; Uncasville, CT
November 17, 2021*; 7:00 p.m., CBSSN		vs. NC State; Basketball Hall of Fame Showcase	W 74–68	4–1	20 – Ka. Boone	7 – Likekele	4 – B. Williams	Mohegan Sun Arena (1,500); Uncasville, CT
November 22, 2021*; 7:00 p.m., ESPN+		College of Charleston	W 96–66	5–1	15 – Tied	5 – Tied	5 – Likekele	Gallagher-Iba Arena (8,307); Stillwater, OK
November 26, 2021*; 3:00 p.m.		at Oral Roberts	W 78–77 ^{OT}	6–1	21 – B. Williams	9 – Likekele	3 – Likekele	Mabee Center (6,094); Tulsa, OK
December 1, 2021*; 7:00 p.m., ESPN+		Wichita State	L 51–60	6–2	17 – Anderson III	10 – Moncrieffe	3 – Likekele	Gallagher-Iba Arena (8,134); Stillwater, OK
December 5, 2021*; 4:00 p.m., ESPN2		Xavier; Big East–Big 12 Battle	L 71–77	6–3	26 – Anderson	9 – Cisse	4 – Likekele	Gallagher-Iba Arena (7,326); Stillwater, OK
December 13, 2021*; 7:00 p.m., ESPN+		Cleveland State	W 98–93 ^{OT}	7–3	29 – Williams	8 – Boone	4 – Williams	Gallagher-Iba Arena (6,961); Stillwater, OK
December 18, 2021*; 6:00 p.m., ESPNU		vs. No. 14 Houston; Hoop Hype XL College Basketball Showcase	L 61–72	7–4	17 – Williams	9 – Boone	4 – Likele	Dickies Arena; Fort Worth, TX
December 21, 2021*; 8:00 pm, ESPNU		vs. No. 8 USC; Compete 4 Cause Classic	Canceled due to COVID issues from USC					Paycom Center; Oklahoma City, OK
January 4, 2022; 8:00 p.m., ESPN2		No. 6 Kansas	L 63–74	7–5 (0–1)	16 – Likekele	12 – Likekele	3 – Likekele	Gallagher-Iba Arena (8,246); Stillwater, OK
January 8, 2022; 1:00 p.m., CBS		No. 14 Texas	W 64–51	8–5 (1–1)	17 – Boone	6 – Tied	5 – Likekele	Gallagher-Iba Arena (8,204); Stillwater, OK
January 11, 2022; 8:00 p.m., ESPN2		at West Virginia	L 60–70	8–6 (1–2)	22 – Bridges	8 – Tied	5 – Sherman	WVU Coliseum (10,352); Morgantown, WV
January 13, 2022; 6:00 p.m., ESPN+		at No. 19 Texas Tech	L 57–78	8–7 (1–3)	14 – Thompson	6 – Tied	3 – Tied	United Supermarkets Arena (14,853); Lubbock, TX
January 15, 2022; 4:00 p.m., ESPN		at No. 1 Baylor	W 61–54	9–7 (2–3)	19 – Thompson	8 – Smith	6 – Williams	Ferrell Center (8,861); Waco, TX
January 19, 2022; 7:00 p.m., ESPN+		TCU	W 57–56	10–7 (3–3)	12 – Tied	7 – Smith	3 – Williams	Gallagher-Iba Arena (8,400); Stillwater, OK
January 22, 2022; 1:00 p.m., ESPN2		at No. 23 Texas	L 51–56	10–8 (3–4)	20 – Thompson	7 – Likekele	3 – Walker	Frank Erwin Center (13,203); Austin, TX
January 26, 2022; 7:00 p.m., ESPN+		No. 23 Iowa State	L 81–84 ^{OT}	10–9 (3–5)	34 – Anderson III	7 – Cisse	8 – Likekele	Gallagher-Iba Arena (8,271); Stillwater, OK
January 29, 2022*; 3:00 p.m., ESPN2		at Florida; Big 12/SEC Challenge	L 72-81	10–10	14 – Likekele	7 – Moncrieffe	3 – Likekele	O'Connell Center (10,151); Gainesville, FL
February 2, 2022; 8:00 p.m., ESPNU		at Kansas State	L 68–71	10–11 (3–6)	22 – Thompson	7 – Tied	7 – Anderson III	Bramlage Coliseum (5,860); Manhattan, KS
February 5, 2022; 11:00 a.m., ESPN2		Oklahoma; Bedlam Series	W 64–55	11–11 (4–6)	12 – Tied	7 – Likekele	6 – Likekele	Gallagher-Iba Arena (11,215); Stillwater, OK
February 8, 2022; 6:00 p.m., ESPNU		at TCU	L 73–77	11–12 (4–7)	19 – Likekele	6 – Tied	5 – Likekele	Schollmaier Arena (5,246); Fort Worth, TX
February 12, 2022; 1:00 p.m., ESPN2		West Virginia	W 81–58	12–12 (5–7)	18 – Cisse	10 – Cisse	4 – Williams	Gallagher-Iba Arena (8,013); Stillwater, OK
February 14, 2022; 8:00 p.m., ESPN		at No. 6 Kansas	L 62–76	12–13 (5–8)	15 – Anderson	11 – Cisse	4 – Anderson	Allen Fieldhouse (16,300); Lawrence, KS
February 19, 2022; 1:00 p.m., ESPNU		Kansas State	W 82–79 ^{OT}	13–13 (6–8)	23 – Thompson	7 – Anderson	8 – Williams	Gallagher-Iba Arena (8,976); Stillwater, OK
February 21, 2022; 8:00 p.m., ESPN		No. 10 Baylor	L 64–66 ^{OT}	13–14 (6–9)	15 – Thompson	10 – Cisse	4 – Williams	Gallagher-Iba Arena (8,701); Stillwater, OK
February 26, 2022; 11:00 a.m., CBS		at Oklahoma; Bedlam Series	L 62–66 ^{OT}	13–15 (6–10)	25 – Anderson	10 – Cisse	4 – Likekele	Lloyd Noble Center (10,156); Norman, OK
March 2, 2022; 6:00 p.m., ESPN+		at Iowa State	W 53–36	14–15 (7–10)	12 – Anderson	12 – Cisse	5 – Likekele	Hilton Coliseum (12,699); Ames, IA
March 5, 2022; 2:00 p.m., ESPN+		No. 12 Texas Tech	W 52–51	15–15 (8–10)	12 – Walker	10 – Cisse	3 – Thompson	Gallagher-Iba Arena (10,184); Stillwater, OK
*Non-conference game. ^{#}Rankings from AP Poll. (#) Tournament seedings in parentheses. All times are in Central Time.
