= 2022 Big 12 men's basketball tournament =

American college basketball competition

- Classification: Division I
- Season: 2021–22
- Teams: 9
- Site: T-Mobile Center; Kansas City, Missouri
- Champions: Kansas (11th title)
- Winning coach: Bill Self (8th title)
- MVP: Ochai Agbaji (Kansas)
- Attendance: 79,846; 16,344 (championship)
- Top scorer: Ochai Agbaji (Kansas) (56 points)
- Television: ESPN, ESPN2, ESPNU

2021–22 Big 12 men's basketball standings
| | Conf. | | | | Overall |
| Team | W | | L | PCT | W | | L | PCT |
|---|---|---|---|---|---|---|---|---|
| No. 3 Kansas † | 14 | – | 4 | .778 | 34 | – | 6 | .850 |
| No. 4 Baylor | 14 | – | 4 | .778 | 27 | – | 7 | .794 |
| No. 12 Texas Tech | 12 | – | 6 | .667 | 27 | – | 10 | .730 |
| No. 25 Texas | 10 | – | 8 | .556 | 22 | – | 12 | .647 |
| TCU | 8 | – | 10 | .444 | 21 | – | 13 | .618 |
| Oklahoma State* | 8 | – | 10 | .444 | 15 | – | 15 | .500 |
| Iowa State | 7 | – | 11 | .389 | 22 | – | 13 | .629 |
| Oklahoma | 7 | – | 11 | .389 | 19 | – | 16 | .543 |
| Kansas State | 6 | – | 12 | .333 | 14 | – | 17 | .452 |
| West Virginia | 4 | – | 14 | .222 | 16 | – | 17 | .485 |
† 2022 Big 12 Tournament winner *Oklahoma State was ineligible for both the 2022 Big 12 Tournament and the 2022 NCAA tournament due to postseason ban imposed by the NCAA. Rankings from AP poll

The 2022 Big 12 men's basketball tournament was a postseason men's basketball tournament for teams of the Big 12 Conference. It was played March 9–12, 2022, in Kansas City, Missouri, at the T-Mobile Center. Kansas won the tournament, their 12th Big 12 Tournament championship, to earn the conference's automatic berth in the 2022 NCAA tournament. The tournament was sponsored by Phillips 66.

== Seeds ==
For the second time in conference history and the first time since the conference became a 10-team conference, the entire conference did not participate in the tournament. Oklahoma State did not participate due to its postseason ban. The only other time this happened was in 2004, when Baylor missed the tournament.

The top seven teams earned a first-round bye. Teams were seeded by record within the conference, with a tiebreaker system to seed teams with identical conference records. The first tiebreaker, as is standard in most sports, is head-to-head results between the tied teams. The second tiebreaker is taking the head-to-head results against each team in the conference beginning with the first-place team and working down until there is no longer a tie.

| Seed | School | Conf | Tiebreaker 1 | Tiebreaker 2 | Tiebreaker 3 | Tiebreaker 4 | Tiebreaker 5 |
|---|---|---|---|---|---|---|---|
| 1 | Kansas | 14–4 | 1–1 vs Baylor | 1–1 vs Texas Tech | | | |
| 2 | Baylor | 14–4 | 1–1 vs Kansas | 0–2 vs Texas Tech | | | |
| 3 | Texas Tech | 12–6 | | | | | |
| 4 | Texas | 10–8 | | | | | |
| 5 | TCU | 8–10 | | | | | |
| N/A | Oklahoma State | 8–10 | Ineligible, would be the 6th seed if eligible | | | | |
| 6 | Iowa State | 7–11 | 1–1 vs Oklahoma | 0–2 vs Kansas | 0–2 vs Baylor | 1–1 vs Texas Tech | 1–1 vs Texas |
| 7 | Oklahoma | 7–11 | 1–1 vs Iowa State | 0–2 vs Kansas | 0–2 vs Baylor | 1–1 vs Texas Tech | 0–2 vs Texas |
| 8 | Kansas State | 6–12 | | | | | |
| 9 | West Virginia | 4–14 | | | | | |

== Schedule ==
| Game | Time* | Matchup^{#} | Final score | Television | Attendance |
First round – Wednesday, March 9
| 1 | 6:00 p.m. | No. 8 Kansas State vs No. 9 West Virginia | 67–73 | ESPNU | 15,295 |
Quarterfinals – Thursday, March 10
| 2 | 11:30 a.m. | No. 4 Texas vs No. 5 TCU | 60–65 | ESPN2 | 15,845 |
| 3 | 2:00 p.m. | No. 1 Kansas vs No. 9 West Virginia | 87–63 | ESPN | 15,845 |
| 4 | 6:00 p.m. | No. 2 Baylor vs No. 7 Oklahoma | 67–72 | ESPN | 15,805 |
| 5 | 8:30 p.m. | No. 3 Texas Tech vs No. 6 Iowa State | 72–41 | ESPN2 | 15,805 |
Semifinals – Friday, March 11
| 6 | 6:00 p.m. | No. 5 TCU vs No. 1 Kansas | 62–75 | ESPN2 | 16,557 |
| 7 | 8:30 p.m. | No. 7 Oklahoma vs No. 3 Texas Tech | 55–56 | ESPN2 | 16,557 |
Championship – Saturday, March 12
| 8 | 5:00 p.m. | No. 1 Kansas vs No. 3 Texas Tech | 74–65 | ESPN | 16,344 |
*Game times in CST. #-Rankings denote tournament seed

== Bracket ==
First round Wednesday, March 9
8 | Kansas State | 67
9 | West Virginia | 73

Quarterfinals; Thursday, March 10
1 | Kansas | 87
9 | West Virginia | 63
4 | Texas | 60
5 | TCU | 65
2 | Baylor | 67
7 | Oklahoma | 72
3 | Texas Tech | 72
6 | Iowa State | 41

Semifinals; Friday, March 11
1 | Kansas | 75
5 | TCU | 62
7 | Oklahoma | 55
3 | Texas Tech | 56

Championship; Saturday, March 12
1 | Kansas | 74
3 | Texas Tech | 65
