= 2021–22 TCU Horned Frogs men's basketball team =

American college basketball season

2021–22 TCU Horned Frogs men's basketball

NCAA tournament, Second Round
- Conference: Big 12 Conference
- Record: 21–13 (8–10 Big 12)
- Head coach: Jamie Dixon (6th season)
- Assistant coaches: Tony Benford; Duane Broussard; Jamie McNeilly
- Home arena: Schollmaier Arena

2021–22 Big 12 men's basketball standings
	Conf.				Overall
Team	W		L	PCT	W		L	PCT
No. 3 Kansas †	14	–	4	.778	34	–	6	.850
No. 4 Baylor	14	–	4	.778	27	–	7	.794
No. 12 Texas Tech	12	–	6	.667	27	–	10	.730
No. 25 Texas	10	–	8	.556	22	–	12	.647
TCU	8	–	10	.444	21	–	13	.618
Oklahoma State*	8	–	10	.444	15	–	15	.500
Iowa State	7	–	11	.389	22	–	13	.629
Oklahoma	7	–	11	.389	19	–	16	.543
Kansas State	6	–	12	.333	14	–	17	.452
West Virginia	4	–	14	.222	16	–	17	.485
† 2022 Big 12 Tournament winner *Oklahoma State was ineligible for both the 2022 Big 12 Tournament and the 2022 NCAA tournament due to postseason ban imposed by the NCAA. Rankings from AP poll

The 2021–22 TCU Horned Frogs men's basketball team represented Texas Christian University during the 2021–22 NCAA Division I men's basketball season. The team was led by sixth-year head coach Jamie Dixon, and played their home games at Schollmaier Arena in Fort Worth, Texas as a member of the Big 12 Conference. They finished the season 21–13, 8–10 in Big 12 play to finish in fifth place. As the No. 5 seed in the Big 12 tournament, they defeated Texas in the quarterfinals, before losing to Kansas in the semifinals. They received an at-large bid to the NCAA tournament as the No. 9 seed in the South Region, where they defeated Seton Hall in the first round before losing to Arizona in the second round in an overtime thriller.

With their win over Seton Hall in the first round, the Horned Frogs won their first NCAA tournament game since 1987.

== Previous season ==
In a season limited due to the ongoing COVID-19 pandemic, the Horned Frogs finished the 2020–21 season 12–14, 5–11 in Big 12 play to finish in a tie for eighth place. They lost in the first round of the Big 12 tournament to Kansas State.

== Offseason ==
=== Departures ===
Name	Number	Pos.	Height	Weight	Year	Hometown	Reason for departure
Mickey Pearson Jr.	2	F	6'7"	210	RS freshman	Lincoln, AL	Transferred to Ball State
PJ Fuller	4	G	6'3"	175	Sophomore	Seattle, WA	Transferred to Washington
Taryn Todd	11	G	6'5"	180	RS freshman	Vaughn, ON	Transferred to New Mexico
Dylan Arnette	13	G	6'3"	185	RS sophomore	DeSoto, TX	Transferred to Western New Mexico
Terren Frank	15	F	6'8"	235	Freshman	Los Angeles, CA	Transferred to Vanderbilt
Kevin Samuel	21	C	6'11"	255	RS junior	Codrington Village, Barbuda	Transferred to Florida Gulf Coast
RJ Nembhard	22	G	6'5"	200	RS junior	Keller, TX	Declared for the 2021 NBA draft
Jaedon LeDee	23	F	6'9"	240	Junior	Houston, TX	Transferred to San Diego State
Owen Aschieris	31	G	6'2"	175	Senior	San Diego, CA	Graduate transferred
Kevin Easley Jr.	34	F	6'7"	225	RS sophomore	Indianapolis, IN	Transferred to Duquesne

=== Incoming transfers ===
Name	Number	Pos.	Height	Weight	Year	Hometown	Previous school
Micah Peavy	0	G	6'7"	215	Sophomore	Cibolo, TX	Texas Tech
Emanuel Miller	2	F	6'7"	215	Junior	Scarborough, ON	Texas A&M
Damion Baugh	10	G	6'4"	195	Junior	Nashville, TN	Memphis
Xavier Cork	12	F	6'9"	228	Junior	Sulphur Springs, TX	Western Carolina
Shahada Wells	13	G	6'0"	180	Senior	Amarillo, TX	UT Arlington
JaKobe Coles	21	F	6'7"	225	Sophomore	Denton, TX	Butler
Souleymane Doumbia	25	C	6'11"	235	Junior	Abidjan, Ivory Coast	Navarro College
Maxwell Evans	33	G	6'2"	200	Graduate student	Houston, TX	Vanderbilt

=== Recruiting classes ===
==== 2021 recruiting class ====
There was no incoming recruiting class of 2021.

==== 2022 recruiting class ====
College recruiting (2022)
Name	Hometown	School	Height	Weight	Commit date
P. J. Haggerty #29 SG	Missouri City, TX	Crosby High School	6 ft 3 in (1.91 m)	170 lb (77 kg)	Jun 14, 2021
P. J. Haggerty #29 SG	Recruit ratings: Scout: Rivals: 247Sports: ESPN: (81)				
Overall recruit ranking:
Note: In many cases, Scout, Rivals, 247Sports, On3, and ESPN may conflict in their listings of height and weight.; In these cases, the average was taken. ESPN grades are on a 100-point scale.; Sources: "2022 TCU Commits". Rivals.; "2022 Team Ranking". Rivals.

== Roster ==
2021–22 TCU Horned Frogs men's basketball team
Players
Coaches

Pos.	#	Name	Height	Weight	Year	Previous school	Hometown
G	0	Micah Peavy	6 ft 7 in (2.01 m)	215 lb (98 kg)	So	Texas Tech	Cibolo, Texas
G	1	Mike Miles Jr.	6 ft 2 in (1.88 m)	195 lb (88 kg)	So	Lancaster High School	Highland Hills, Texas
F	2	Emanuel Miller	6 ft 7 in (2.01 m)	215 lb (98 kg)	Jr	Texas A&M	Scarborough, Ontario
G	3	Francisco Farabello	6 ft 3 in (1.91 m)	178 lb (81 kg)	Jr	NBA Global Academy	Cañada de Gómez, Argentina
C	4	Eddie Lampkin Jr.	6 ft 11 in (2.11 m)	268 lb (122 kg)	So	Morton Ranch High School	Houston, Texas
F	5	Chuck O'Bannon Jr.	6 ft 6 in (1.98 m)	215 lb (98 kg)	RS Sr	USC	Las Vegas, Nevada
G	10	Damion Baugh	6 ft 4 in (1.93 m)	195 lb (88 kg)	Jr	Memphis	Nashville, Tennessee
G	11	Darius Ford (W)	5 ft 10 in (1.78 m)	142 lb (64 kg)	Fr	Paul Laurence Dunbar YMLA	Fort Worth, Texas
F	12	Xavier Cork	6 ft 9 in (2.06 m)	228 lb (103 kg)	Jr	Western Carolina	Sulphur Springs, Texas
G	13	Shahada Wells	6 ft 0 in (1.83 m)	180 lb (82 kg)	Sr	UT Arlington	Amarillo, Texas
G	14	Brandon Childress (W)	6 ft 4 in (1.93 m)	178 lb (81 kg)	Fr	Vista Ridge High School	Little Rock, Arkansas
F	21	JaKobe Coles	6 ft 7 in (2.01 m)	225 lb (102 kg)	So	Butler	Denton, Texas
C	25	Souleymane Doumbia	6 ft 11 in (2.11 m)	235 lb (107 kg)	Jr	Navarro College	Abidjan, Ivory Coast
G	30	Harrison Young	5 ft 11 in (1.8 m)	170 lb (77 kg)	Sr	Impact Basketball Academy	Auckland, New Zealand
G	33	Maxwell Evans	6 ft 2 in (1.88 m)	200 lb (91 kg)	GS	Vanderbilt	Houston, Texas
G	35	Cole Despie (W)	6 ft 3 in (1.91 m)	180 lb (82 kg)	Fr	Bellarmine College Prep	San Jose, California

Head coach

- Jamie Dixon (TCU)

Assistant coach(es)

- Tony Benford (Texas Tech)
- Duane Broussard (Bradley)
- Jamie McNeilly (LSU New Orleans)

Legend

- (C) Team captain
- (S) Suspended
- (I) Ineligible
- (W) Walk-on
- Injured
- Current redshirt

Roster

== Schedule and results ==
Date time, TV	Rank^{#}	Opponent^{#}	Result	Record	Site (attendance) city, state
Regular season
November 11, 2021*; 7:00 p.m., ESPN+		McNeese State	W 77–61	1–0	Schollmaier Arena (5,267); Fort Worth, TX
November 15, 2021*; 7:00 p.m., ESPN+		Southern Miss	W 83–51	2–0	Schollmaier Arena (4,915); Fort Worth, TX
November 18, 2021*; 7:00 p.m., ESPN+		Nicholls; SoCal Challenge campus game	W 63–50	3–0	Schollmaier Arena (4,825); Fort Worth, TX
November 22, 2021*; 9:30 p.m., CBSSN		vs. Santa Clara; SoCal Challenge Surf Division	L 66–85	3–1	The Pavilion at JSerra; San Juan Capistrano, CA
November 24, 2021*; 9:30 p.m., CBSSN		vs. Pepperdine; SoCal Challenge Surf Division third place	W 73–64	4–1	The Pavilion at JSerra (1,700); San Juan Capistrano, CA
November 29, 2021*; 7:00 p.m., ESPN+		Austin Peay	W 68–51	5–1	Schollmaier Arena (4,813); Fort Worth, TX
December 2, 2021*; 7:00 p.m., ESPN+		Oral Roberts	W 71–63	6–1	Schollmaier Arena (5,023); Fort Worth, TX
December 8, 2021*; 7:00 p.m., ESPN+		vs. Utah; Simmons Bank Showdown	W 76–62	7–1	Dickies Arena (2,231); Fort Worth, TX
December 11, 2021*; 5:30 p.m., SECN		vs. Texas A&M; The Battleground 2K21	W 68–64	8–1	Toyota Center (3,100); Houston, TX
December 18, 2021*; 1:10 p.m., FS1		at Georgetown; Big East–Big 12 Battle	W 80–73	9–1	Capital One Arena (5,053); Washington, D.C.
December 21, 2021*; 7:00 p.m., ESPN+		Grambling State	W 90–55	10–1	Schollmaier Arena; Fort Worth, TX
December 29, 2021*; 3:00 p.m., ESPN+		Texas Southern	Cancelled due to COVID-19 issues with TCU.		Schollmaier Arena; Fort Worth, TX
January 1, 2022; 4:00 p.m., ESPN+		at No. 6 Kansas	Postponed due to COVID-19 issues with TCU. Rescheduled for March 3.		Allen Fieldhouse; Lawrence, KS
January 3, 2022; 6:00 p.m., ESPNU		West Virginia	Postponed due to COVID-19 issues with TCU. Rescheduled for February 21.		Schollmaier Arena; Fort Worth, TX
January 8, 2022; 4:00 p.m., ESPN+		No. 1 Baylor	L 64–76	10–2 (0–1)	Schollmaier Arena (5,562); Fort Worth, TX
January 12, 2022; 8:00 p.m., ESPNU		at Kansas State	W 60–57	11–2 (1–1)	Bramlage Coliseum (5,623); Manhattan, KS
January 15, 2022; 3:00 p.m., ESPNU		Oklahoma	W 59–58 ^{OT}	12–2 (2–1)	Schollmaier Arena (7,175); Fort Worth, TX
January 19, 2022; 7:00 p.m., ESPN+		at Oklahoma State	L 56–57	12–3 (2–2)	Gallagher-Iba Arena (8,400); Stillwater, OK
January 22, 2022; 3:00 p.m., ESPN2		at No. 15 Iowa State	W 59–44	13–3 (3–2)	Hilton Coliseum (14,267); Ames, IA
January 25, 2022; 8:00 p.m., ESPNU		Texas	L 50–73	13–4 (3–3)	Schollmaier Arena (8,412); Fort Worth, TX
January 29, 2022*; 11:00 a.m., ESPN2		No. 19 LSU; Big 12/SEC Challenge	W 77–68	14–4	Schollmaier Arena (6,539); Fort Worth, TX
January 31, 2022; 8:00 p.m., ESPN2		at Oklahoma	W 72–63	15–4 (4–3)	Lloyd Noble Center (5,826); Norman, OK
February 5, 2022; 7:00 p.m., ESPNU		Kansas State	L 63–75	15–5 (4–4)	Schollmaier Arena (7,581); Fort Worth, TX
February 8, 2022; 6:00 p.m., ESPNU		Oklahoma State	W 77–73	16–5 (5–4)	Schollmaier Arena (5,246); Fort Worth, TX
February 12, 2022; 3:00 p.m., ESPN+		at No. 9 Texas Tech	L 69–82	16–6 (5–5)	United Supermarkets Arena (14,810); Lubbock, TX
February 15, 2022; 8:00 p.m., ESPNU		Iowa State	L 51–54	16–7 (5–6)	Schollmaier Arena (5,567); Fort Worth, TX
February 19, 2022; 1:00 p.m., ESPN2		at No. 7 Baylor	L 62–72	16–8 (5–7)	Ferrell Center (10,072); Waco, TX
February 21, 2022; 7:00 p.m., ESPN+		West Virginia	W 77–67	17–8 (6–7)	Schollmaier Arena (5,374); Fort Worth, TX
February 23, 2022; 6:00 p.m., ESPN2		at No. 20 Texas	L 66–75	17–9 (6–8)	Frank Erwin Center (12,017); Austin, TX
February 26, 2022; 5:00 p.m., ESPN2		No. 9 Texas Tech	W 69–66	18–9 (7–8)	Schollmaier Arena (7,026); Fort Worth, TX
March 1, 2022; 7:00 p.m., ESPN+		No. 6 Kansas	W 74–64	19–9 (8–8)	Schollmaier Arena (6,566); Fort Worth, TX
March 3, 2022; 7:00 p.m., ESPN+		at No. 6 Kansas	L 68–72	19–10 (8–9)	Allen Fieldhouse (16,300); Lawrence, KS
March 5, 2022; 1:00 p.m., ESPN+		at West Virginia	L 64–70	19–11 (8–10)	WVU Coliseum (11,324); Morgantown, WV
Big 12 tournament
March 10, 2022; 11:30 a.m., ESPN2	(5)	vs. (4) No. 22 Texas; Quarterfinals	W 65–60	20–11	T-Mobile Center (15,845); Kansas City, MO
March 11, 2022; 6:00 p.m., ESPN2	(5)	vs. (1) No. 6 Kansas; Semifinals	L 62–75	20–12	T-Mobile Center (16,557); Kansas City, MO
NCAA tournament
March 18, 2022*; 9:00 p.m., TruTV	(9 S)	vs. (8 S) Seton Hall; First Round	W 69–42	21–12	Viejas Arena (11,399); San Diego, CA
March 20, 2022*; 8:40 p.m., TBS	(9 S)	vs. (1 S) No. 2 Arizona; Second Round	L 80–85 ^{OT}	21–13	Viejas Arena (11,425); San Diego, CA
*Non-conference game. ^{#}Rankings from AP Poll. (#) Tournament seedings in parentheses. All times are in Central Time.
