= 2021–22 West Virginia Mountaineers men's basketball team =

American college basketball season

2021–22 West Virginia Mountaineers men's basketball
- Conference: Big 12 Conference
- Record: 16–17 (4–14 Big 12)
- Head coach: Bob Huggins (15th season)
- Associate head coach: Larry Harrison
- Assistant coaches: Ron Everhart; Erik Martin
- Home arena: WVU Coliseum

2021–22 Big 12 men's basketball standings
	Conf.				Overall
Team	W		L	PCT	W		L	PCT
No. 3 Kansas †	14	–	4	.778	34	–	6	.850
No. 4 Baylor	14	–	4	.778	27	–	7	.794
No. 12 Texas Tech	12	–	6	.667	27	–	10	.730
No. 25 Texas	10	–	8	.556	22	–	12	.647
TCU	8	–	10	.444	21	–	13	.618
Oklahoma State*	8	–	10	.444	15	–	15	.500
Iowa State	7	–	11	.389	22	–	13	.629
Oklahoma	7	–	11	.389	19	–	16	.543
Kansas State	6	–	12	.333	14	–	17	.452
West Virginia	4	–	14	.222	16	–	17	.485
† 2022 Big 12 Tournament winner *Oklahoma State was ineligible for both the 2022 Big 12 Tournament and the 2022 NCAA tournament due to postseason ban imposed by the NCAA. Rankings from AP poll

The 2021–22 West Virginia Mountaineers men's basketball team represented West Virginia University during the 2021–22 NCAA Division I men's basketball season. The Mountaineers were coached by Bob Huggins, in his 15th season as WVU's head coach, and played their home games at the WVU Coliseum in Morgantown, West Virginia as members of the Big 12 Conference.

== Previous season ==
In a season limited due to the ongoing COVID-19 pandemic, the Mountaineers finished the 2020–21 season 19–10, 11–6 in Big 12 play to finish in a tie for third place in the conference. They lost in the quarterfinals of the Big 12 tournament to Oklahoma State. They received an at-large bid to the NCAA tournament where they defeated Morehead State in the first round before losing to Syracuse in Second Round.

== Offseason ==
=== Departures ===
Name	Pos.	Number	Height	Weight	Previous School	Hometown	Reason for Leaving
Derek Culver	1	F	6'10"	255	Junior	Youngstown, OH	Declared for the 2021 NBA draft
Miles McBride	4	G	6'2"	200	Sophomore	Cincinnati, OH	Declared for the 2021 NBA draft
Jordan McCabe	5	G	6'0"	188	Junior	Kaukauna, WI	Transferred to UNLV
Emmitt Matthews Jr.	11	F	6'7"	215	Junior	Tacoma, WA	Transferred to Washington
Jay Moore	20	G	6'3"	195	Freshman	Beckley, WV	Walk-on; transferred

=== Incoming transfers ===
Name	Number	Pos.	Height	Weight	Year	Hometown	Previous School
Pauly Paulicap	1	F	6'8"	235	Graduate Student	Elmont, NY	DePaul
Dimon Carringan	5	F	6'9"	230	Graduate Student	Boston, MA	FIU
Malik Curry	10	G	6'1"	190	Graduate Student	Wilmington, DE	Old Dominion

=== Recruiting classes ===
==== 2021 recruiting class ====
College recruiting information
Name	Hometown	School	Height	Weight	Commit date
Seth Wilson #28 PG	Lorain, OH	Lorain High School	6 ft 1 in (1.85 m)	185 lb (84 kg)	Aug 31, 2019
Seth Wilson #28 PG	Recruit ratings: Rivals: 247Sports: ESPN: (80)				
Kobe Johnson #33 PG	Canton, OH	McKinley High School	6 ft 3 in (1.91 m)	190 lb (86 kg)	Aug 31, 2019
Kobe Johnson #33 PG	Recruit ratings: Rivals: 247Sports: ESPN: (79)				
Jamel King #40 SF	Uniontown, AL	Bella Vista College Prep	6 ft 7 in (2.01 m)	190 lb (86 kg)	Jun 24, 2021
Jamel King #40 SF	Recruit ratings: Rivals: 247Sports: ESPN: (77)				
James Okonkwo #41 C	Maidenhead, England	Beckley Prep	6 ft 8 in (2.03 m)	210 lb (95 kg)	Jun 24, 2021
James Okonkwo #41 C	Recruit ratings: Rivals: 247Sports: ESPN: (75)				
Overall recruit ranking:
Note: In many cases, Scout, Rivals, 247Sports, On3, and ESPN may conflict in their listings of height and weight.; In these cases, the average was taken. ESPN grades are on a 100-point scale.; Sources: "2021 Team Ranking". Rivals.

==== 2022 recruiting class ====
College recruiting information (2022)
Name	Hometown	School	Height	Weight	Commit date
Josiah Harris #21 PF	Cleveland, OH	Richmond Heights High School	6 ft 6 in (1.98 m)	185 lb (84 kg)	Mar 31, 2021
Josiah Harris #21 PF	Recruit ratings: Rivals: 247Sports: ESPN: (81)				
Josiah Davis #34 PG	Kitchener, ON	Teays Valley Christian School	6 ft 3 in (1.91 m)	170 lb (77 kg)	Feb 22, 2021
Josiah Davis #34 PG	Recruit ratings: Rivals: 247Sports: ESPN: (80)				
Overall recruit ranking:
Note: In many cases, Scout, Rivals, 247Sports, On3, and ESPN may conflict in their listings of height and weight.; In these cases, the average was taken. ESPN grades are on a 100-point scale.; Sources: "2022 Team Ranking". Rivals.

== Roster ==
2021–22 West Virginia Mountaineers men's basketball team
Players
Coaches

Pos.	#	Name	Height	Weight	Year	Previous school	Hometown
G	0	Kedrian Johnson	6 ft 3 in (1.91 m)	185 lb (84 kg)	Sr	Temple College	Dallas, TX
F	1	Pauly Paulicap	6 ft 8 in (2.03 m)	235 lb (107 kg)	GS	DePaul	Elmont, NY
G	2	Kobe Johnson	6 ft 3 in (1.91 m)	210 lb (95 kg)	Fr	Canton HS	Canton, OH
F	3	Gabe Osabuohien	6 ft 7 in (2.01 m)	240 lb (109 kg)	GS	Arkansas	Toronto, ON
F	4	Jamel King	6 ft 7 in (2.01 m)	190 lb (86 kg)	Fr	Bella Vista Prep	Uniontown, AL
F	5	Dimon Carrigan	6 ft 9 in (2.06 m)	230 lb (104 kg)	GS	FIU	Boston, MA
G	10	Malik Curry	6 ft 1 in (1.85 m)	190 lb (86 kg)	GS	Old Dominion	Wilmington, DE
F	11	Jalen Bridges	6 ft 7 in (2.01 m)	225 lb (102 kg)	RS So	Fairmont Senior HS	Fairmont, WV
G	12	Taz Sherman	6 ft 4 in (1.93 m)	190 lb (86 kg)	GS	Collin College	Missouri City, TX
F	13	Isaiah Cottrell	6 ft 10 in (2.08 m)	245 lb (111 kg)	RS Fr	Huntington Prep	Las Vegas, NV
G	22	Sean McNeil	6 ft 3 in (1.91 m)	205 lb (93 kg)	Sr	Sinclair CC	Union, KY
F	23	Seny N'diaye	6 ft 10 in (2.08 m)	245 lb (111 kg)	So	Huntington Prep	Dakar, Senegal
F	24	Taj Thweatt	6 ft 7 in (2.01 m)	210 lb (95 kg)	So	Wildwood Catholic	Wildwood, NJ
G	30	Spencer Macke (W)	5 ft 11 in (1.8 m)	175 lb (79 kg)	Jr	Silver Grove HS	Fort Thomas, KY
F	32	James Okonkwo	6 ft 8 in (2.03 m)	230 lb (104 kg)	Fr	Beckley Prep	Maidenhead, England
G	45	Seth Wilson	6 ft 1 in (1.85 m)	215 lb (98 kg)	Fr	Lorain HS	Lorain, OH

Head coach

- Bob Huggins (West Virginia)

Assistant coach(es)

- Larry Harrison (Pittsburgh)
- Ron Everhart (Virginia Tech)
- Erik Martin (Cincinnati)

Legend

- (C) Team captain
- (S) Suspended
- (I) Ineligible
- (W) Walk-on
- Injured
- Current redshirt

Roster

== Schedule and results ==
Date time, TV	Rank^{#}	Opponent^{#}	Result	Record	High points	High rebounds	High assists	Site (attendance) city, state
Exhibition
October 29, 2021*; 7:00 p.m., ESPN+		Akron; Charity Exhibition	W 74–59		29 – Sherman	6 – Carrigan	4 – Curry	WVU Coliseum (9,434); Morgantown, WV
Regular season
November 9, 2021*; 7:00 p.m., ESPN+		Oakland	W 60–53	1–0	18 – Sherman	9 – Osabuohien	5 – Sherman	WVU Coliseum (9,408); Morgantown, WV
November 12, 2021*; 8:30 p.m., ESPNU		Pittsburgh; Backyard Brawl	W 74–59	2–0	18 – Bridges	6 – Bridges	6 – Ke. Johnson	WVU Coliseum (14,100); Morgantown, WV
November 18, 2021*; 9:30 p.m., ESPN2		vs. Elon; Charleston Classic Quarterfinals	W 87–68	3–0	27 – Sherman	6 – Paulicap	5 – Sherman	TD Arena (4,213); Charleston, SC
November 19, 2021*; 7:00 p.m., ESPN2		vs. Marquette; Charleston Classic Semifinals	L 71–82	3–1	21 – Sherman	6 – Bridges	5 – Sherman	TD Arena; Charleston, SC
November 21, 2021*; 5:00 p.m., ESPN2		vs. Clemson; Charleston Classic Consolation – 3rd Place	W 66–59	4–1	15 – McNeil	7 – Osabuohien	4 – Osabuohien	TD Arena; Charleston, SC
November 26, 2021*; 7:00 p.m., ESPN+		Eastern Kentucky	W 80-77	5–1	28 – Sherman	7 – Osabuohien	3 – Sherman	WVU Coliseum (10,062); Morgantown, WV
November 30, 2021*; 7:00 p.m., ESPN+		Bellarmine	W 74–55	6–1	18 – Sherman	9 – Bridges	3 – Sherman	WVU Coliseum (9,523); Morgantown, WV
December 4, 2021*; 4:00 p.m., ESPN+		Radford	W 67–51	7–1	27 – Sherman	5 – Paulicap	3 – Curry	WVU Coliseum (11,014); Morgantown, WV
December 8, 2021*; 7:00 p.m., ESPN2		No. 15 UConn; Big East–Big 12 Battle	W 56–53	8–1	23 – Sherman	7 – Osabuohien	3 – Sherman	WVU Coliseum (12,045); Morgantown, WV
December 12, 2021*; 4:00 p.m., ESPN2		Kent State	W 63–50	9–1	27 – Sherman	6 – Bridges	3 – Sherman	WVU Coliseum (11,532); Morgantown, WV
December 18, 2021*; 5:00 p.m., CBSSN		at UAB	W 65–59	10–1	17 – Sherman	9 – Osabuohien	4 – Ke. Johnson	Legacy Arena (8,427); Birmingham, AL
December 22, 2021*; 6:00 p.m., ESPN+		Youngstown State	W 82–52	11–1	23 – McNeil	8 – Bridges	4 – Curry	WVU Coliseum (9,784); Morgantown, WV
January 1, 2022; 12:00 p.m., ESPNU		at No. 17 Texas	L 59–74	11–2 (0–1)	18 – Bridges	9 – Carrigan	4 – Johnson	Frank Erwin Center (12,864); Austin, TX
January 8, 2022; 2:00 p.m., ESPN+		Kansas State	W 71–68	12–2 (1–1)	26 – McNeil	12 – Osabuohien	3 – Ke. Johnson	WVU Coliseum (11,919); Morgantown, WV
January 11, 2022; 9:00 p.m., ESPN2		Oklahoma State	W 70–60	13–2 (2–1)	22 – Bridges	8 – Osabuohien	5 – Sherman	WVU Coliseum (10,352); Morgantown, WV
January 15, 2022; 2:00 p.m., CBS		at No. 9 Kansas	L 59–85	13–3 (2–2)	23 – Curry	11 – Bridges	2 – Curry	Allen Fieldhouse (16,300); Lawrence, KS
January 18, 2022; 5:00 p.m., ESPN2		No. 5 Baylor	L 68–77	13–4 (2–3)	18 – Sherman	6 – Tied	3 – Sherman	WVU Coliseum (12,692); Morgantown, WV
January 22, 2022; 12:00 p.m., ESPN2		at No. 18 Texas Tech	L 65–78	13–5 (2–4)	21 – Sherman	6 – Osabuohien	2 – Tied	United Supermarkets Arena (14,556); Lubbock, TX
January 26, 2022; 8:00 p.m., ESPN2		Oklahoma	L 62–72	13–6 (2–5)	17 – Osabuohien	6 – Bridges	2 – Tied	WVU Coliseum (10,997); Morgantown, WV
January 29, 2022*; 2:00 p.m., ESPN2		at Arkansas; Big 12/SEC Challenge	L 68–77	13–7	18 – Ke. Johnson	6 – Bridges	4 – McNeil	Bud Walton Arena (19,200); Fayetteville, AR
January 31, 2022; 9:00 p.m., ESPN		at No. 8 Baylor	L 77–81	13–8 (2–6)	29 – Sherman	5 – Tied	4 – Ke. Johnson	Ferrell Center (8,226); Waco, TX
February 5, 2022; 2:00 p.m., ESPN		No. 14 Texas Tech	L 53–60	13–9 (2–7)	16 – Bridges	13 – Osabuohien	3 – Osabuohien	WVU Coliseum (12,673); Morgantown, WV
February 8, 2022; 7:00 p.m., ESPN+		Iowa State	W 79–63	14–9 (3–7)	16 – Sherman	8 – Sherman	6 – Sherman	WVU Coliseum (11,191); Morgantown, WV
February 12, 2022; 2:00 p.m., ESPN2		at Oklahoma State	L 58–81	14–10 (3–8)	13 – Curry	4 – Osabuohien	3 – Osabuohien	Gallagher-Iba Arena (8,013); Stillwater, OK
February 14, 2022; 7:00 p.m., ESPN2		at Kansas State	L 73–78	14–11 (3–9)	23 – Sherman	10 – Bridges	4 – Johnson	Bramlage Coliseum (5,401); Manhattan, KS
February 19, 2022; 8:00 p.m., ESPN		No. 6 Kansas	L 58–71	14–12 (3–10)	18 – McNeil	6 – Osabuohien	3 – Sherman	WVU Coliseum (14,012); Morgantown, WV
February 21, 2022; 7:00 p.m., ESPN+		at TCU; Rescheduled from January 3	L 67–77	14–13 (3–11)	23 – Sherman	6 – Paulicap	4 – Johnson	Schollmaier Arena (5,374); Fort Worth, TX
February 23, 2022; 7:00 p.m., ESPNU		at Iowa State	L 81–84	14–14 (3–12)	19 – Curry	6 – Curry	3 – McNeil	Hilton Coliseum (12,810); Ames, IA
February 26, 2022; 2:00 p.m., ESPN2		No. 20 Texas	L 81–82	14–15 (3–13)	27 – Curry	6 – Cottrell	3 – Osabuohien	WVU Coliseum (13,470); Morgantown, WV
March 1, 2022; 7:00 p.m., ESPN2		at Oklahoma	L 59–72	14–16 (3–14)	17 – Curry	6 – Curry	4 – Curry	Lloyd Noble Center (7,259); Norman, OK
March 5, 2022; 2:00 p.m., ESPN+		TCU	W 70–64	15–16 (4–14)	25 – Sherman	10 – Osabuohien	4 – Sherman	WVU Coliseum (11,324); Morgantown, WV
Big 12 tournament
March 9, 2022; 6:00 p.m., ESPNU	(9)	vs. (8) Kansas State; First round	W 73–67	16–16	21 – McNeil	9 – Sherman	3 – Sherman	T-Mobile Center (15,295); Kansas City, MO
March 10, 2022; 2:00 p.m., ESPN	(9)	vs. (1) No. 6 Kansas; Quarterfinals	L 63–87	16–17	19 – Curry	5 – Paulicap	2 – Curry	T-Mobile Center (15,845); Kansas City, MO
*Non-conference game. ^{#}Rankings from AP Poll. (#) Tournament seedings in parentheses. All times are in Eastern Time.
