= Bryce Thompson (basketball) =

American basketball player (born 2002)

Free agent
- Position: Shooting guard

Personal information
- Born: February 26, 2002 (age 24)
- Listed height: 6 ft 6 in (1.98 m)
- Listed weight: 194 lb (88 kg)

Career information
- High school: Booker T. Washington (Tulsa, Oklahoma)
- College: Kansas (2020–2021); Oklahoma State (2021–2025)
- NBA draft: 2025: undrafted
- Playing career: 2025–present

Career history
- 2025: Valley Suns
- 2025: Austin Spurs
- 2026: Oklahoma City Blue

Career highlights
- McDonald's All-American (2020)

Bryce Joseph Thompson (born February 26, 2002) is an American professional basketball player who last played for the Oklahoma City Blue of the NBA G League. He played college basketball for the Kansas Jayhawks and the Oklahoma State Cowboys. He was a consensus five-star recruit and one of the best shooting guards in the 2020 class.

== High school career ==
Thompson attended Booker T. Washington High School in Tulsa, Oklahoma and was coached by Conley Phipps. He led the team to two state runner-up finishes during his freshman and sophomore seasons. As a junior, Thompson led the Hornets to an Oklahoma State title and was named Gatorade Player of the Year. In the 2019 Under Armour Circuit, Thompson averaged 25.3 points per game for Oklahoma Run PWP. As a senior, Thompson averaged 25.1 points, 5.8 rebounds and 2.8 assists per game. He was named Oklahoma Gatorade Player of the Year for the second straight season and was also named a McDonald's All-American. Thompson finished his high school career with 1,945 points.

=== Recruiting ===
Thompson was ranked the 20th best prospect and top prospect in Oklahoma in his class by 247Sports. He committed to playing college basketball for Kansas on November 12, 2019, choosing the Jayhawks over offers from Oklahoma State, Oklahoma, and North Carolina. Thompson chose Kansas due to the history of winning and his relationship with coach Bill Self.

College recruiting
Name	Hometown	School	Height	Weight	Commit date
Bryce Thompson; SG	Tulsa, OK	Booker T. Washington (OK)	6 ft 5 in (1.96 m)	175 lb (79 kg)	Nov 12, 2019
Bryce Thompson; SG	Recruit ratings: Rivals: 247Sports: ESPN: (90)				
Overall recruit ranking: Rivals: 21 247Sports: 20 ESPN: 29
Note: In many cases, Scout, Rivals, 247Sports, On3, and ESPN may conflict in their listings of height and weight.; In these cases, the average was taken. ESPN grades are on a 100-point scale.; Sources: "Kansas 2020 Basketball Commitments". Rivals.; "2020 Kansas Jayhawks Recruiting Class". ESPN.; "2020 Team Ranking". Rivals.

== College career ==
Thompson missed 10 games during his freshman season due to a back injury and broken right index finger. He averaged 4.6 points, 1.5 rebounds and 1.1 assists per game. Following the season he transferred to Oklahoma State.

== Professional career ==
After going undrafted in the 2025 NBA draft, Thompson was selected by the Valley Suns in the 2025 NBA G League Draft.

== Career statistics ==
Legend
GP	Games played	GS	Games started	MPG	Minutes per game
FG%	Field goal percentage	3P%	3-point field goal percentage	FT%	Free throw percentage
RPG	Rebounds per game	APG	Assists per game	SPG	Steals per game
BPG	Blocks per game	PPG	Points per game	**Bold**	Career high

=== College ===
Year	Team	GP	GS	MPG	FG%	3P%	FT%	RPG	APG	SPG	BPG	PPG
2020–21	Kansas	20	4	17.1	.353	.222	.647	1.5	1.1	.4	**.2**	4.6
2021–22	Oklahoma State	29	25	26.1	.413	.290	.667	2.3	1.1	.6	.1	10.6
2022–23	Oklahoma State	**36**	**36**	**30.5**	.392	**.370**	.547	2.6	**2.6**	.6	.1	11.8
2023–24	Oklahoma State	18	17	27.8	.394	.344	.673	1.9	1.5	.8	.1	11.6
2024–25	Oklahoma State	35	35	26.9	**.440**	.340	**.782**	**2.7**	1.7	**1.0**	.1	**13.0**
Career		138	117	26.4	.407	.332	.683	2.3	1.7	.7	.1	10.8

== Personal life ==
Thompson's father Rod played basketball at Tulsa in the 1990s. His maternal grandfather Marshall Rogers played at Kansas during the 1972–73 season before transferring to Texas–Pan American. Oklahoma assistant coach Pooh Williamson is a family friend. Thompson speaks fluent French.
