= 2022–23 Texas Longhorns men's basketball team =

American college basketball season

2022–23 Texas Longhorns men's basketball

Big 12 tournament champions

NCAA tournament, Elite Eight
- Conference: Big 12 Conference

Ranking
- Coaches: No. 7
- AP: No. 5
- Record: 29–9 (12–6 Big 12)
- Head coach: Chris Beard (2nd season; first eight games); Rodney Terry (interim)
- Assistant coaches: Brandon Chappell (1st season); Bob Donewald Jr. (2nd season)
- Home arena: Moody Center

2022–23 Big 12 men's basketball standings
| | Conf. | | | | Overall |
| Team | W | | L | PCT | W | | L | PCT |
|---|---|---|---|---|---|---|---|---|
| No. 4 Kansas | 13 | – | 5 | .722 | 28 | – | 8 | .778 |
| No. 5 Texas † | 12 | – | 6 | .667 | 29 | – | 9 | .763 |
| No. 15 Kansas State | 11 | – | 7 | .611 | 26 | – | 10 | .722 |
| No. 11 Baylor | 11 | – | 7 | .611 | 23 | – | 11 | .676 |
| Iowa State | 9 | – | 9 | .500 | 19 | – | 14 | .576 |
| No. 22 TCU | 9 | – | 9 | .500 | 22 | – | 13 | .629 |
| Oklahoma State | 8 | – | 10 | .444 | 20 | – | 16 | .556 |
| West Virginia | 7 | – | 11 | .389 | 19 | – | 15 | .559 |
| Texas Tech | 5 | – | 13 | .278 | 16 | – | 16 | .500 |
| Oklahoma | 5 | – | 13 | .278 | 15 | – | 17 | .469 |
† 2023 Big 12 tournament winner Rankings from AP poll

The 2022–23 Texas Longhorns men's basketball team represented the University of Texas at Austin in the 2022–23 NCAA Division I men's basketball season. They were led by interim head coach Rodney Terry and played their home games at the Moody Center in Austin, Texas as members of the Big 12 Conference. The Longhorns played at the newly-built Moody Center after playing at Frank Erwin Center for 45 years. They finished the season 23–8, 12–6 in Big 12 play to finish in second place. As the No. 2 seed in the Big 12 tournament, they defeated Oklahoma State, TCU, and top-seeded Kansas to win the tournament. They received an automatic bid to the NCAA tournament as the No. 2 seed in the Midwest Region, where they defeated Colgate, Penn State, and Xavier to reach the Elite Eight, their first appearance since 2008. There, the Longhorns finally fell to Miami (FL), bringing their season to a close with a final record of 29–9.

On December 12, 2022, head coach Chris Beard was suspended without pay after an early morning arrest for third-degree felony domestic assault on his fiancée. Associate head coach Rodney Terry began serving as acting head coach starting with the December 12th game versus Rice.

On January 5, 2023, Beard was officially terminated by Texas athletic director Chris Del Conte; Terry continued as acting head coach for the remainder of the season. On March 27, 2023, Terry was named the permanent full-time head coach for the Longhorns following their impressive run to the Elite Eight in the 2023 NCAA tournament.

== Previous season ==
=== Season outlook ===
Heading into the 2021–22 season, there was a lot of excitement surrounding the program after the hiring of former Texas Tech head coach Chris Beard. Texas came into the season ranked number 5 in both the AP Preseason Poll and the USA Today Coaches Poll, further invigorating the hype. Also, there was a lot of roster turnover heading into the season with Beard landing 6 of the top 31 transfers in the transfer portal, and only 1 high school recruit in Jaylon Tyson. In Beard's inaugural season, The Longhorns finished the 2021–22 season at 21–11. During the regular season, Texas finished with a record of 21–10, 10–8 in conference play, and 11–2 in non-conference play. Furthermore, the Longhorns were 3–8 against top-25 competition. Texas went 16–3 at home, 4–7 on the road, and 1–1 at neutral sites. This was the Longhorns first 20-win season since the 2018-19 season, they went 21–16 that year. However, the season did have its ups and downs. Additionally, Jaylon Tyson and Tre Mitchell suddenly departed the team mid-season, and Texas lost their last 2 games of the regular season with an early exit in the Big 12 tournament, being eliminated in the first round by TCU 60–65.

=== Big 12 tournament ===
Texas entered the Big 12 tournament as a 4-seed. They faced off against 5-seed TCU where they were defeated 60–65, giving them a 6-seed heading into the 2022 NCAA Division I men's basketball tournament.

=== NCAA tournament ===
Texas entered the NCAA tournament as a 6-seed, facing off against 11-seed Virginia Tech. Against Virginia Tech, Texas won 81–73. Furthermore, Texas's victory against Virginia Tech marked their first win in the NCAA tournament since 2014. In the round of 32, Texas faced off against 3-seed Purdue losing 71–81, ending their season.

== Offseason ==
=== Returning players ===
Texas Returners
| Name | Number | Pos. | Height | Weight | Year | Hometown |
|---|---|---|---|---|---|---|
| Timmy Allen | 0 | F | 6’6” | 210 lbs | (redshirt) Senior | Mesa, AZ |
| Marcus Carr | 2 | G | 6’2” | 190 lbs | (redshirt) Senior | Toronto, ON |
| Dylan Disu | 4 | F | 6’9” | 225 lbs | Senior | Pflugerville, TX |
| Cole Bott | 10 | F | 6’6” | 195 lbs | Sophomore | Highlands Ranch, CO |
| Brock Cunningham | 30 | F | 6’6” | 210 lbs | Senior | Austin, TX |
| Gavin Perryman | 31 | G | 6’1” | 185 lbs | Sophomore | Dallas, TX |
| Christian Bishop | 32 | F | 6’7” | 220 lbs | (redshirt) Senior | Lee's Summit, MO |

=== Departures ===
Texas Departures
| Name | Number | Pos. | Height | Weight | Year | Hometown | Reason for Departures |
|---|---|---|---|---|---|---|---|
| Andrew Jones | 1 | G | 6’4” | 190 lbs | (redshirt) Senior | Irving, TX | Completed college eligibility |
| Courtney Ramey | 3 | G | 6’3” | 185 lbs | Senior | St. Louis, MO | Transferred to Arizona |
| Devin Askew | 5 | G | 6’3” | 195 lbs | Sophomore | Sacramento, CA | Transferred to California |
| Tristen Licon | 12 | G | 6’0” | 185 lbs | Graduate Student | El Paso, TX | Completed college eligibility |
| Jase Febres | 13 | G | 6’5” | 190 lbs | Graduate Student | Houston, TX | Completed college eligibility |
| Jaylon Tyson | 20 | G/F | 6’7” | 210 lbs | Freshman | Plano, TX | Transferred to Texas Tech |
| Avery Benson | 21 | G | 6’4” | 195 lbs | (redshirt) Senior | Springdale, AR | Completed college eligibility |
| Tre Mitchell | 33 | F | 6’9” | 220 lbs | Junior | Pittsburgh, PA | Transferred to West Virginia |

==== Outgoing transfers ====
Texas outgoing transfers
| Name | Number | Pos. | Height | Weight | Year | Hometown | New School | Source |
|---|---|---|---|---|---|---|---|---|
| Courtney Ramey | 3 | G | 6’3” | 185 lbs | Senior | St. Louis, MO | Arizona | |
| Devin Askew | 5 | G | 6’3” | 195 lbs | Sophomore | Sacramento, CA | California | |
| Jaylon Tyson | 20 | G/F | 6’7” | 210 lbs | Freshman | Plano, TX | Texas Tech | |
| Tre Mitchell | 33 | F | 6’9” | 220 lbs | Junior | Pittsburgh, PA | West Virginia | |

==== Coaching staff departures ====
| Name | Position | New Team | New Position | Source |
|---|---|---|---|---|
| Ulric Maligi | Assistant coach | Kansas State | Associate head coach | |
| Jerrance Howard | Assistant coach | (Note: Howard resigned from Texas and isn’t coaching collegiate basketball for the 2022-23 season. Howard was replaced by Texas special assistant to the head coach Bob Donewald Jr.) | | |

=== Acquisitions ===
==== Incoming transfers ====
Texas incoming transfers
| Name | Number | Pos. | Height | Weight | Year | Hometown | Previous school | Source |
|---|---|---|---|---|---|---|---|---|
| Tyrese Hunter | 4 | G | 6’0” | 175 lbs | Sophomore | Racine, WI | Iowa State | |
| Sir'Jabari Rice | 10 | G | 6’4” | 180 lbs | Graduate Student | Houston, TX | New Mexico State | |

==== 2022 recruiting class ====
College recruiting information (2022)
| Name | Hometown | School | Height | Weight | Commit date |
|---|---|---|---|---|---|
| Arterio Morris; PG | Dallas, TX | Justin F. Kimball High School | 6 ft 3 in (1.91 m) | 190 lb (86 kg) | Jul 17, 2021 |
| Arterio Morris; PG | Recruit ratings: Rivals: 247Sports: ESPN: (91) | | | | |
| Dillon Mitchell; SF | Spring Hill, FL | Montverde Academy | 6 ft 7 in (2.01 m) | 180 lb (82 kg) | Oct 25, 2021 |
| Dillon Mitchell; SF | Recruit ratings: Rivals: 247Sports: ESPN: (94) | | | | |
| Rowan Brumbaugh; PG | Washington, DC | Northfield Mount Hermon School | 6 ft 4 in (1.93 m) | 180 lb (82 kg) | Dec 30, 2021 |
| Rowan Brumbaugh; PG | Recruit ratings: Rivals: 247Sports: ESPN: (82) | | | | |
| Alex Anamekwe; PF | McKinney, TX | McKinney High School | 6 ft 6 in (1.98 m) | 195 lb (88 kg) | May 5, 2022 |
| Alex Anamekwe; PF | Recruit ratings: Rivals: 247Sports: ESPN: (79) | | | | |
Overall recruit ranking: Rivals: 5 247Sports: 3 ESPN: 7
Note: In many cases, Scout, Rivals, 247Sports, On3, and ESPN may conflict in their listings of height and weight.; In these cases, the average was taken. ESPN grades are on a 100-point scale.; Sources: "Texas 2022 Basketball Commitments". Rivals.; "2022 Texas Longhorns Recruiting Class". ESPN.; "2022 Team Ranking". Rivals.

==== 2023 recruiting class ====
College recruiting information (2023)
| Name | Hometown | School | Height | Weight | Commit date |
|---|---|---|---|---|---|
| Chris Johnson; PG | Missouri City, TX | Montverde Academy | 6 ft 4 in (1.93 m) | 180 lb (82 kg) | Jun 26, 2023 |
| Chris Johnson; PG | Recruit ratings: Rivals: 247Sports: ESPN: (87) | | | | |
| Devon Pryor; F | Houston, TX | PSAT Academy | 6 ft 7 in (2.01 m) | 180 lb (82 kg) | Jul 10, 2023 |
| Devon Pryor; F | Recruit ratings: Rivals: 247Sports: ESPN: (N/A) | | | | |
Overall recruit ranking: Rivals: — 247Sports: 29 ESPN: —
Note: In many cases, Scout, Rivals, 247Sports, On3, and ESPN may conflict in their listings of height and weight.; In these cases, the average was taken. ESPN grades are on a 100-point scale.; Sources: "Texas 2023 Basketball Commitments". Rivals.; "2023 Texas Longhorns Recruiting Class". ESPN.; "2023 Team Ranking". Rivals.

=== Coaching staff additions ===
| Name | Position | Previous Team | Previous Position | Source |
|---|---|---|---|---|
| Brandon Chappell | Assistant coach | UNLV | Assistant coach | |
| Steve McClain | Special Assistant to the head coach | Georgia | Assistant coach | |

== Preseason ==
=== Award watch lists ===
Listed in the order that they were released

| Award | Player | Position | Year | Source |
|---|---|---|---|---|
| Bob Cousy Award | Tyrese Hunter | G | Sophomore | |
| Wooden Award | Tyrese Hunter | G | Sophomore | |
| Wooden Award | Timmy Allen | F | Senior | |

=== Big 12 media poll ===
Big 12 media poll
| Predicted finish | Team | Votes (1st place) |
| 1 | Baylor | 77 (5) |
| 2 | Kansas | 73 (4) |
| 3 | Texas | 64 (1) |
| 4 | TCU | 58 |
| T-5 | Oklahoma State | 42 |
| T-5 | Texas Tech | 42 |
| 7 | Oklahoma | 32 |
| 8 | Iowa State | 30 |
| 9 | West Virginia | 20 |
| 10 | Kansas State | 12 |

=== Preseason All-Big 12 teams ===
| Position | Player | Class |
|---|---|---|
First Team
| F | Timmy Allen | Senior |
| G | Marcus Carr | Graduate Student |
Honorable Mention
| G | Tyrese Hunter | Sophomore |

== Roster ==
2022–23 Texas Longhorns men's basketball team
Players
Coaches

| Pos. | # | Name | Height | Weight | Year | Previous school | Hometown |
|---|---|---|---|---|---|---|---|
| F | 0 | Timmy Allen | 6 ft 6 in (1.98 m) | 210 lb (95 kg) | Sr | Red Mountain; Utah | Mesa, AZ |
| F | 1 | Dylan Disu | 6 ft 9 in (2.06 m) | 225 lb (102 kg) | Sr | Hendrickson; Vanderbilt | Pflugerville, TX |
| G | 2 | Arterio Morris | 6 ft 3 in (1.91 m) | 190 lb (86 kg) | Fr | Justin F. Kimball High School | Dallas, TX |
| G | 3 | Rowan Brumbaugh | 6 ft 4 in (1.93 m) | 190 lb (86 kg) | Fr | Northfield Mount Hermon School | Washington, DC |
| G | 4 | Tyrese Hunter | 6 ft 0 in (1.83 m) | 175 lb (79 kg) | So | St. Catherine's; Iowa State | Racine, WI |
| G | 5 | Marcus Carr | 6 ft 2 in (1.88 m) | 175 lb (79 kg) | GS | Montverde Academy; Minnesota | Toronto, ON |
| G | 10 | Sir'Jabari Rice | 6 ft 4 in (1.93 m) | 180 lb (82 kg) | GS | Thurgood Marshall High School; New Mexico State | Houston, TX |
| F | 12 | Cole Bott (W) | 6 ft 6 in (1.98 m) | 195 lb (88 kg) | RS Fr | Northfield Mount Hermon School | Highlands Ranch, CO |
| G | 13 | Gavin Perryman (W) | 6 ft 1 in (1.85 m) | 185 lb (84 kg) | RS Fr | Dallas Jesuit | Dallas, TX |
| F | 14 | Alex Anamekwe | 6 ft 5 in (1.96 m) | 200 lb (91 kg) | Fr | McKinney High School | McKinney, TX |
| F | 20 | Preston Clark (W) | 6 ft 6 in (1.98 m) | 210 lb (95 kg) | Fr | Westlake | Austin, TX |
| F | 23 | Dillon Mitchell | 6 ft 8 in (2.03 m) | 205 lb (93 kg) | Fr | Montverde Academy | Tampa, FL |
| F | 30 | Brock Cunningham | 6 ft 6 in (1.98 m) | 210 lb (95 kg) | GS | Westlake | Austin, TX |
| F | 32 | Christian Bishop | 6 ft 7 in (2.01 m) | 220 lb (100 kg) | Sr | West; Creighton | Lee's Summit, MO |

Head coach

- Chris Beard (Texas) (first 8 games)
- Rodney Terry (St. Edward's) (Interim)

Assistant coach(es)

- Rodney Terry (St. Edward's)
- Brandon Chappell (Lamar)
- Bob Donewald Jr. (Western Michigan)

Legend

- (C) Team captain
- (S) Suspended
- (I) Ineligible
- (W) Walk-on
- Injured
- Current redshirt

=== Roster outlook ===
| Senior | Junior | Sophomore | Freshman |
|---|---|---|---|
| Brock Cunningham — F Christian Bishop — F Dylan Disu — F Marcus Carr — G Sir’Jabari Rice — G Timmy Allen — F | No juniors on roster | Tyrese Hunter — G | Alex Anamekwe — F Arterio Morris — G Cole Bott* — F Dillon Mitchell — F Gavin Perryman* — G Preston Clark — F Rowan Brumbaugh — G |

(*)Redshirt

== Schedule and results ==
| Date time, TV | Rank^{#} | Opponent^{#} | Result | Record | High points | High rebounds | High assists | Site (attendance) city, state |
Exhibition
| October 29, 2022*; 3:00 p.m. | No. 12 | No. 10 Arkansas; Charity Exhibition | W 90–60 | 0–0 | 19 – Morris | 5 – Tied | 5 – Allen | Moody Center (7,271); Austin, TX |
Regular Season
| November 7, 2022*; 8:00 p.m., LHN | No. 12 | UTEP | W 72–57 | 1–0 | 18 – Hunter | 6 – Rice | 6 – Carr | Moody Center (11,313); Austin, TX |
| November 10, 2022*; 8:00 p.m., LHN | No. 12 | Houston Christian | W 82–31 | 2–0 | 11 – Tied | 12 – Mitchell | 3 – Tied | Moody Center (10,763); Austin, TX |
| November 16, 2022*; 8:30 p.m., ESPN2 | No. 11 | No. 2 Gonzaga | W 93–74 | 3–0 | 26 – Hunter | 9 – Mitchell | 7 – Carr | Moody Center (11,313); Austin, TX |
| November 21, 2022*; 7:30 p.m., LHN | No. 4 | vs. Northern Arizona; Leon Black Classic | W 73–48 | 4–0 | 17 – Carr | 10 – Allen | 5 – Rice | Bert Ogden Arena (6,674); Edinburg, TX |
| November 26, 2022*; 3:00 p.m., LHN | No. 4 | UTRGV; Leon Black Classic | W 91–54 | 5–0 | 19 – Rice | 10 – Disu | 5 – Rice | Gregory Gymnasium (3,500); Austin, TX |
| December 1, 2022*; 6:00 p.m., ESPN | No. 2 | No. 7 Creighton; Big East–Big 12 Battle | W 72–67 | 6–0 | 19 – Carr | 7 – Allen | 5 – Carr | Moody Center (10,896); Austin, TX |
| December 6, 2022*; 6:00 p.m., ESPN | No. 2 | vs. No. 17 Illinois; Jimmy V Classic | L 78–85 ^{OT} | 6–1 | 21 – Allen | 7 – Tied | 8 – Allen | Madison Square Garden (17,828); New York, NY |
| December 10, 2022*; 12:00 p.m., LHN | No. 2 | Arkansas–Pine Bluff; Jimmy Blacklock Classic | W 88–43 | 7–1 | 16 – Bishop | 9 – Bishop | 6 – Allen | Moody Center (10,673); Austin, TX |
| December 12, 2022*; 7:00 p.m., LHN | No. 7 | Rice | W 87–81 ^{OT} | 8–1 | 28 – Carr | 10 – Cunningham | 4 – Rice | Moody Center (10,763); Austin, TX |
| December 18, 2022*; 12:00 p.m., ESPN2 | No. 7 | vs. Stanford; Pac-12 Coast-to-Coast Challenge | W 72–62 | 9–1 | 17 – Carr | 5 – Disu | 5 – Tied | American Airlines Center (4,700); Dallas, TX |
| December 21, 2022*; 7:00 p.m., LHN | No. 7 | Louisiana | W 100–72 | 10–1 | 25 – Morris | 8 – Bishop | 4 – Tied | Moody Center (10,763); Austin, TX |
| December 27, 2022*; 7:00 p.m., LHN | No. 6 | Texas A&M–Commerce | W 97–72 | 11–1 | 41 – Carr | 6 – Allen | 8 – Tied | Moody Center (10,763); Austin, TX |
| December 31, 2022; 1:00 p.m., ESPN+ | No. 6 | at Oklahoma | W 70–69 | 12–1 (1–0) | 13 – Tied | 7 – Tied | 2 – Tied | Lloyd Noble Center (10,009); Norman, OK |
| January 3, 2023; 8:00 p.m., LHN | No. 6 | Kansas State | L 103–116 | 12–2 (1–1) | 29 – Hunter | 6 – Tied | 6 – Carr | Moody Center (10,763); Austin, TX |
| January 7, 2023; 11:00 a.m., ESPNU | No. 6 | at Oklahoma State | W 56–46 | 13–2 (2–1) | 12 – Carr | 12 – Mitchell | 4 – Carr | Gallagher-Iba Arena (7,368); Stillwater, OK |
| January 11, 2023; 8:00 p.m., ESPN2 | No. 10 | No. 17 TCU | W 79–75 | 14–2 (3–1) | 17 – Allen | 6 – Tied | 7 – Carr | Moody Center (11,313); Austin, TX |
| January 14, 2023; 7:00 p.m., ESPN | No. 10 | Texas Tech | W 72–70 | 15–2 (4–1) | 20 – Carr | 6 – Tied | 4 – Rice | Moody Center (11,313); Austin, TX |
| January 17, 2023; 7:00 p.m., ESPN+ | No. 7 | at No. 12 Iowa State | L 67–78 | 15–3 (4–2) | 12 – Bishop | 6 – Allen | 4 – Carr | Hilton Coliseum (14,267); Ames, IA |
| January 21, 2023; 5:00 p.m., ESPN | No. 7 | at West Virginia | W 69–61 | 16–3 (5–2) | 23 – Carr | 7 – Bishop | 4 – Hunter | WVU Coliseum (14,141); Morgantown, WV |
| January 24, 2023; 8:00 p.m., LHN | No. 10 | Oklahoma State | W 89–75 | 17–3 (6–2) | 21 – Carr | 8 – Disu | 5 – Carr | Moody Center (10,763); Austin, TX |
| January 28, 2023*; 5:00 p.m., ESPN | No. 10 | at No. 4 Tennessee; Big 12/SEC Challenge; College GameDay | L 71–82 | 17–4 | 21 – Rice | 5 – Bishop | 4 – Tied | Thompson–Boling Arena (21,678); Knoxville, TN |
| January 30, 2023; 8:00 p.m., ESPN | No. 10 | No. 11 Baylor | W 76–71 | 18–4 (7–2) | 21 – Rice | 7 – Mitchell | 4 – Allen | Moody Center (10,763); Austin, TX |
| February 4, 2023; 3:00 p.m., ESPN2 | No. 10 | at No. 7 Kansas State | W 69–66 | 19–4 (8–2) | 14 – Tied | 10 – Rice | 4 – Tied | Bramlage Coliseum (11,000); Manhattan, KS |
| February 6, 2023; 8:00 p.m., ESPN | No. 5 | at No. 9 Kansas | L 80–88 | 19–5 (8–3) | 29 – Carr | 9 – Mitchell | 2 – Tied | Allen Fieldhouse (16,300); Lawrence, KS |
| February 11, 2023; 11:00 a.m., ESPN2 | No. 5 | West Virginia | W 94–60 | 20–5 (9–3) | 24 – Rice | 9 – Allen | 4 – Tied | Moody Center (10,763); Austin, TX |
| February 13, 2023; 8:00 p.m., ESPN | No. 6 | at Texas Tech | L 67–74 | 20–6 (9–4) | 23 – Carr | 9 – Disu | 6 – Carr | United Supermarkets Arena (14,241); Lubbock, TX |
| February 18, 2023; 1:00 p.m., ESPN+ | No. 6 | Oklahoma | W 85–83 ^{OT} | 21–6 (10–4) | 24 – Rice | 9 – Allen | 4 – Tied | Moody Center (10,763); Austin, TX |
| February 21, 2023; 8:00 p.m., LHN | No. 8 | No. 23 Iowa State | W 72–54 | 22–6 (11–4) | 15 – Tied | 8 – Allen | 5 – Carr | Moody Center (11,313); Austin, TX |
| February 25, 2023; 1:00 p.m., ESPN | No. 8 | at No. 9 Baylor | L 72–81 | 22–7 (11–5) | 24 – Disu | 9 – Allen | 6 – Carr | Ferrell Center (10,499); Waco, TX |
| March 1, 2023; 8:00 p.m., ESPN2 | No. 9 | at No. 22 TCU | L 73–75 | 22–8 (11–6) | 16 – Rice | 5 – Tied | 6 – Allen | Schollmaier Arena (8,194); Fort Worth, TX |
| March 4, 2023; 3:00 p.m., ESPN | No. 9 | No. 3 Kansas | W 75–59 | 23–8 (12–6) | 23 – Rice | 7 – Rice | 6 – Carr | Moody Center (11,313); Austin, TX |
Big 12 Tournament
| March 9, 2023; 6:00 p.m., ESPN2 | (2) No. 7 | vs. (7) Oklahoma State; Quarterfinals | W 61–47 | 24–8 | 15 – Rice | 11 – Disu | 3 – Tied | T-Mobile Center (17,476); Kansas City, MO |
| March 10, 2023; 8:30 p.m., ESPN | (2) No. 7 | vs. (6) No. 22 TCU; Semifinals | W 66–60 | 25–8 | 15 – Tied | 8 – Disu | 3 – Tied | T-Mobile Center (19,135); Kansas City, MO |
| March 11, 2023; 5:00 p.m., ESPN | (2) No. 7 | vs. (1) No. 3 Kansas; Championship | W 76–56 | 26–8 | 18 – Disu | 9 – Cunningham | 3 – Tied | T-Mobile Center (17,763); Kansas City, MO |
NCAA Tournament
| March 16, 2023*; 6:25 p.m., TBS | (2 MW) No. 5 | vs. (15 MW) Colgate; First Round | W 81–61 | 27–8 | 23 – Rice | 9 – Disu | 5 – Allen | Wells Fargo Arena (16,728); Des Moines, IA |
| March 18, 2023*; 6:45 p.m., CBS | (2 MW) No. 5 | vs. (10 MW) Penn State; Second Round | W 71–66 | 28–8 | 28 – Disu | 11 – Allen | 3 – Tied | Wells Fargo Arena (16,796); Des Moines, IA |
| March 24, 2023*; 8:45 p.m., CBS | (2 MW) No. 5 | vs. (3 MW) No. 13 Xavier; Sweet Sixteen | W 83–71 | 29–8 | 19 – Hunter | 9 – Bishop | 6 – Carr | T-Mobile Center (17,429); Kansas City, MO |
| March 26, 2023*; 4:05 p.m., CBS | (2 MW) No. 5 | vs. (5 MW) No. 16 Miami (FL); Elite Eight | L 81–88 | 29–9 | 17 – Carr | 8 – Cunningham | 6 – Carr | T-Mobile Center (17,530); Kansas City, MO |
*Non-conference game. ^{#}Rankings from AP Poll. (#) Tournament seedings in parentheses. All times are in Central Time.

== Awards and honors ==
Weekly honors
| Honors | Player | Position | Date Awarded | Ref. |
|---|---|---|---|---|
| Big 12 Player of the Week | Marcus Carr | G | December 19, 2022 | |
| Big 12 Player of the Week | Marcus Carr | G | January 2, 2023 | |
| Big 12 Newcomer of the Week | Sir'Jabari Rice | G | January 16, 2023 | |
| Big 12 Newcomer of the Week | Sir'Jabari Rice | G | February 6, 2023 | |

Conference honors
| Honors | Player | Position |
|---|---|---|
| Big 12 Tournament Most Outstanding Player | Dylan Disu | F |
| Big 12 All-Tournament Team | Dylan Disu | F |
| Big 12 All-Tournament Team | Marcus Carr | G |
| Big 12 All-Tournament Team | Sir’Jabari Rice | G |
| Big 12 Sixth Man of the Year | Sir’Jabari Rice | G |
| All-Big 12 First Team | Marcus Carr | G |
| All-Big 12 Third Team | Sir’Jabari Rice | G |
| All-Big 12 Honorable Mention | Timmy Allen | F |
| Big 12 All-Newcomer Team | Sir’Jabari Rice | G |

National honors
| Honors | Player | Position | Ref. |
|---|---|---|---|
| Sporting News National Coach of the Year | Rodney Terry | Head coach | |

== Player statistics ==
Individual player statistics (Final)
| | | | Minutes | | Scoring | | Total FGs | | | 3-point FGs | | | Free-Throws | | | Rebounds | | | | | | | | |
| Player | GP | GS | Tot | Avg | Pts | Avg | FG | FGA | Pct | 3FG | 3FA | Pct | FT | FTA | Pct | Off | Def | Tot | Avg | A | PF | TO | Stl | Blk |
|---|---|---|---|---|---|---|---|---|---|---|---|---|---|---|---|---|---|---|---|---|---|---|---|---|
| Marcus Carr | 38 | 38 | 1268 | 33.9 | 603 | 15.9 | 208 | 486 | 42.8% | 82 | 223 | 36.8% | 105 | 136 | 77.2% | 11 | 102 | 113 | 3.0 | 157 | 78 | 59 | 62 | 2 |
| Sir'Jabari Rice | 38 | 3 | 962 | 25.3 | 494 | 13.0 | 159 | 343 | 46.4% | 63 | 170 | 37.1% | 113 | 131 | 86.3% | 27 | 106 | 133 | 3.5 | 77 | 77 | 58 | 34 | 13 |
| Timmy Allen | 35 | 35 | 992 | 28.4 | 367 | 10.5 | 138 | 284 | 48.6% | 3 | 20 | 15.0% | 88 | 128 | 68.8% | 45 | 151 | 196 | 5.6 | 122 | 89 | 74 | 32 | 17 |
| Tyrese Hunter | 38 | 38 | 1150 | 30.3 | 392 | 10.3 | 138 | 350 | 39.4% | 56 | 166 | 33.7% | 60 | 75 | 80.0% | 16 | 97 | 113 | 3.0 | 96 | 49 | 68 | 31 | 7 |
| Dylan Disu | 36 | 36 | 683 | 19.0 | 318 | 8.8 | 133 | 217 | 61.3% | 10 | 32 | 31.3% | 42 | 54 | 77.8% | 44 | 114 | 158 | 4.4 | 37 | 103 | 41 | 23 | 46 |
| Christian Bishop | 38 | 2 | 675 | 17.8 | 249 | 6.6 | 99 | 187 | 52.9% | 0 | 12 | 0.0% | 51 | 79 | 64.6% | 47 | 95 | 142 | 3.7 | 35 | 84 | 41 | 30 | 22 |
| Arterio Morris | 38 | 0 | 443 | 11.7 | 175 | 4.6 | 62 | 151 | 41.1% | 29 | 87 | 33.3% | 22 | 28 | 78.6% | 14 | 40 | 54 | 1.4 | 20 | 48 | 23 | 25 | 9 |
| Brock Cunningham | 38 | 0 | 694 | 18.3 | 173 | 4.6 | 60 | 126 | 47.6% | 26 | 63 | 41.3% | 27 | 31 | 87.1% | 66 | 65 | 131 | 3.4 | 53 | 84 | 24 | 33 | 7 |
| Dillon Mitchell | 38 | 38 | 664 | 17.5 | 165 | 4.3 | 75 | 118 | 63.6% | 0 | 0 | 0.0% | 15 | 37 | 40.5% | 52 | 96 | 148 | 3.9 | 14 | 43 | 21 | 23 | 12 |
| Alex Anamekwe | 12 | 0 | 59 | 5.0 | 18 | 1.5 | 8 | 14 | 57.1% | 2 | 4 | 50.0% | 0 | 0 | 0.0% | 3 | 5 | 8 | 0.7 | 1 | 5 | 4 | 2 | 0 |
| Cole Bott | 9 | 0 | 22 | 2.5 | 6 | 0.7 | 2 | 4 | 50.0% | 2 | 4 | 50.0% | 0 | 0 | 0.0% | 2 | 3 | 5 | 0.6 | 0 | 1 | 0 | 1 | 1 |
| Gavin Perryman | 11 | 0 | 38 | 3.5 | 3 | 0.3 | 1 | 9 | 11.1% | 1 | 9 | 11.1% | 0 | 0 | 0.0% | 1 | 4 | 5 | 0.5 | 2 | 2 | 2 | 3 | 0 |
| Total | 38 | – | 7675 | – | 2963 | 78.0 | 1083 | 2289 | 47.3% | 274 | 790 | 34.7% | 523 | 699 | 74.8% | 366 | 930 | 1296 | 34.1 | 614 | 663 | 439 | 299 | 136 |
| Opponents | 38 | – | 7675 | – | 2578 | 67.8 | 906 | 2132 | 42.5% | 240 | 741 | 32.4% | 526 | 719 | 73.2% | 380 | 927 | 1307 | 34.4 | 421 | 663 | 595 | 220 | 120 |

Legend
| GP | Games played | GS | Games started | Avg | Average per game |
| FG | Field-goals made | FGA | Field-goal attempts | Off | Offensive rebounds |
| Def | Defensive rebounds | A | Assists | TO | Turnovers |
| Blk | Blocks | Stl | Steals | High | Team high |

== Rankings ==
Ranking movements Legend: ██ Increase in ranking ██ Decrease in ranking т = Tied with team above or below ( ) = First-place votes
| | Week | | | | | | | | | | | | | | | | | | | |
| Poll | Pre | 1 | 2 | 3 | 4 | 5 | 6 | 7 | 8 | 9 | 10 | 11 | 12 | 13 | 14 | 15 | 16 | 17 | 18 | Final |
|---|---|---|---|---|---|---|---|---|---|---|---|---|---|---|---|---|---|---|---|---|
| AP | 12 | 11 | 4 (5) | 2 (8) | 2 (14) | 7 | 7 | 6 | 6 | 10 | 7 | 10 | 10 | 5 | 6 | 8 | 9 | 7 | 5 | Not released |
| Coaches | 12 | 11 | 4 (1) | 2 (5) | 2 (4) | 8 | 7 | 6 | 6 | 10 | 7 | 10 | 9т | 6 (1) | 5 | 8 | 7 | 7 | 7 | 7 |

*AP does not release post-NCAA Tournament rankings
