= 2023 Big 12 men's basketball tournament =

American college basketball competition

- Classification: Division I
- Season: 2022–23
- Teams: 10
- Site: T-Mobile Center; Kansas City, Missouri
- Champions: Texas (2nd title)
- Winning coach: Rodney Terry (1st title)
- MVP: Dylan Disu (Texas)
- Attendance: 90,110; 17,763 (championship)
- Top scorer: Jalen Wilson (Kansas) (71 points)
- Television: ESPN, ESPN2, ESPNU

The 2023 Big 12 Men's Basketball Tournament was a postseason men's basketball tournament for the Big 12 Conference. It was played from March 8 to 11 in Kansas City, Missouri at the T-Mobile Center. Texas won the tournament to earn the conference's automatic bid to the 2023 NCAA Tournament. The tournament was sponsored by Phillips 66.

2022–23 Big 12 men's basketball standings
	Conf.				Overall
Team	W		L	PCT	W		L	PCT
No. 4 Kansas	13	–	5	.722	28	–	8	.778
No. 5 Texas †	12	–	6	.667	29	–	9	.763
No. 15 Kansas State	11	–	7	.611	26	–	10	.722
No. 11 Baylor	11	–	7	.611	23	–	11	.676
Iowa State	9	–	9	.500	19	–	14	.576
No. 22 TCU	9	–	9	.500	22	–	13	.629
Oklahoma State	8	–	10	.444	20	–	16	.556
West Virginia	7	–	11	.389	19	–	15	.559
Texas Tech	5	–	13	.278	16	–	16	.500
Oklahoma	5	–	13	.278	15	–	17	.469
† 2023 Big 12 tournament winner Rankings from AP poll

== Seeds ==
All ten teams participated in the tournament. It was the final season with the 10-team bracket format, as the Big 12 expanded to 14 teams for the 2023–24 season before going to 16 in 2024–25. The top six teams received a first-round bye.

Teams were seeded by record within the conference, with a tiebreaker system to seed teams with identical conference records.

Seed	School	Conf	Tiebreaker 1	Tiebreaker 2	Tiebreaker 3
1	Kansas	13–5			
2	Texas	12–6			
3	Kansas State	11–7	2–0 vs. Baylor		
4	Baylor	11–7	0–2 vs. Kansas State		
5	Iowa State	9–9	2–0 vs. TCU		
6	TCU	9–9	0–2 vs. Iowa State		
7	Oklahoma State	8–10			
8	West Virginia	7–11			
9	Texas Tech	5–13	1–1 vs. Oklahoma	0–2 vs. Kansas	1–1 vs. Texas
10	Oklahoma	5–13	1–1 vs. Texas Tech	0–2 vs. Kansas	0–2 vs. Texas

== Schedule ==
Game	Time*	Matchup^{#}	Final score	Television†	Attendance
First round – Wednesday, March 8
1	6:00 p.m.	No. 8 West Virginia vs No. 9 Texas Tech	78–62	ESPNU	17,702
2	8:30 p.m.	No. 7 Oklahoma State vs No. 10 Oklahoma	57–49	ESPNU	17,702
Quarterfinals – Thursday, March 9
3	11:30 a.m.	No. 4 Baylor vs No. 5 Iowa State	72–78	ESPN	18,034
4	2:00 p.m.	No. 1 Kansas vs No. 8 West Virginia	78–61	ESPN	18,034
5	6:00 p.m.	No. 2 Texas vs No. 7 Oklahoma State	61–47	ESPN2	17,476
6	8:30 p.m.	No. 3 Kansas State vs No. 6 TCU	67–80	ESPN2	17,476
Semifinals – Friday, March 10
7	6:00 p.m.	No. 1 Kansas vs No. 5 Iowa State	71–58	ESPN	19,135
8	8:30 p.m.	No. 2 Texas vs No. 6 TCU	66–60	ESPN	19,135
Championship – Saturday, March 11
9	5:00 p.m.	No. 1 Kansas vs No. 2 Texas	56–76	ESPN	17,763
*Game times in CST. #-Rankings denote tournament seed. †All games will be simulcast on ESPN+

== Bracket ==
First round Wednesday, March 8 ESPNU
8	West Virginia	78
9	Texas Tech	62
7	Oklahoma State	57
10	Oklahoma	49

Quarterfinals; Thursday, March 9 ESPN/ESPN2
1	Kansas	78
8	West Virginia	61
4	Baylor	72
5	Iowa State	78
2	Texas	61
7	Oklahoma State	47
3	Kansas State	67
6	TCU	80

Semifinals; Friday, March 10; ESPN
1	Kansas	71
5	Iowa State	58
2	Texas	66
6	TCU	60

Championship; Saturday, March 11; ESPN
1	Kansas	56
2	Texas	76

== All-Tournament Team ==
Most Outstanding Player – Dylan Disu, Texas

Player	Team
Dylan Disu	Texas
Marcus Carr	Texas
Sir'Jabari Rice	Texas
Jalen Wilson	Kansas
Dajuan Harris Jr.	Kansas
Mike Miles Jr.	TCU
