= 2022–23 Oklahoma State Cowboys basketball team =

American college basketball season

2022–23 Oklahoma State Cowboys basketball

NIT, Quarterfinals
- Conference: Big 12 Conference
- Record: 20–16 (8–10 Big 12)
- Head coach: Mike Boynton (6th season)
- Assistant coaches: Terrence Rencher; Larry Blunt; David Cason
- Home arena: Gallagher-Iba Arena

2022–23 Big 12 men's basketball standings
| | Conf. | | | | Overall |
| Team | W | | L | PCT | W | | L | PCT |
|---|---|---|---|---|---|---|---|---|
| No. 4 Kansas | 13 | – | 5 | .722 | 28 | – | 8 | .778 |
| No. 5 Texas † | 12 | – | 6 | .667 | 29 | – | 9 | .763 |
| No. 15 Kansas State | 11 | – | 7 | .611 | 26 | – | 10 | .722 |
| No. 11 Baylor | 11 | – | 7 | .611 | 23 | – | 11 | .676 |
| Iowa State | 9 | – | 9 | .500 | 19 | – | 14 | .576 |
| No. 22 TCU | 9 | – | 9 | .500 | 22 | – | 13 | .629 |
| Oklahoma State | 8 | – | 10 | .444 | 20 | – | 16 | .556 |
| West Virginia | 7 | – | 11 | .389 | 19 | – | 15 | .559 |
| Texas Tech | 5 | – | 13 | .278 | 16 | – | 16 | .500 |
| Oklahoma | 5 | – | 13 | .278 | 15 | – | 17 | .469 |
† 2023 Big 12 tournament winner Rankings from AP poll

The 2022–23 Oklahoma State Cowboys basketball team represented Oklahoma State University during the 2022–23 NCAA Division I men's basketball season. The team was led by sixth-year head coach Mike Boynton, and played its home games at Gallagher-Iba Arena in Stillwater, Oklahoma as a member of the Big 12 Conference. They finished the season 17–14, 8–10 in Big 12 play to finish in seventh place. They defeated Oklahoma in the first round of the Big 12 tournament before losing in the quarterfinals to Texas. They were invited to the National Invitation Tournament where they defeated Youngstown State and Eastern Washington before losing in overtime in the quarterfinals to North Texas.

== Previous season ==
The Cowboys finished the 2021–22 season 15–15, 8–10 in Big 12 play to finish in a tie for fifth place. On November 3, 2021, the NCAA ruled Oklahoma State ineligible for postseason play for the season due to players receiving improper benefits.

== Offseason ==
=== Departures ===
| Name | Number | Pos. | Height | Weight | Year | Hometown | Reason for departure |
|---|---|---|---|---|---|---|---|
| Donovan Williams | 4 | G | 6'5" | 200 | Senior | Rockford, IL | Transferred to Pacific |
| Rondel Walker | 5 | G | 6'4" | 170 | Sophomore | Midwest City, OK | Transferred to TCU |
| Matthew-Alexander Moncrieffe | 12 | F | 6'7" | 215 | Sophomore | Toronto, ON | Transferred to Georgia |
| Isaac Likekele | 13 | G | 6'5" | 215 | Senior | Arlington, TX | Graduate transferred to Ohio State |
| Bryce Williams | 14 | G | 6'2" | 180 | RS Senior | Tampa, FL | Graduated |
| Keylan Boone | 20 | G/F | 6'8" | 200 | Junior | Tulsa, OK | Transferred to Pacific |

=== Incoming transfers ===
| Name | Number | Pos. | Height | Weight | Year | Hometown | Previous school |
|---|---|---|---|---|---|---|---|
| Caleb Asberry | 5 | G | 6'3" | 170 | RS Senior | Pflugerville, TX | Texas State |
| Russell Harrison | 24 | G/F | 6'7" | 200 | Senior | Lubbock, TX | Louisiana–Monroe |
| John-Michael Wright | 51 | G | 6'0" | 186 | Senior | Fayetteville, NC | High Point |

=== Recruiting classes ===
==== 2022 recruiting class ====
College recruiting information
| Name | Hometown | School | Height | Weight | Commit date |
|---|---|---|---|---|---|
| Quion Williams; SG | Mansfield, TX | Mansfield Legacy High School | 6 ft 4 in (1.93 m) | 185 lb (84 kg) | Aug 5, 2021 |
| Quion Williams; SG | Recruit ratings: Rivals: 247Sports: ESPN: (NR) | | | | |
Overall recruit ranking:
Note: In many cases, Scout, Rivals, 247Sports, On3, and ESPN may conflict in their listings of height and weight.; In these cases, the average was taken. ESPN grades are on a 100-point scale.; Sources: "2022 Team Ranking". Rivals.

==== 2023 recruiting class ====
College recruiting information (2023)
| Name | Hometown | School | Height | Weight | Commit date |
|---|---|---|---|---|---|
| Brandon Garrison #5 C | Del City, OK | Del City High School | 6 ft 9 in (2.06 m) | 205 lb (93 kg) | Jul 7, 2022 |
| Brandon Garrison #5 C | Recruit ratings: Rivals: 247Sports: ESPN: (86) | | | | |
| Jamyron Keller #19 PG | Killeen, TX | Ellison High School | 6 ft 2 in (1.88 m) | 195 lb (88 kg) | Aug 14, 2022 |
| Jamyron Keller #19 PG | Recruit ratings: Rivals: 247Sports: ESPN: (81) | | | | |
Overall recruit ranking:
Note: In many cases, Scout, Rivals, 247Sports, On3, and ESPN may conflict in their listings of height and weight.; In these cases, the average was taken. ESPN grades are on a 100-point scale.; Sources: "2023 Team Ranking". Rivals.

== Roster ==
2022–23 Oklahoma State Cowboys men's basketball team
Players
Coaches

| Pos. | # | Name | Height | Weight | Year | Previous school | Hometown |
|---|---|---|---|---|---|---|---|
| G | 0 | Avery Anderson III | 6 ft 3 in (1.91 m) | 158 lb (72 kg) | Sr | Northwest HS | Justin, TX |
| G | 1 | Bryce Thompson | 6 ft 6 in (1.98 m) | 194 lb (88 kg) | Jr | Kansas | Tulsa, OK |
| G | 2 | Chris Harris Jr. | 6 ft 2 in (1.88 m) | 233 lb (106 kg) | Sr | South Garland HS | Dallas, TX |
| F | 4 | Woody Newton | 6 ft 9 in (2.06 m) | 195 lb (88 kg) | Jr | Syracuse | District Heights, MD |
| G | 5 | Caleb Asberry | 6 ft 3 in (1.91 m) | 165 lb (75 kg) | RS Sr | Texas State | Pflugerville, TX |
| G | 12 | Naz Brown (W) | 6 ft 0 in (1.83 m) | 181 lb (82 kg) | Fr | Coppell HS | Fort Worth, TX |
| G | 13 | Quion Williams | 6 ft 4 in (1.93 m) | 208 lb (94 kg) | Fr | Jonesboro HS | Jonesboro, AR |
| G | 15 | Carson Sager (W) | 6 ft 4 in (1.93 m) | 207 lb (94 kg) | Jr | Rider HS | Wichita Falls, TX |
| G | 21 | Brooks Manzer (W) | 6 ft 3 in (1.91 m) | 190 lb (86 kg) | So | Edmond Memorial HS | Edmond, OK |
| F | 22 | Kalib Boone | 6 ft 9 in (2.06 m) | 198 lb (90 kg) | Sr | Tulsa Memorial HS | Tulsa, OK |
| F | 23 | Tyreek Smith | 6 ft 7 in (2.01 m) | 217 lb (98 kg) | RS Jr | Texas Tech | Baton Rouge, LA |
| G/F | 24 | Russell Harrison | 6 ft 5 in (1.96 m) | 182 lb (83 kg) | GS | Louisiana–Monroe | Lubbock, TX |
| F | 25 | Bernard Kouma | 6 ft 10 in (2.08 m) | 240 lb (109 kg) | Sr | South Plains CC | N'Djamena, Chad |
| F | 33 | Moussa Cissé | 7 ft 1 in (2.16 m) | 216 lb (98 kg) | Jr | Memphis | Conakry, Guinea |
| G | 35 | Weston Church (W) | 6 ft 3 in (1.91 m) | 180 lb (82 kg) | Jr | Fairview HS | Fairview, OK |
| G | 51 | John-Michael Wright | 6 ft 1 in (1.85 m) | 190 lb (86 kg) | Sr | High Point | Fayetteville, NC |

Head coach

- Mike Boynton Jr. (South Carolina)

Assistant coach(es)

- Terrence Rencher (Texas)
- Larry Blunt (James Madison)
- David Cason (Illinois State)

Legend

- (C) Team captain
- (S) Suspended
- (I) Ineligible
- (W) Walk-on
- Injured
- Current redshirt

Roster

== Schedule and results ==
| Date time, TV | Rank^{#} | Opponent^{#} | Result | Record | High points | High rebounds | High assists | Site (attendance) city, state |
Exhibition
| November 3, 2022*; 7:00 p.m., ESPN+ | | Ouachita Baptist | W 85–51 | | 15 – Cisse | 17 – Cisse | 3 – Tied | Gallagher-Iba Arena; Stillwater, OK |
Regular season
| November 7, 2022*; 8:00 p.m., ESPN+ | | UT Arlington | W 77–66 | 1–0 | 18 – Thompson | 8 – Boone | 4 – Asberry | Gallagher-Iba Arena; Stillwater, OK |
| November 10, 2022*; 7:00 p.m., ESPN+ | | Southern Illinois | L 60–61 | 1–1 | 14 – Tied | 15 – Cisse | 3 – Anderson III | Gallagher-Iba Arena (5,324); Stillwater, OK |
| November 13, 2022*; 2:00 p.m., ESPN+ | | at Oakland | W 91–62 | 2–1 | 18 – Anderson III | 10 – Cisse | 7 – Anderson III | Athletics Center O'rena (3,651); Rochester, MI |
| November 18, 2022*; 6:00 p.m., CBSSN | | vs. UCF; Bahamas Championship semifinals | L 56–60 ^{OT} | 2–2 | 14 – Cisse | 14 – Cisse | 5 – Anderson III | Baha Mar Convention Center; Nassau, BAH |
| November 20, 2022*; 3:30 p.m., CBSSN | | vs. DePaul; Bahamas Championship | W 82–78 | 3–2 | 17 – Boone | 11 – Cisse | 3 – Boone | Baha Mar Convention Center; Nassau, BAH |
| November 25, 2022*; 7:00 p.m., ESPN+ | | Tulsa | W 82–56 | 4–2 | 18 – Thompson | 8 – Cisse | 4 – Harris Jr. | Gallagher-Iba Arena (9,856); Stillwater, OK |
| November 27, 2022*; 2:00 p.m., ESPN+ | | Prairie View A&M | W 78–53 | 5–2 | 16 – Anderson III | 11 – Cisse | 3 – Tied | Gallagher-Iba Arena (5,683); Stillwater, OK |
| December 1, 2022*; 5:00 p.m., FS1 | | at No. 8 UConn; Big East–Big 12 Battle | L 64–74 | 5–3 | 15 – Boone | 10 – Cisse | 3 – Asberry | Harry A. Gampel Pavilion (10,167); Storrs, CT |
| December 6, 2022*; 8:00 p.m., ESPNU | | Sam Houston | W 65–51 | 6–3 | 17 – Thompson | 13 – Cisse | 4 – Anderson III | Gallagher-Iba Arena (5,368); Stillwater, OK |
| December 11, 2022*; 1:00 p.m., ESPN2 | | vs. Virginia Tech; Basketball Hall of Fame Invitational | L 65–70 | 6–4 | 15 – Tied | 7 – Tied | 4 – Tied | Barclays Center; Brooklyn, NY |
| December 17, 2022*; 8:00 p.m., ESPNU | | at Wichita State | W 59–49 | 7–4 | 19 – Thompson | 12 – Cisse | 5 – Tied | Intrust Bank Arena (7,783); Wichita, KS |
| December 20, 2022*; 2:00 p.m., ESPN+ | | Texas A&M–Corpus Christi | W 81–58 | 8–4 | 13 – Thompson | 14 – Cisse | 9 – Anderson III | Gallagher-Iba Arena (6,007); Stillwater, OK |
| December 31, 2022; 1:00 p.m., CBS | | at No. 4 Kansas | L 67–69 | 8–5 (0–1) | 23 – Thompson | 7 – Boone | 3 – Wright | Allen Fieldhouse (16,300); Lawrence, KS |
| January 2, 2023; 6:00 p.m., ESPNU | | West Virginia | W 67–60 | 9–5 (1–1) | 15 – Thompson | 6 – Tied | 4 – Wright | Gallagher-Iba Arena (6,134); Stillwater, OK |
| January 7, 2023; 11:00 a.m., ESPNU | | No. 6 Texas | L 46–56 | 9–6 (1–2) | 16 – Boone | 10 – Boone | 3 – Asberry | Gallagher-Iba Arena (7,368); Stillwater, OK |
| January 10, 2023; 6:00 p.m., ESPNU | | at No. 11 Kansas State | L 57–65 | 9–7 (1–3) | 23 – Boone | 7 – Smith | 3 – Tied | Bramlage Coliseum (11,000); Manhattan, KS |
| January 14, 2023; 5:00 p.m., ESPN2 | | at Baylor | L 58–74 | 9–8 (1–4) | 14 – Asberry | 7 – Asberry | 3 – Tied | Ferrell Center (9,616); Waco, TX |
| January 18, 2023; 8:00 p.m., ESPNU | | Oklahoma; Bedlam Series | W 72–56 | 10–8 (2–4) | 19 – Thompson | 9 – Thompson | 5 – Anderson III | Gallagher-Iba Arena (10,789); Stillwater, OK |
| January 21, 2023; 1:00 p.m., ESPN+ | | No. 12 Iowa State | W 61–59 | 11–8 (3–4) | 18 – Anderson III | 6 – Tied | 5 – Anderson III | Gallagher-Iba Arena (6,656); Stillwater, OK |
| January 24, 2023; 8:00 p.m., LHN | | at No. 10 Texas | L 75–89 | 11–9 (3–5) | 18 – Tied | 5 – Newton | 9 – Anderson III | Moody Center (10,763); Austin, TX |
| January 28, 2023*; 7:00 p.m., ESPN2 | | Ole Miss; Big 12/SEC Challenge | W 82–60 | 12–9 | 18 – Boone | 6 – Williams | 3 – Thompson | Gallagher-Iba Arena (9,973); Stillwater, OK |
| February 1, 2023; 8:00 p.m., ESPN2 | | at Oklahoma; Bedlam Series | W 71–61 | 13–9 (4–5) | 18 – Tied | 10 – Newton | 5 – Thompson | Lloyd Noble Center (13,431); Norman, OK |
| February 4, 2023; 1:00 p.m., ESPN+ | | No. 15 TCU | W 79–73 | 14–9 (5–5) | 25 – Boone | 6 – Tied | 3 – Tied | Gallagher-Iba Arena (9,581); Stillwater, OK |
| February 8, 2023; 7:00 p.m., ESPN+ | | Texas Tech | W 71–68 | 15–9 (6–5) | 21 – Thompson | 9 – Boone | 3 – Newton | Gallagher-Iba Arena (7,467); Stillwater, OK |
| February 11, 2023; 5:00 p.m., ESPN2 | | at No. 11 Iowa State | W 64–56 | 16–9 (7–5) | 19 – Wright | 8 – Tied | 3 – Tied | Hilton Coliseum (14,267); Ames, IA |
| February 14, 2023; 8:00 p.m., ESPN | | No. 5 Kansas | L 76–87 | 16–10 (7–6) | 27 – Boone | 11 – Cisse | 3 – Thompson | Gallagher-Iba Arena (11,165); Stillwater, OK |
| February 18, 2023; 1:00 p.m., ESPN+ | | at No. 22 TCU | L 75–100 | 16–11 (7–7) | 18 – Thompson | 4 – Tied | 4 – Thompson | Schollmaier Arena (6,404); Fort Worth, TX |
| February 20, 2023; 6:00 p.m., ESPN2 | | at West Virginia | L 67–85 | 16–12 (7–8) | 15 – Asberry | 7 – Tied | 3 – Wright | WVU Coliseum (11,874); Morgantown, WV |
| February 25, 2023; 6:00 p.m., ESPNU | | No. 14 Kansas State | L 72–81 | 16–13 (7–9) | 24 – Disu | 9 – Allen | 6 – Carr | Gallagher-Iba Arena (11,124); Stillwater, OK |
| February 27, 2023; 6:00 p.m., ESPN | | No. 7 Baylor | L 68–74 | 16–14 (7–10) | 17 – Wright | 8 – Cisse | 5 – Asberry | Gallagher-Iba Arena (7,965); Stillwater, OK |
| March 4, 2023; 5:00 p.m., ESPN2 | | at Texas Tech | W 71–68 | 17–14 (8–10) | 24 – Asberry | 9 – Cisse | 6 – Wright | United Supermarkets Arena (13,885); Lubbock, TX |
Big 12 tournament
| March 8, 2023; 8:30 p.m., ESPNU | (7) | vs. (10) Oklahoma; First Round/Bedlam Series | W 57–49 | 18–14 | 15 – Asberry | 14 – Smith | 5 – Thompson | T-Mobile Center; Kansas City, MO |
| March 9, 2023; 6:00 p.m., ESPN2 | (7) | vs. (2) No. 7 Texas; Quarterfinals | L 47–61 | 18–15 | 16 – Asberry | 7 – Smith | 4 – Thompson | T-Mobile Center; Kansas City, MO |
NIT
| March 15, 2023; 7:00 p.m., ESPN+ | (1) | at Youngstown State; First Round – Oklahoma State Bracket | W 69–64 | 19–15 | 13 – Smith | 13 – Cisse | 3 – Tied | Beeghly Center (4,099); Youngstown, OH |
| March 19, 2023; 1:00 p.m., ESPN2 | (1) | Eastern Washington; Second Round – Oklahoma State Bracket | W 71–60 | 20–15 | 22 – Thompson | 10 – Smith | 4 – Williams | Gallagher-Iba Arena (4,978); Stillwater, OK |
| March 21, 2023; 6:00 p.m., ESPN | (1) | (2) North Texas; Quarterfinals – Oklahoma State Bracket | L 59–65 ^{OT} | 20–16 | 14 – Asberry | 10 – Smith | 4 – Thompson | Gallagher-Iba Arena (4,807); Stillwater, OK |
*Non-conference game. ^{#}Rankings from AP Poll. (#) Tournament seedings in parentheses. All times are in Central Time.
