= Rodney Terry =

American college basketball coach (born 1968)

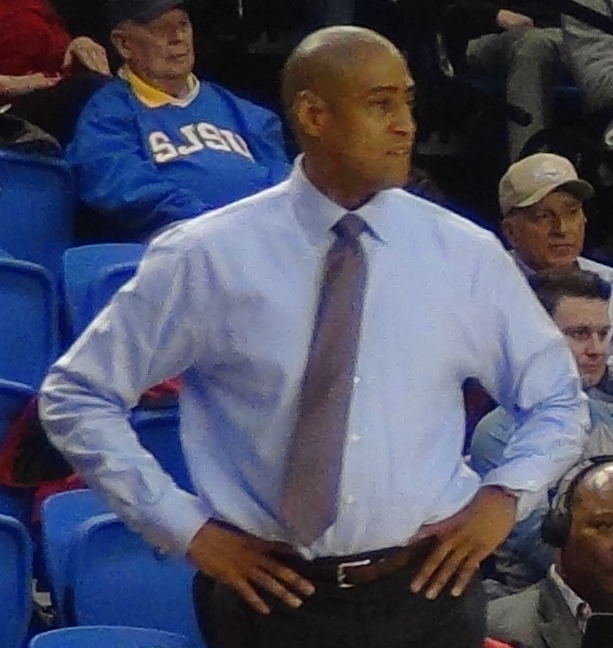
- Terry in 2017

Current position
- Title: Assistant coach
- Team: Vanderbilt
- Conference: SEC

Biographical details
- Born: March 27, 1968 (age 58); Angleton, Texas, U.S.

Playing career
- 1986–1990: St. Edward's
- Position: Point guard

Coaching career (HC unless noted)
- 1990–1991: St. Edward's (assistant)
- 1991–1993: Bowie HS (TX) (assistant)
- 1993–1995: Somerville HS (TX)
- 1995–1996: Angleton HS (TX)
- 1996–1998: Baylor (assistant)
- 1998–2002: UNC Wilmington (assistant)
- 2002–2011: Texas (assistant)
- 2011–2018: Fresno State
- 2018–2021: UTEP
- 2021–2022: Texas (assistant)
- 2022–2023: Texas (interim HC)
- 2023–2025: Texas
- 2026–present: Vanderbilt (assistant)

Head coaching record
- Overall: 225–193 (.538) (college); 64–34 (.653) (high school)
- Tournaments: 4–4 (NCAA Division I); 0–1 (NIT); 4–2 (CBI)

Accomplishments and honors

Championships
- MWC tournament (2016); Big 12 tournament (2023)

Awards
- Sporting News Coach of the Year (2023)

Rodney Eric Terry (born March 27, 1968) is an NBA scout for the New Orleans Pelicans, an ESPN analyst, and assistant coach for the Vanderbilt Commodores. He previously served as head coach at the Fresno State from 2011 to 2018, University of Texas at El Paso from 2018 to 2021, and University of Texas at Austin from 2022 to 2025.

== Early life and education ==
Born in Angleton, Texas, Terry graduated from Angleton High School and played college basketball at St. Edward's University in Austin, where he was the all-time leading scorer (record still stands as of 2025). Terry graduated from St. Edward's in 1990 with a bachelor's degree in business administration with a minor in physical education.

== Coaching career ==
=== Early career ===
Terry began his coaching career as an assistant coach at St. Edward's in the 1990–91 season. Then, Terry became an assistant at James Bowie High School also in Austin, where he would remain from 1991 to 1993.

After his stint at Bowie, Terry became a head coach for the first time at Somerville High School in Somerville, Texas. In his two seasons at Somerville (1993 to 1995), Terry went 49–21 and led Somerville to the Class 2A semifinals in 1994. Terry returned to Angleton High School to be head coach in the 1995–96 season, during which he had a 15–13 record for a cumulative 64–34 high school coaching record.

In 1996, Terry moved up to the major college level as an assistant at Baylor under Harry Miller. After two years at Baylor, Terry joined the staff of Jerry Wainwright as assistant coach at UNCW. During a stint that lasted from 1998 to 2002, Terry helped UNCW make the 2000 and 2002 NCAA Tournaments by way of winning the CAA Tournaments. As a #13 seed in 2002, UNCW upset #4 seed USC in the first round for the first NCAA Tournament win in program history.

On June 11, 2002, Terry joined Texas as an assistant coach under Rick Barnes. At Texas, Terry helped recruit McDonald's All-American players like Kevin Durant, D. J. Augustin, and Tristan Thompson. Texas also made NCAA Tournament runs to the Final Four in 2003 and to the Elite Eight in 2006 and 2008.

=== Fresno State ===
Terry replaced Steve Cleveland as head coach at Fresno State on April 7, 2011. Fresno State went 13–20 (3–11 Western Athletic Conference) in Terry's first season in 2011–12. The following season in 2012–13, Fresno State moved to the Mountain West Conference (MW) and went 11–19.

Fresno State went 21–18 and made the College Basketball Invitational (CBI) in 2013–14 for the program's first 20-win season and postseason appearance since the 2006–07 season. Despite a 1–7 start, Fresno State finished 9–9 in MW play, an unprecedented finish in conference history. Fresno State lost the CBI in three games to Siena. In June 2014, Fresno State extended Terry's contract through 2017.

Despite a 15–17 record in 2014–15, Fresno State improved to 10–8 in MW play and beat four teams that made that year's NCAA tournament: Boise State, San Diego State, UC Irvine, and Wyoming. On January 3, 2015, Fresno State beat #25 San Diego State for its first win over a ranked opponent since 2002.

Terry led Fresno State to a 25–10 record, MW tournament title, and NCAA tournament auto-bid in the 2015–16 season. A #14 seed, Fresno State lost to #3 seed Utah in the first round 80–69. Following a three-year extension and nearly $50,000 annual raise in January 2016, Fresno State extended Terry through the 2020–21 season in December 2016.

=== UTEP ===
On March 12, 2018, Terry was named the new head coach of the University of Texas at El Paso men's basketball team. Terry suffered an attack of anaphylactic shock due to an adverse reaction to medication and was hospitalized in late December 2019. He missed a game against Florida International on January 2, 2020, with assistant coach Kenton Paulino taking over for Terry. Terry was expected to make a full recovery. After starting 8–1 to open the 2019–20 season, Terry and the Miners lost 14 out of their last 23 games.

On April 6, 2021, it was reported Terry would leave UTEP to return to Texas as an assistant under newly hired Chris Beard.

=== Texas ===
Terry was named interim head coach for the Longhorns following Beard’s arrest for domestic violence on December 12, 2022. He would lead the team through the remainder of the season, guiding Texas to their second Big 12 tournament title, and the Longhorns' first appearance in the Elite Eight round of the NCAA tournament since 2008.

On March 27, 2023, Terry was named the full-time head coach.

Terry would lead Texas to the NCAA tournament in all three seasons at the helm, advancing to the round of 32 in 2024 in addition to the aforementioned Elite Eight appearance. After losing the First Four game against Xavier in 2025, he was let go by the program.

== Career ==
On October 31, 2025, it was announced that Terry would be joining ESPN as an analyst and serving as a scout for the New Orleans Pelicans.

== Personal life ==
Terry is a Christian. He has said, “There’s only one person that’s going to judge you. He gave His only Son to us to be able to forgive us of our sins. I live by that every day, and I have strong faith and strong belief.”

== Popular culture ==
Since Texas made its run in the NCAA Tournament, there have been frequent references to Terry's resemblance to Giancarlo Esposito's Breaking Bad & Better Call Saul character Gus Fring.

== Head coaching record ==
Record table
| Season | Team | Overall | Conference | Standing | Postseason |
|---|---|---|---|---|---|
Fresno State Bulldogs (Western Athletic Conference) (2011–2012)
| 2011–12 | Fresno State | 13–20 | 3–11 | 7th | |
Fresno State Bulldogs (Mountain West Conference) (2012–2018)
| 2012–13 | Fresno State | 11–19 | 5–11 | 6th | |
| 2013–14 | Fresno State | 21–18 | 9–9 | T–5th | CBI Runner-up |
| 2014–15 | Fresno State | 15–17 | 10–8 | 6th | |
| 2015–16 | Fresno State | 25–10 | 13–5 | 2nd | NCAA Division I Round of 64 |
| 2016–17 | Fresno State | 20–13 | 11–7 | 4th | NIT first round |
| 2017–18 | Fresno State | 21–11 | 11–7 | T–4th | |
| Fresno State: | | 126–108 (.538) | 62–58 (.517) | | |
UTEP Miners (Conference USA) (2018–2021)
| 2018–19 | UTEP | 8–21 | 3–15 | 14th | |
| 2019–20 | UTEP | 17–15 | 8–10 | 11th | |
| 2020–21 | UTEP | 12–12 | 8–8 | 5th (West) | |
| UTEP: | | 37–48 (.435) | 19–33 (.365) | | |
Texas Longhorns (Big 12 Conference) (2022–2024)
| 2022–23 | Texas | 22–8 (Note: Served as interim head coach after Chris Beard was indefinitely suspended and later fired.) | 12–6 | 2nd | NCAA Division I Elite Eight |
| 2023–24 | Texas | 21–13 | 9–9 | T–7th | NCAA Division I Round of 32 |
Texas Longhorns (Southeastern Conference) (2024–2025)
| 2024–25 | Texas | 19–16 | 6–12 | T–13th | NCAA Division I First Four |
| Texas: | | 62–37 (.626) | 27–27 (.500) | | |
| Total: | | 225–193 (.538) | | | |
National champion Postseason invitational champion Conference regular season champion Conference regular season and conference tournament champion Division regular season champion Division regular season and conference tournament champion Conference tournament champion
