= Tyrese Hunter =

American basketball player (born 2003)

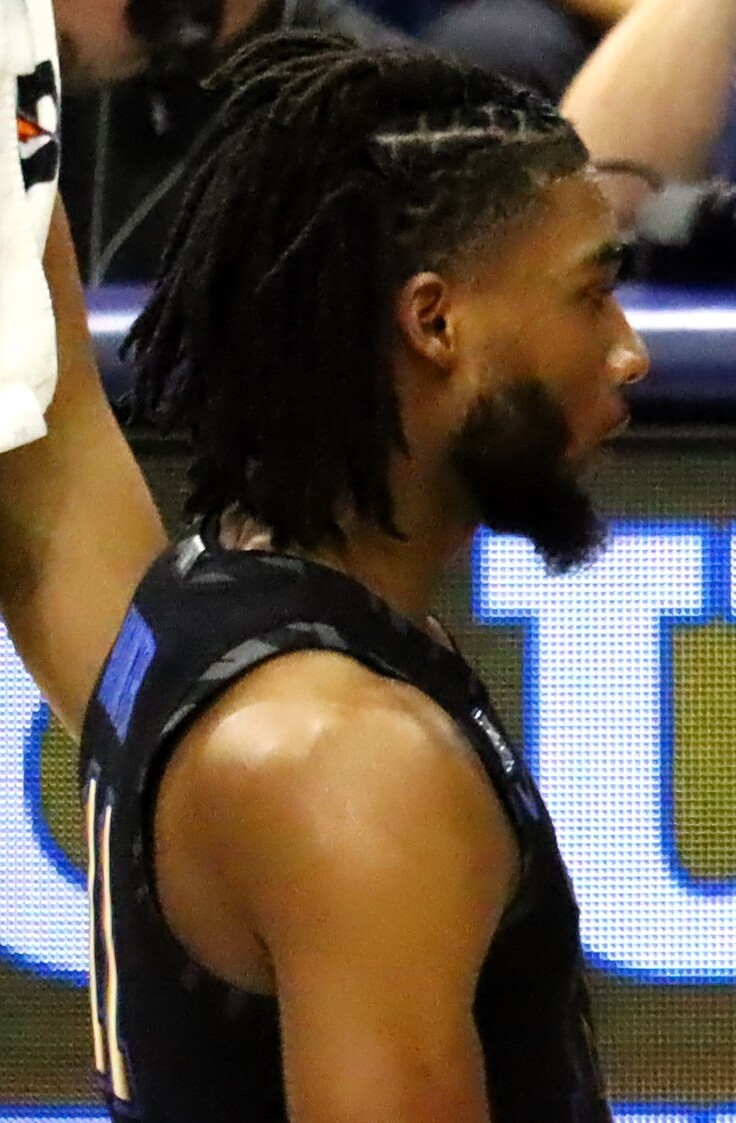
- Hunter in 2025

No. 0 – Brampton Honey Badgers
- Position: Point guard
- League: CEBL

Personal information
- Born: August 11, 2003 (age 23) Racine, Wisconsin, U.S.
- Listed height: 6 ft 0 in (1.83 m)
- Listed weight: 180 lb (82 kg)

Career information
- High school: St Catherine's (Racine, Wisconsin)
- College: Iowa State (2021–2022); Texas (2022–2024); Memphis (2024–2025)
- NBA draft: 2025: undrafted
- Playing career: 2025–present

Career history
- 2025: Rio Grande Valley Vipers
- 2026: Raptors 905
- 2026: South Bay Lakers
- 2026–present: Brampton Honey Badgers

Career highlights
- Big 12 Freshman of the Year (2022)
- Stats at NBA.com
- Stats at Basketball Reference

Tyrese Hunter (born August 11, 2003) is an American professional basketball player for the Brampton Honey Badgers of the Canadian Elite Basketball League (CEBL). He played college basketball for the Iowa State Cyclones, Texas Longhorns and Memphis Tigers. He also previously played for the South Bay Lakers of the NBA G League.

== High school career ==
Hunter attended St Catherine's High School in Racine, Wisconsin where he played on the basketball team, scoring 1,589 career points, and leading the team to a Division 3 Wisconsin State Championship as a senior. A consensus 4 star prospect ranked the nations #37 overall recruit, he committed to Iowa State University to play college basketball.

== College career ==
=== Iowa State ===
As a freshman at Iowa State, Hunter averaged 11.0 points, 4.9 assists and 3.5 rebounds per game. In the Cyclones opening game of the 2022 NCAA Tournament, Hunter scored a season high 23 points to lead Iowa State to a 59–54 victory over LSU. At the conclusion of his freshman season, Hunter was named the Big 12 Freshman of the year. On April 18, 2022, Hunter announced that he was entering the transfer portal.

=== Texas ===
Ranked the nations #3 overall transfer by ESPN, Hunter would transfer to Texas. He averaged 10.3 points, three rebounds and 2.5 assists per game. Hunter declared for the 2023 NBA draft before withdrawing and returning to Texas. In his junior year, Hunter averaged 11.1 points, 2.9 rebounds, and 4.1 assists per game. At the end of the season, he entered the transfer portal.

=== Memphis ===
After entering the transfer portal, Hunter would then commit to Memphis for his senior year. At Memphis, he averaged 13.7 points, 3.8 rebounds, and 3.6 assists per game while shooting 40.1% on threes.

== Professional career ==
=== Rio Grande Valley Vipers (2025) ===
After going undrafted in the 2025 NBA draft, Hunter signed an Exhibit-10 contract with the Houston Rockets. He was then waived and allocated to the Rio Grande Valley Vipers. Throughout the 2025-2026 NBA G League Tip-Off Tournament, Hunter played in all 14 games, averaging 7.3 points, 1.5 rebounds, 2.0 assists, and 1.2 steals in 18.7 minutes per game. On January 5, 2026, he was waived.

=== Raptors 905 (2026) ===
On January 21, 2026, Hunter was claimed off waivers by the Raptors 905. He made his debut on January 23 against the Long Island Nets, recording seven points, one rebound, and one steal in 13 minutes of play. On January 30, Hunter was waived.

=== South Bay Lakers (2026) ===
On February 16, 2026, Hunter was claimed from G League player pool by the South Bay Lakers.

=== Brampton Honey Badgers (2026–present) ===
On May 5, 2026, Hunter signed with the Brampton Honey Badgers of the Canadian Elite Basketball League.

== Career statistics ==
Legend
GP	Games played	GS	Games started	MPG	Minutes per game
FG%	Field goal percentage	3P%	3-point field goal percentage	FT%	Free throw percentage
RPG	Rebounds per game	APG	Assists per game	SPG	Steals per game
BPG	Blocks per game	PPG	Points per game	**Bold**	Career high

=== Professional ===
Year	Team	GP	GS	MPG	FG%	3P%	FT%	RPG	APG	SPG	BPG	PPG
2025-26	Rio Grande Valley Vipers	1	-	4.2	.000	.000	-	2.0	0.0	1.0	0.0	0.0
2025-26	Raptors 905	1	-	13.6	.333	.333	1.0	1.0	0.0	1.0	0.0	7.0
2025-26	South Bay Lakers	10	-	7.9	.458	.313	.857	0.7	1.1	0.4	0.1	3.5
2026	Brampton Honey Badgers	15	9	24.5	.374	.321	.786	2.9	4.3	1.2	0.1	11.0

=== College ===
Year	Team	GP	GS	MPG	FG%	3P%	FT%	RPG	APG	SPG	BPG	PPG
2021–22	Iowa State	35	35	31.9	.391	.274	.687	3.5	**4.9**	**2.0**	**0.3**	11.0
2022–23	Texas	**38**	**38**	30.3	.394	.337	**.800**	3.0	2.5	0.8	0.2	10.3
2023–24	Texas	33	33	32.1	**.452**	.343	.716	2.9	4.1	1.3	0.2	11.1
2024-25	Memphis	32	32	**34.0**	.415	**.401**	.774	**3.8**	3.6	1.5	0.2	**13.7**
Career		138	138	32.0	.411	.344	.741	3.3	3.7	1.4	0.2	11.4
