= 2022–23 Texas Tech Red Raiders basketball team =

American college basketball season

2022–23 Texas Tech Red Raiders basketball
- Conference: Big 12 Conference
- Record: 16–16 (5–13 Big 12)
- Head coach: Mark Adams (2nd season; regular season games); Corey Williams (Big 12 Tournament)
- Assistant coaches: Corey Williams (2nd season); Al Pinkins (1st season); Steve Green (1st season)
- Home arena: United Supermarkets Arena

2022–23 Big 12 men's basketball standings
| | Conf. | | | | Overall |
| Team | W | | L | PCT | W | | L | PCT |
|---|---|---|---|---|---|---|---|---|
| No. 4 Kansas | 13 | – | 5 | .722 | 28 | – | 8 | .778 |
| No. 5 Texas † | 12 | – | 6 | .667 | 29 | – | 9 | .763 |
| No. 15 Kansas State | 11 | – | 7 | .611 | 26 | – | 10 | .722 |
| No. 11 Baylor | 11 | – | 7 | .611 | 23 | – | 11 | .676 |
| Iowa State | 9 | – | 9 | .500 | 19 | – | 14 | .576 |
| No. 22 TCU | 9 | – | 9 | .500 | 22 | – | 13 | .629 |
| Oklahoma State | 8 | – | 10 | .444 | 20 | – | 16 | .556 |
| West Virginia | 7 | – | 11 | .389 | 19 | – | 15 | .559 |
| Texas Tech | 5 | – | 13 | .278 | 16 | – | 16 | .500 |
| Oklahoma | 5 | – | 13 | .278 | 15 | – | 17 | .469 |
† 2023 Big 12 tournament winner Rankings from AP poll

The 2022–23 Texas Tech Red Raiders basketball team represented Texas Tech University in the 2022–23 NCAA Division I men's basketball season as a member of the Big 12 Conference. The Red Raiders were led by second-year coach Mark Adams. They played their home games at the United Supermarkets Arena in Lubbock, Texas. They finished the season 16–16, 5–13 in Big 12 play to finish in a tie for last place. As the No. 9 seed the Big 12 tournament, they lost to West Virginia in the first round.

The day after the Red Raiders' final regular season game, Mark Adams was suspended for what the school called an "inappropriate, unacceptable, and racially insensitive comment" that he had made the previous week. On March 8, 2023, Adams resigned. On March 31, the school named North Texas head coach Grant McCasland the team's new head coach.

== Previous season ==
The Red Raiders finished the 2021–22 season 27–10, 12–6 in Big 12 play to finish in third place. In the Big 12 tournament, they defeated Iowa State and Oklahoma to advance to the championship game where they lost to Kansas. They received an at-large bid to the NCAA tournament as the No. 3 seed in the West region. There they defeated Montana State and Notre Dame to advance to the Sweet Sixteen. In the Sweet Sixteen, they lost to Duke.

== Offseason ==
Departures
| Name | Number | Pos. | Height | Weight | Year | Hometown | Reason for Departure |
|---|---|---|---|---|---|---|---|
| Terrence Shannon Jr. | 1 | G | 6’6” | 215 lbs | Junior | Chicago, IL | Transferred to Illinois |
| Davion Warren | 2 | G | 6’6” | 205 lbs | Super-Senior | Buffalo, NY | Graduated |
| Bryson Williams | 11 | F | 6’8” | 240 lbs | Super-Senior | Sacramento, CA | Graduated |
| Mylik Wilson | 13 | G | 6’3” | 175 lbs | Junior | Rayville, LA | Transferred to Houston |
| Marcus Santos-Silva | 14 | F | 6’7” | 250 lbs | Super-Senior | Taunton, MA | Graduated |
| Kevin McCullar Jr. | 15 | G | 6’6” | 210 lbs | (redshirt) Junior | San Antonio, TX | Transferred to Kansas |
| Chibuzo Agbo | 23 | G | 6’7” | 220 lbs | Sophomore | San Diego, CA | Transferred to Boise State |
| Adonis Arms | 25 | G | 6’5” | 200 lbs | Super-Senior | Milwaukee, WI | Graduated |

Incoming transfers
| Name | Number | Pos. | Height | Weight | Year | Hometown | Previous School |
|---|---|---|---|---|---|---|---|
| D'Maurian Williams | 3 | G | 6’5” | 195 lbs | Junior | Phoenix, AZ | Gardner-Webb |
| Fardaws Aimaq | 11 | F | 6’11” | 245 lbs | (redshirt) Junior | Vancouver, BC | Utah Valley |
| Jaylon Tyson | 20 | G | 6’7” | 185 lbs | (redshirt) Freshman | Plano, TX | Texas |
| De'Vion Harmon | 23 | G | 6’2” | 192 lbs | Senior | Denton, TX | Oregon |
| Kerwin Walton | 24 | G | 6’5” | 210 lbs | Junior | Hopkins, MN | North Carolina |

=== Recruiting classes ===
==== 2022 recruiting class ====
College recruiting
| Name | Hometown | School | Height | Weight | Commit date |
|---|---|---|---|---|---|
| Elijah Fisher #22 SG / SF | Oshawa, ON | Crestwood Prep | 6 ft 7 in (2.01 m) | 195 lb (88 kg) | May 26, 2022 |
| Elijah Fisher #22 SG / SF | Recruit ratings: Scout: Rivals: 247Sports: ESPN: (93) | | | | |
| Richard Isaacs #11 PG | Las Vegas, NV | Coronado High School | 6 ft 2 in (1.88 m) | 175 lb (79 kg) | Sep 9, 2021 |
| Richard Isaacs #11 PG | Recruit ratings: Scout: Rivals: 247Sports: ESPN: (82) | | | | |
| Lamar Washington #9 SG | Chandler, AZ | Compass Prep | 6 ft 4 in (1.93 m) | 205 lb (93 kg) | Dec 23, 2021 |
| Lamar Washington #9 SG | Recruit ratings: Scout: Rivals: 247Sports: ESPN: (81) | | | | |
| Robert Jennings #33 PF | DeSoto, TX | Texas Association of Christian Athletes | 6 ft 7 in (2.01 m) | 200 lb (91 kg) | Sep 30, 2021 |
| Robert Jennings #33 PF | Recruit ratings: Scout: Rivals: 247Sports: ESPN: (80) | | | | |
Overall recruit ranking:
Note: In many cases, Scout, Rivals, 247Sports, On3, and ESPN may conflict in their listings of height and weight.; In these cases, the average was taken. ESPN grades are on a 100-point scale.; Sources: "2022 Team Ranking". Rivals.

== Roster ==
2021–22 Texas Tech Red Raiders men's basketball team
Players
Coaches

| Pos. | # | Name | Height | Weight | Year | Previous school | Hometown |
|---|---|---|---|---|---|---|---|
| F | 0 | Kevin Obanor | 6 ft 8 in (2.03 m) | 235 lb (107 kg) | RS Sr | Oral Roberts | Houston, TX |
| G | 1 | Lamar Washington | 6 ft 4 in (1.93 m) | 205 lb (93 kg) | Fr | Compass Prep | Chandler, AZ |
| G | 2 | Richard Pop Isaacs | 6 ft 2 in (1.88 m) | 170 lb (77 kg) | Fr | Las Vegas Coronado | Las Vegas, NV |
| G | 3 | D'Maurian Williams | 6 ft 3 in (1.91 m) | 200 lb (91 kg) | Jr | Gardner-Webb | Phoenix, AZ |
| F | 4 | Robert Jennings | 6 ft 7 in (2.01 m) | 225 lb (102 kg) | Fr | Texas Alliance of Christian Athletes | DeSoto, TX |
| F | 5 | K. J. Allen | 6 ft 6 in (1.98 m) | 255 lb (116 kg) | So | East Los Angeles College | Los Angeles, CA |
| F | 11 | Fardaws Aimaq (injured) | 6 ft 11 in (2.11 m) | 245 lb (111 kg) | RS Jr | Utah Valley | Vancouver, BC |
| F | 12 | Daniel Batcho | 6 ft 11 in (2.11 m) | 235 lb (107 kg) | RS So | Arizona | Paris, France |
| G | 13 | CJ Williams (W) | 6 ft 1 in (1.85 m) | 155 lb (70 kg) | Fr | Fayetteville | Fayetteville, AR |
| G | 20 | Jaylon Tyson | 6 ft 6 in (1.98 m) | 210 lb (95 kg) | RS Fr | Texas | Plano, TX |
| G | 22 | Elijah Fisher | 6 ft 6 in (1.98 m) | 190 lb (86 kg) | Fr | Crestwood Prep | Oshawa, ON |
| G | 23 | De'Vion Harmon | 6 ft 2 in (1.88 m) | 205 lb (93 kg) | Sr | Oregon | Denton, TX |
| G | 24 | Kerwin Walton | 6 ft 5 in (1.96 m) | 200 lb (91 kg) | Jr | North Carolina | Hopkins, MN |

Head coach

- Mark Adams (Texas Tech)

Assistant coach(es)

- Corey Williams (Oklahoma State)
- Al Pinkins (NC State)
- Steve Green (Oklahoma Christian)

Legend

- (C) Team captain
- (S) Suspended
- (I) Ineligible
- (W) Walk-on
- Injured
- Current redshirt

Roster

== Schedule and results ==
| Date time, TV | Rank^{#} | Opponent^{#} | Result | Record | High points | High rebounds | High assists | Site (attendance) city, state |
Regular season
| November 7, 2022*; 8:00 p.m., ESPN+ | No. 25 | Northwestern State | W 73–49 | 1–0 | 12 – Batcho | 10 – Batcho | 4 – Tied | United Supermarkets Arena (15,098); Lubbock, TX |
| November 10, 2022*; 7:00 p.m., ESPN+ | No. 25 | Texas Southern | W 78–54 | 2–0 | 13 – Tied | 6 – Obanor | 4 – Isaacs | United Supermarkets Arena (13,835); Lubbock, TX |
| November 14, 2022*; 7:00 p.m., ESPN+ | No. 23 | Louisiana Tech | W 64–55 | 3–0 | 15 – Tied | 8 – Obanor | 6 – Harmon | United Supermarkets Arena (13,027); Lubbock, TX |
| November 21, 2022*; 1:30 p.m., ESPN2 | No. 21 | vs. No. 10 Creighton; Maui Invitational Tournament quarterfinals | L 65–76 | 3–1 | 17 – Batcho | 5 – Tied | 3 – Tied | Lahaina Civic Center (2,400); Maui, HI |
| November 22, 2022*; 1:30 p.m., ESPN2 | No. 21 | vs. Louisville; Maui Invitational Tournament consolation round | W 70–38 | 4–1 | 15 – Obanor | 12 – Batcho | 4 – Washington | Lahaina Civic Center (2,400); Maui, HI |
| November 23, 2022*; 1:30 p.m., ESPN2 | No. 21 | vs. Ohio State; Maui Invitational Tournament 5th–place game | L 73–80 | 4–2 | 21 – Batcho | 6 – Tied | 6 – Harmon | Lahaina Civic Center (2,400); Maui, HI |
| November 30, 2022*; 7:00 p.m., ESPN+ | | Georgetown; Big East–Big 12 Battle | W 79–65 | 5–2 | 18 – Tied | 13 – Batcho | 4 – Isaacs | United Supermarkets Arena (14,649); Lubbock, TX |
| December 7, 2022*; 7:00 p.m., ESPN+ | | Nicholls | W 78–71 | 6–2 | 24 – Isaacs | 9 – Batcho | 5 – Tied | United Supermarkets Arena (12,682); Lubbock, TX |
| December 13, 2022*; 7:00 p.m., ESPN+ | | Eastern Washington | W 77–70 | 7–2 | 25 – Obanor | 6 – Obanor | 4 – Washington | United Supermarkets Arena (11,627); Lubbock, TX |
| December 17, 2022*; 3:00 p.m., HBCUGO | | vs. Jackson State; HBCU Roundball Classic | W 102–52 | 8–2 | 17 – Williams | 7 – Allen | 2 – Tied | Delmar Fieldhouse (1,424); Houston, TX |
| December 21, 2022*; 1:00 p.m., ESPN+ | | Houston Christian | W 111–67 | 9–2 | 22 – Tied | 10 – Batcho | 9 – Harmon | United Supermarkets Arena (10,025); Lubbock, TX |
| December 27, 2022*; 7:00 p.m., ESPN+ | | South Carolina State | W 110–71 | 10–2 | 24 – Obanor | 9 – Obanor | 7 – Harmon | United Supermarkets Arena (13,473); Lubbock, TX |
| December 31, 2022; 11:00 a.m., ESPNU | | at No. 18 TCU | L 61–67 | 10–3 (0–1) | 17 – Isaacs | 9 – Batcho | 4 – Tyson | Schollmaier Arena (5,899); Fort Worth, TX |
| January 3, 2023; 8:00 p.m., ESPN2 | | No. 3 Kansas | L 72–75 | 10–4 (0–2) | 26 – Obanor | 9 – Tyson | 3 – Tyson | United Supermarkets Arena (14,385); Lubbock, TX |
| January 7, 2023; 6:00 p.m., ESPN+ | | Oklahoma | L 63–68 ^{OT} | 10–5 (0–3) | 23 – Harmon | 6 – Tied | 7 – Tied | United Supermarkets Arena (14,082); Lubbock, TX |
| January 10, 2023; 7:00 p.m., ESPN+ | | at No. 14 Iowa State | L 50–84 | 10–6 (0–4) | 14 – Harmon | 5 – Harmon | 4 – Harmon | Hilton Coliseum (13,464); Ames, IA |
| January 14, 2023; 7:00 p.m., ESPN | | at No. 10 Texas | L 70–72 | 10–7 (0–5) | 23 – Isaacs | 14 – Tyson | 3 – Isaacs | Moody Center (11,313); Austin, TX |
| January 17, 2023; 8:00 p.m., ESPNU | | No. 21 Baylor | L 74–81 | 10–8 (0–6) | 19 – Tyson | 12 – Tyson | 6 – Harmon | United Supermarkets Arena (14,152); Lubbock, TX |
| January 21, 2023; 1:00 p.m., ESPN2 | | at No. 13 Kansas State | L 58–68 | 10–9 (0–7) | 13 – Tied | 8 – Obanor | 3 – Tied | Bramlage Coliseum (11,000); Manhattan, KS |
| January 25, 2023; 6:00 p.m., ESPNU | | West Virginia | L 61–76 | 10–10 (0–8) | 20 – Obanor | 8 – Obanor | 3 – Batcho | United Supermarkets Arena (11,802); Lubbock, TX |
| January 28, 2023*; 1:00 p.m., ESPNU | | at LSU; Big 12/SEC Challenge | W 76–68 | 11–10 | 22 – Obanor | 9 – Fisher | 8 – Harmon | Pete Maravich Assembly Center (9,939); Baton Rouge, LA |
| January 30, 2023; 8:00 p.m., ESPN2 | | No. 13 Iowa State | W 80–77 ^{OT} | 12–10 (1–8) | 24 – Obanor | 13 – Obanor | 5 – Harmon | United Supermarkets Arena (10,428); Lubbock, TX |
| February 4, 2023; 12:00 p.m., CBS | | at No. 11 Baylor | L 62–89 | 12–11 (1–9) | 20 – Harmon | 10 – Tyson | 5 – Washington | Ferrell Center (10,343); Waco, TX |
| February 8, 2023; 7:00 p.m., ESPN+ | | at Oklahoma State | L 68–71 | 12–12 (1–10) | 20 – Tyson | 7 – Obanor | 2 – Tied | Gallagher-Iba Arena (7,467); Stillwater, OK |
| February 11, 2023; 6:00 p.m., ESPN+ | | No. 12 Kansas State | W 71–63 | 13–12 (2–10) | 20 – Harmon | 6 – Obanor | 4 – Harmon | United Supermarkets Arena (12,973); Lubbock, TX |
| February 13, 2023; 8:00 p.m., ESPN | | No. 6 Texas | W 74–67 | 14–12 (3–10) | 25 – Harmon | 8 – Aimaq | 3 – Tied | United Supermarkets Arena (14,241); Lubbock, TX |
| February 18, 2023; 11:00 a.m., ESPNU | | at West Virginia | W 68–62 | 15–12 (4–10) | 27 – Tyson | 12 – Aimaq | 3 – Harmon | WVU Coliseum (13,940); Morgantown, WV |
| February 21, 2023; 8:00 p.m., ESPN2 | | at Oklahoma | W 74–63 | 16–12 (5–10) | 19 – Aimaq | 10 – Aimaq | 4 – Harmon | Lloyd Noble Center (5,203); Norman, OK |
| February 25, 2023; 11:00 a.m., ESPN2 | | No. 24 TCU | L 82–83 | 16–13 (5–11) | 19 – Aimaq | 9 – Obanor | 5 – Tied | United Supermarkets Arena (14,410); Lubbock, TX |
| February 28, 2023; 8:00 p.m., ESPN | | at No. 3 Kansas | L 63–67 | 16–14 (5–12) | 15 – Harmon | 18 – Aimaq | 3 – Tyson | Allen Fieldhouse (16,300); Lawrence, KS |
| March 4, 2023; 5:00 p.m., ESPN2 | | Oklahoma State | L 68–71 | 16–15 (5–13) | 9 – Tied | 8 – Aimaq | 6 – Harmon | United Supermarkets Arena (13,885); Lubbock, TX |
Big 12 tournament
| March 8, 2023; 6:00 p.m., ESPNU | (9) | vs. (8) West Virginia; First round | L 62–78 | 16–16 | 15 – Isaacs | 7 – Batcho | 4 – Isaacs | T-Mobile Center; Kansas City, MO |
*Non-conference game. ^{#}Rankings from AP Poll. (#) Tournament seedings in parentheses. W=West. All times are in Central Time.

Source Source

== Rankings ==
Ranking movements Legend: ██ Increase in ranking ██ Decrease in ranking — = Not ranked RV = Received votes
| | Week | | | | | | | | | | | | | | | | | | | |
| Poll | Pre | 1 | 2 | 3 | 4 | 5 | 6 | 7 | 8 | 9 | 10 | 11 | 12 | 13 | 14 | 15 | 16 | 17 | 18 | Final |
|---|---|---|---|---|---|---|---|---|---|---|---|---|---|---|---|---|---|---|---|---|
| AP | 25 | 23 | 21 | RV | RV | RV | RV | RV | — | — | — | — | — | — | — | — | — | — | — | Not released |
| Coaches | 24 | 22 | 20 | RV | RV | RV | RV | RV | RV | RV | RV | RV | — | — | — | — | RV | — | — | |

*AP does not release post-NCAA tournament rankings.
