= 2022–23 Oklahoma Sooners men's basketball team =

American college basketball season

2022–23 Oklahoma Sooners men's basketball

ESPN Events Invitational champions
- Conference: Big 12 Conference
- Record: 15–17 (5–13 Big 12)
- Head coach: Porter Moser (2nd season)
- Assistant coaches: Emanuel Dildy (2nd season); Ryan Humphrey (1st season)
- Home arena: Lloyd Noble Center

2022–23 Big 12 men's basketball standings
| | Conf. | | | | Overall |
| Team | W | | L | PCT | W | | L | PCT |
|---|---|---|---|---|---|---|---|---|
| No. 4 Kansas | 13 | – | 5 | .722 | 28 | – | 8 | .778 |
| No. 5 Texas † | 12 | – | 6 | .667 | 29 | – | 9 | .763 |
| No. 15 Kansas State | 11 | – | 7 | .611 | 26 | – | 10 | .722 |
| No. 11 Baylor | 11 | – | 7 | .611 | 23 | – | 11 | .676 |
| Iowa State | 9 | – | 9 | .500 | 19 | – | 14 | .576 |
| No. 22 TCU | 9 | – | 9 | .500 | 22 | – | 13 | .629 |
| Oklahoma State | 8 | – | 10 | .444 | 20 | – | 16 | .556 |
| West Virginia | 7 | – | 11 | .389 | 19 | – | 15 | .559 |
| Texas Tech | 5 | – | 13 | .278 | 16 | – | 16 | .500 |
| Oklahoma | 5 | – | 13 | .278 | 15 | – | 17 | .469 |
† 2023 Big 12 tournament winner Rankings from AP poll

The 2022–23 Oklahoma Sooners men's basketball team represented the University of Oklahoma during the 2022–23 NCAA Division I men's basketball season. The team was led by head coach Porter Moser in his second year and played their home games at Lloyd Noble Center in Norman, Oklahoma, as members of the Big 12 Conference. They finished the season 15–16, 5–13 in Big 12 Play to tie for 9th (last) place. They were defeated by rivals Oklahoma State in the opening round of the Big 12 tournament.

== Previous season ==
The Sooners finished the 2021–22 season 19–16, 7–11 in Big 12 Play to finish in eighth place. They defeated Baylor in the quarterfinals of the Big 12 tournament before losing in the semifinals to Texas Tech. They were one of the last four teams not selected for the NCAA tournament. When no team withdrew from the NCAA Tournament, they received an at-large bid to the National Invitation Tournament where they defeated Missouri State before losing to St. Bonaventure.

== Offseason ==
=== Departures ===
Oklahoma Departures
| Name | Number | Pos. | Height | Weight | Year | Hometown | Reason for Departure |
|---|---|---|---|---|---|---|---|
| Jordan Goldwire | 0 | G | 6'3" | 194 | Graduate Student | Norcross, GA | Graduated |
| Alston Mason | 3 | G | 6'2" | 169 | Freshman | Overland Park, KS | Transferred to Missouri State |
| Marvin Johnson | 5 | G | 6'5" | 184 | Graduate Student | Ardmore, OK | Graduated |
| Akolda Mawein | 11 | F | 6'8" | 221 | Junior | Sydney, Australia | Transferred to Sacramento State |
| Ethan Chargois | 15 | F/C | 6'9" | 231 | Graduate Student | Tulsa, OK | Graduated |
| Rick Issanza | 20 | C | 7'1" | 230 | (redshirt) Sophomore | Kinshasa, Congo | Transferred to Loyola Marymount |
| Elijah Harkless | 55 | G | 6'3" | 195 | Senior | San Bernardino, CA | Graduate transferred to UNLV |

=== Incoming transfers ===
Oklahoma Incoming transfers
| Name | Number | Pos. | Height | Weight | Year | Hometown | Previous school |
|---|---|---|---|---|---|---|---|
| Joe Bamisile | 4 | G | 6'4" | 195 | Junior | Chesterfield, VA | George Washington |
| Sam Godwin | 10 | F | 6'9" | 230 | Junior | Moore, OK | Wofford |
| Yaya Keita | 11 | F | 6'8" | 240 | Sophomore | St. Louis, MO | Missouri |
| Grant Sherfield | 25 | G | 6'2" | 189 | Senior | Fort Worth, TX | Nevada |

=== 2022 recruiting class ===
College recruiting information
| Name | Hometown | School | Height | Weight | Commit date |
|---|---|---|---|---|---|
| Otega Oweh; SG | Somerset, NJ | Blair Academy | 6 ft 3 in (1.91 m) | 170 lb (77 kg) | Oct 1, 2021 |
| Otega Oweh; SG | Recruit ratings: Rivals: 247Sports: ESPN: (84) | | | | |
| Milos Uzan; PG | Las Vegas, NV | Desert Pines | 6 ft 3 in (1.91 m) | 175 lb (79 kg) | Oct 17, 2021 |
| Milos Uzan; PG | Recruit ratings: Rivals: 247Sports: ESPN: (85) | | | | |
| Luke Northweather; PF | Jefferson City, MO | Blair Oaks | 6 ft 10 in (2.08 m) | 225 lb (102 kg) | Apr 29, 2022 |
| Luke Northweather; PF | Recruit ratings: Rivals: | | | | |
Overall recruit ranking:
Note: In many cases, Scout, Rivals, 247Sports, On3, and ESPN may conflict in their listings of height and weight.; In these cases, the average was taken. ESPN grades are on a 100-point scale.; Sources: "Oklahoma 2022 Basketball Commitments". Rivals.; "2022 Oklahoma Basketball Commits". Scout.; "ESPN". ESPN.; "Scout.com Team Recruiting Rankings". Scout.; "2022 Team Ranking". Rivals.

== Roster ==
2022–23 Oklahoma Sooners men's basketball team
Players
Coaches

| Pos. | # | Name | Height | Weight | Year | Previous school | Hometown |
|---|---|---|---|---|---|---|---|
| G | 0 | Benny Schroeder | 6 ft 7 in (2.01 m) | 198 lb (90 kg) | Fr | Kickz Ibam | Munich, Germany |
| F | 1 | Jalen Hill | 6 ft 6 in (1.98 m) | 232 lb (105 kg) | Sr | Clark | Las Vegas, NV |
| G | 3 | Otega Oweh | 6 ft 5 in (1.96 m) | 210 lb (95 kg) | Fr | Blair Academy | Somerset, NJ |
| G | 4 | Joe Bamisile | 6 ft 4 in (1.93 m) | 194 lb (88 kg) | Jr | George Washington | Chesterfield, VA |
| F | 10 | Sam Godwin | 6 ft 10 in (2.08 m) | 226 lb (103 kg) | Jr | Wofford | Ada, OK |
| F | 11 | Yaya Keita | 6 ft 9 in (2.06 m) | 240 lb (109 kg) | So | Missouri | St. Louis, MO |
| G | 12 | Milos Uzan | 6 ft 4 in (1.93 m) | 183 lb (83 kg) | Fr | Desert Pines | Las Vegas, NV |
| G | 14 | Bijan Cortes | 6 ft 3 in (1.91 m) | 194 lb (88 kg) | So | Kingfisher | Kingfisher, OK |
| G | 22 | C. J. Noland | 6 ft 2 in (1.88 m) | 229 lb (104 kg) | So | Waxahachie | Waxahachie, TX |
| G | 25 | Grant Sherfield | 6 ft 2 in (1.88 m) | 228 lb (103 kg) | Sr | Nevada | Fort Worth, TX |
| G | 30 | Jake Moser (W) | 6 ft 3 in (1.91 m) | 187 lb (85 kg) | So | Loyola Academy | Norman, OK |
| F | 34 | Jacob Groves | 6 ft 9 in (2.06 m) | 216 lb (98 kg) | Sr | Eastern Washington | Spokane, WA |
| F/C | 35 | Tanner Groves | 6 ft 10 in (2.08 m) | 235 lb (107 kg) | GS | Eastern Washington | Spokane, WA |
| G | 44 | Blake Seacat (W) | 6 ft 4 in (1.93 m) | 208 lb (94 kg) | Sr | Jenks | Tulsa, OK |
| C | 45 | Luke Northweather | 6 ft 11 in (2.11 m) | 232 lb (105 kg) | Fr | Blair Oaks | Jefferson, MO |

Head coach

- Porter Moser (Creighton)

Assistant coach(es)

- Emanuel Dildy (Eastern Illinois)
- Ryan Humphrey (Notre Dame)

Legend

- (C) Team captain
- (S) Suspended
- (I) Ineligible
- (W) Walk-on
- Injured
- Current redshirt

Roster
Last update: April 21, 2021

== Schedule and results ==
| Date time, TV | Rank^{#} | Opponent^{#} | Result | Record | High points | High rebounds | High assists | Site (attendance) city, state |
Exhibition
| October 25, 2022*; 7:00 p.m., ESPN+ | | Oklahoma City | W 89–53 | | 14 – Sherfield | 11 – T. Groves | 4 – Sherfield | Lloyd Noble Center (2,613); Norman, OK |
Regular season
| November 7, 2022*; 7:00 p.m., ESPN+ | | Sam Houston | L 51–52 | 0–1 | 14 – Sherfield | 9 – T. Groves | 2 – Sherfield | Lloyd Noble Center (6,198); Norman, OK |
| November 11, 2022*; 7:00 p.m., ESPN+ | | Arkansas–Pine Bluff | W 66–58 | 1–1 | 22 – Hill | 11 – T. Groves | 4 – T. Groves | Lloyd Noble Center (4,908); Norman, OK |
| November 15, 2022*; 7:00 p.m., ESPN+ | | UNC Wilmington | W 74–53 | 2–1 | 15 – Tied | 9 – Tied | 6 – Sherfield | Lloyd Noble Center (4,819); Norman, OK |
| November 18, 2022*; 7:00 p.m., ESPN+ | | South Alabama | W 64–60 | 3–1 | 17 – Sherfield | 11 – T. Groves | 8 – Sherfield | Lloyd Noble Center (5,403); Norman, OK |
| November 24, 2022*; 4:00 p.m., ESPN | | vs. Nebraska; ESPN Events Invitational Quarterfinals | W 69–56 | 4–1 | 17 – T. Groves | 6 – T. Groves | 8 – Sherfield | State Farm Field House (1,621); Orlando, FL |
| November 25, 2022*; 7:00 p.m., ESPN2 | | vs. Seton Hall; ESPN Events Invitational semifinals | W 77–64 | 5–1 | 25 – Sherfield | 6 – T. Groves | 5 – Uzan | State Farm Field House (1,396); Orlando, FL |
| November 27, 2022*; 12:30 p.m., ESPN | | vs. Ole Miss; ESPN Events Invitational championship | W 59–55 | 6–1 | 12 – Sherfield | 6 – Godwin | 5 – Sherfield | State Farm Field House (1,014); Orlando, FL |
| December 3, 2022*; 11:30 a.m., CBS | | at Villanova; Big East–Big 12 Battle | L 66–70 | 6–2 | 21 – Sherfield | 7 – T. Groves | 5 – T. Groves | Wells Fargo Center (17,079); Philadelphia, PA |
| December 6, 2022*; 7:00 p.m., ESPN+ | | Kansas City | W 75–53 | 7–2 | 24 – Sherfield | 5 – Tied | 5 – Uzan | Lloyd Noble Center (4,863); Norman, OK |
| December 10, 2022*; 12:00 p.m., ESPN2 | | vs. No. 9 Arkansas; The Crimson and Cardinal Classic | L 78–88 | 7–3 | 23 – Sherfield | 5 – Tied | 5 – Uzan | BOK Center (14,201); Tulsa, OK |
| December 17, 2022*; 2:00 p.m., ESPN+ | | Central Arkansas | W 87–66 | 8–3 | 26 – J. Groves | 7 – T. Groves | 9 – Uzan | Lloyd Noble Center (4,559); Norman, OK |
| December 20, 2022*; 8:30 p.m., ESPN2 | | vs. Florida; Jumpman Invitational | W 62–53 | 9–3 | 22 – Sherfield | 12 – Hill | 5 – Uzan | Spectrum Center (8,745); Charlotte, NC |
| December 31, 2022; 1:00 p.m., ESPN+ | | No. 6 Texas | L 69–70 | 9–4 (0–1) | 22 – Sherfield | 7 – T. Groves | 5 – Uzan | Lloyd Noble Center (10,009); Norman, OK |
| January 4, 2023; 6:00 p.m., ESPN2 | | No. 25 Iowa State | L 60–63 | 9–5 (0–2) | 16 – Hill | 8 – T. Groves | 4 – Uzan | Lloyd Noble Center (4,758); Norman, OK |
| January 7, 2023; 6:00 p.m., ESPN+ | | at Texas Tech | W 68–63 ^{OT} | 10–5 (1–2) | 18 – Tied | 10 – T. Groves | 5 – Sherfield | United Supermarkets Arena (14,082); Lubbock, TX |
| January 10, 2023; 8:00 p.m., ESPN2 | | at No. 2 Kansas | L 75–79 | 10–6 (1–3) | 25 – Sherfield | 10 – T. Groves | 2 – Cortes | Allen Fieldhouse (16,300); Lawrence, KS |
| January 14, 2023; 11:00 a.m., ESPN2 | | West Virginia | W 77–76 | 11–6 (2–3) | 22 – Sherfield | 9 – Uzan | 5 – Tied | Lloyd Noble Center (7,756); Norman, OK |
| January 18, 2023; 8:00 p.m., ESPNU | | at Oklahoma State; Bedlam Series | L 56–72 | 11–7 (2–4) | 15 – Sherfield | 11 – T. Groves | 4 – Sherfield | Gallagher-Iba Arena (10,789); Stillwater, OK |
| January 21, 2023; 3:00 p.m., ESPN2 | | No. 21 Baylor | L 60–62 | 11–8 (2–5) | 17 – Hill | 9 – Tied | 4 – Tied | Lloyd Noble Center (8,808); Norman, OK |
| January 24, 2023; 7:00 p.m., ESPN+ | | at No. 11 TCU | L 52–79 | 11–9 (2–6) | 11 – Noland | 7 – Godwin | 6 – Cortes | Schollmaier Arena (8,145); Fort Worth, TX |
| January 28, 2023*; 1:00 p.m., ESPN | | No. 2 Alabama; Big 12/SEC Challenge | W 93–69 | 12–9 | 30 – Sherfield | 12 – T. Groves | 6 – Sherfield | Lloyd Noble Center (10,869); Norman, OK |
| February 1, 2023; 8:00 p.m., ESPN2 | | Oklahoma State; Bedlam Series | L 61–71 | 12–10 (2–7) | 14 – Sherfield | 5 – Tied | 2 – Tied | Lloyd Noble Center (13,224); Norman, OK |
| February 4, 2023; 7:00 p.m., ESPN2 | | at West Virginia | L 61–93 | 12–11 (2–8) | 16 – Sherfield | 8 – Hill | 3 – Cortes | WVU Coliseum (14,022); Morgantown, WV |
| February 8, 2023; 8:00 p.m., ESPNU | | at No. 14 Baylor | L 72–82 | 12–12 (2–9) | 15 – Sherfield | 7 – Bamisile | 7 – Sherfield | Ferrell Center (9,861); Waco, TX |
| February 11, 2023; 12:00 p.m., CBS | | No. 9 Kansas | L 55–78 | 12–13 (2–10) | 14 – Hill | 6 – T. Groves | 2 – Tied | Lloyd Noble Center (9,418); Norman, OK |
| February 14, 2023; 8:00 p.m., ESPNU | | No. 12 Kansas State | W 79–65 | 13–13 (3–10) | 22 – Sherfield | 8 – Sherfield | 6 – Sherfield | Lloyd Noble Center (5,167); Norman, OK |
| February 18, 2023; 1:00 p.m., ESPN+ | | at No. 6 Texas | L 83–85 ^{OT} | 13–14 (3–11) | 18 – Sherfield | 6 – Tied | 4 – Tied | Moody Center (10,763); Austin, TX |
| February 21, 2023; 8:00 p.m., ESPN2 | | Texas Tech | L 63–74 | 13–15 (3–12) | 16 – T. Groves | 6 – T. Groves | 4 – Hill | Lloyd Noble Center (5,203); Norman, OK |
| February 25, 2023; 11:00 a.m., ESPNU | | at No. 23 Iowa State | W 61–50 | 14–15 (4–12) | 16 – J. Groves | 13 – T. Groves | 7 – Uzan | Hilton Coliseum (14,267); Ames, IA |
| March 1, 2023; 7:00 p.m., ESPN+ | | at No. 11 Kansas State | L 69–85 | 14–16 (4–13) | 20 – Uzan | 6 – Tied | 5 – Uzan | Bramlage Coliseum (11,000); Manhattan, KS |
| March 4, 2023; 2:00 p.m., ESPN+ | | No. 22 TCU | W 74–60 | 15–16 (5–13) | 23 – Groves | 11 – Hill | 4 – Hill | Lloyd Noble Center (7,711); Norman, OK |
Big 12 tournament
| March 8, 2023; 8:30 p.m., ESPNU | (10) | vs. (7) Oklahoma State; First round/Bedlam Series | L 49–57 | 15–17 | 13 – Groves | 12 – Groves | 3 – Uzan | T-Mobile Center (17,702); Kansas City, MO |
*Non-conference game. ^{#}Rankings from AP Poll. (#) Tournament seedings in parentheses. All times are in Central Time.
