= Grant Sherfield =

American basketball player (born 1999)

BC Vienna
- Position: Point guard

Personal information
- Born: October 29, 1999 (age 27) Wichita, Kansas, U.S.
- Listed height: 6 ft 2 in (1.88 m)
- Listed weight: 189 lb (86 kg)

Career information
- High school: North Crowley (Fort Worth, Texas); Sunrise Christian Academy (Bel Aire, Kansas)
- College: Wichita State (2019–2020); Nevada (2020–2022); Oklahoma (2022–2023)
- NBA draft: 2023: undrafted
- Playing career: 2023–present

Career history
- 2023: Metropolitans 92
- 2023–2024: Hapoel Be'er Sheva
- 2024: Rasta Vechta
- 2024–2025: Yalovaspor Basketbol
- 2025: Changsha Yongsheng
- 2025–2026: Löwen Braunschweig
- 2026: Trefl Sopot

Career highlights
- First-team All-Mountain West (2021); Third-team All-Mountain West (2022); Mountain West Newcomer of the Year (2021)

Grant Payne Sherfield (born October 29, 1999) is an American professional basketball player who currently plays for BC Vienna. He previously played for Trefl Sopot of the Polish Basketball League (PLK). He played college basketball for the Oklahoma Sooners, Wichita State Shockers and Nevada Wolf Pack.

== High school career ==
Sherfield attended North Crowley High School in Fort Worth, Texas. As a junior, he averaged 24.1 points, 4.2 assists and 3.6 rebounds per game, earning District 4-6A co-MVP and Offensive Player of the Year. For his senior season, Sherfield transferred to Sunrise Christian Academy in Bel Aire, Kansas. He averaged a team-high 15.6 points and led the program to its first GEICO Nationals appearance. He originally committed to playing college basketball for UCLA but reopened his recruitment after head coach Steve Alford was fired. Sherfield later committed to Wichita State over offers from Minnesota and Wake Forest, among others.

== College career ==
On December 29, 2019, Sherfield recorded a freshman season-high 15 points and 11 rebounds in an 84–66 win over Abilene Christian. As a freshman, he averaged 8.1 points and 2.9 assists per game, shooting 35 percent from the field.

Sherfield transferred to Nevada and was granted a waiver for immediate eligibility. He averaged 18.6 points, 6.1 assists, 3.7 rebounds and 1.6 steals per game as a sophomore. Sherfield was named to the First Team All-Mountain West as well as Mountain West Newcomer of the Year. On November 23, 2021, he scored a career-high 31 points and had six assists in an 88–69 win over George Mason. As a junior, he averaged 19.1 points, 6.4 assists and 4.2 rebounds per game. Sherfield was named to the Third Team All-Mountain West as a junior. On April 7, 2022, he declared for the 2022 NBA draft while maintaining his college eligibility. On April 15, he entered the transfer portal.

On May 24, 2022, Sherfield announced he was withdrawing from NBA draft and transferring to Oklahoma for his senior season.

== Professional career ==
=== Metropolitans 92 (2023) ===
On August 16, 2023, he signed with Metropolitans 92 of the French LNB Pro A.

=== Hapoel Be'er Sheva (2023–2024) ===
On summer 2023, he signed with Hapoel Be'er Sheva of the Israeli Basketball Premier League.

=== Rasta Vechta (2024) ===
On July 1, 2024, the current basketball champion league participant announced the signing from Grant Sheffield to Rasta Vechta of the Basketball Bundesliga.

=== Yalovaspor Basketbol (2024–2025) ===
On October 11, 2024, he signed with Yalovaspor Basketbol of the Basketbol Süper Ligi (BSL).

=== Basketball Löwen Braunschweig(2025–2026) ===
On September 8, 2025, he signed with Löwen Braunschweig of the Basketball Bundesliga.

=== Trefl Sopot (2026) ===
On March 24, 2026, he signed with Trefl Sopot of the Polish Basketball League (PLK).

== Career statistics ==
Legend
GP	Games played	GS	Games started	MPG	Minutes per game
FG%	Field goal percentage	3P%	3-point field goal percentage	FT%	Free throw percentage
RPG	Rebounds per game	APG	Assists per game	SPG	Steals per game
BPG	Blocks per game	PPG	Points per game	**Bold**	Career high

=== College ===
Year	Team	GP	GS	MPG	FG%	3P%	FT%	RPG	APG	SPG	BPG	PPG
2019–20	Wichita State	30	12	25.1	.353	.304	.744	3.0	2.9	.8	**.1**	8.1
2020–21	Nevada	26	26	34.7	.433	.367	.855	3.7	6.1	**1.6**	.0	18.6
2021–22	Nevada	28	28	**35.7**	**.435**	.333	**.871**	**4.2**	**6.4**	.6	.0	**19.1**
2022–23	Oklahoma	**32**	**32**	33.7	.403	**.394**	.863	2.5	3.3	.7	.0	15.9
Career		116	98	32.2	.413	.360	.840	3.3	4.6	.9	.0	15.2
