= Hendrickson High School =

Location
- 19201 Colorado Sand Dr. Pflugerville, Travis, Texas 78660; United States; 30.4647°N 97.5881°W

Information
- School type: Public
- Motto: Attitude Is A Choice
- Established: 2003
- School district: Pflugerville Independent School District
- Superintendent: Quintin Shepherd
- Principal: Michael Grebb
- Teaching staff: 132.10 (FTE)
- Grades: 9–12
- Student to teacher ratio: 15.94
- Colors: Navy, Silver
- Slogan: Where the Hawks Soar!
- Sports: Football, Volleyball, Wrestling, Golf, Tennis, Swimming, Basketball, Soccer, Baseball, Softball
- Mascot: Hawk
- Newspaper: The Hawk
- Yearbook: The Talon
- Website: hhs.pfisd.net

Hendrickson High School is a high school in the city of Pflugerville, Travis County, Texas, United States. It is operated by the Pflugerville Independent School District and is named after Pflugerville educator and civil servant Robert E. Hendrickson.

== Notable alumni ==
- Dylan Disu, basketball player
- Samaje Perine, American football running back
- Hope Trautwein, American college softball pitcher
- Rene Otero′, NSDA National Champion, Foreign Extemporaneous Speaking and featured in the documentary "Boys State" which won numerous awards, including a Primetime Creative Arts Emmy Award.
