= Marcus Carr =

Canadian basketball player (born 1999)

- Carr with Virtus Bologna in 2026

No. 2 – Virtus Bologna
- Position: Point guard
- League: LBA; EuroLeague

Personal information
- Born: June 6, 1999 (age 27) Toronto, Ontario, Canada
- Listed height: 6 ft 2 in (1.88 m)
- Listed weight: 190 lb (86 kg)

Career information
- High school: St. Michael's College (Toronto, Ontario); Montverde Academy (Montverde, Florida)
- College: Pittsburgh (2017–2018); Minnesota (2019–2021); Texas (2021–2023)
- NBA draft: 2023: undrafted
- Playing career: 2023–present

Career history
- 2023: Aris Thessaloniki
- 2023–2024: Bnei Herzliya
- 2024: Vancouver Bandits
- 2024–2025: Hapoel Galil Elyon
- 2025: Brampton Honey Badgers
- 2025–2026: Würzburg Baskets
- 2026–present: Virtus Bologna

Career highlights
- First-team All-Big 12 (2023); Third-team All-Big 12 (2022); Second-team All-Big Ten – Media (2021); Third-team All-Big Ten – Coaches (2021); Third-team All-Big Ten – Media (2020)
Medals
Men's basketball
Representing Canada
FIBA Americas Under-16 Championship
Silver medal – second place	2015 Argentina	Team

Marcus Joshua Carr (born June 6, 1999) is a Canadian professional basketball player for Virtus Bologna of the Lega Basket Serie A (LBA) and the EuroLeague. He played college basketball for the Pittsburgh Panthers, the Minnesota Golden Gophers, and the Texas Longhorns.

== High school career ==
In his first two years of high school, Carr played for St. Michael's College School in Toronto. As a freshman, he led his team to the quarterfinals of the Ontario Federation of School Athletic Associations (OFSAA) tournament. Carr scored as many as 49 points in a single game. In 2015, he won the Ontario All-Catholic Classic and was named most valuable player (MVP) after scoring 16 points in the final. As a sophomore, Carr averaged 16 points, four rebounds and five assists per game. He lost only one game in the season, to Roman Catholic High School, and won the OFSAA title.

Before his junior year, Carr transferred to Montverde Academy, a school in Montverde, Florida with a renowned basketball program. He was drawn to Montverde because his grandmother lived in Orlando, Florida. However, Carr missed his entire junior season with a torn ACL. As a senior, he averaged 9.1 points, 3.5 rebounds and 3.7 assists per game, playing on the same team as the top recruit in the 2018 class, RJ Barrett. His team, which was ranked among the best in the country, achieved a 26–5 record and a runners-up finish at High School Nationals. At the end of the season, he played in the BioSteel All-Canadian Game. Carr was a three-star recruit and chose to play for Pittsburgh over offers from Cincinnati, Houston and Virginia Tech, among others. He was considered a three-star recruit and was ranked the 146th best prospect in his class.

== College career ==
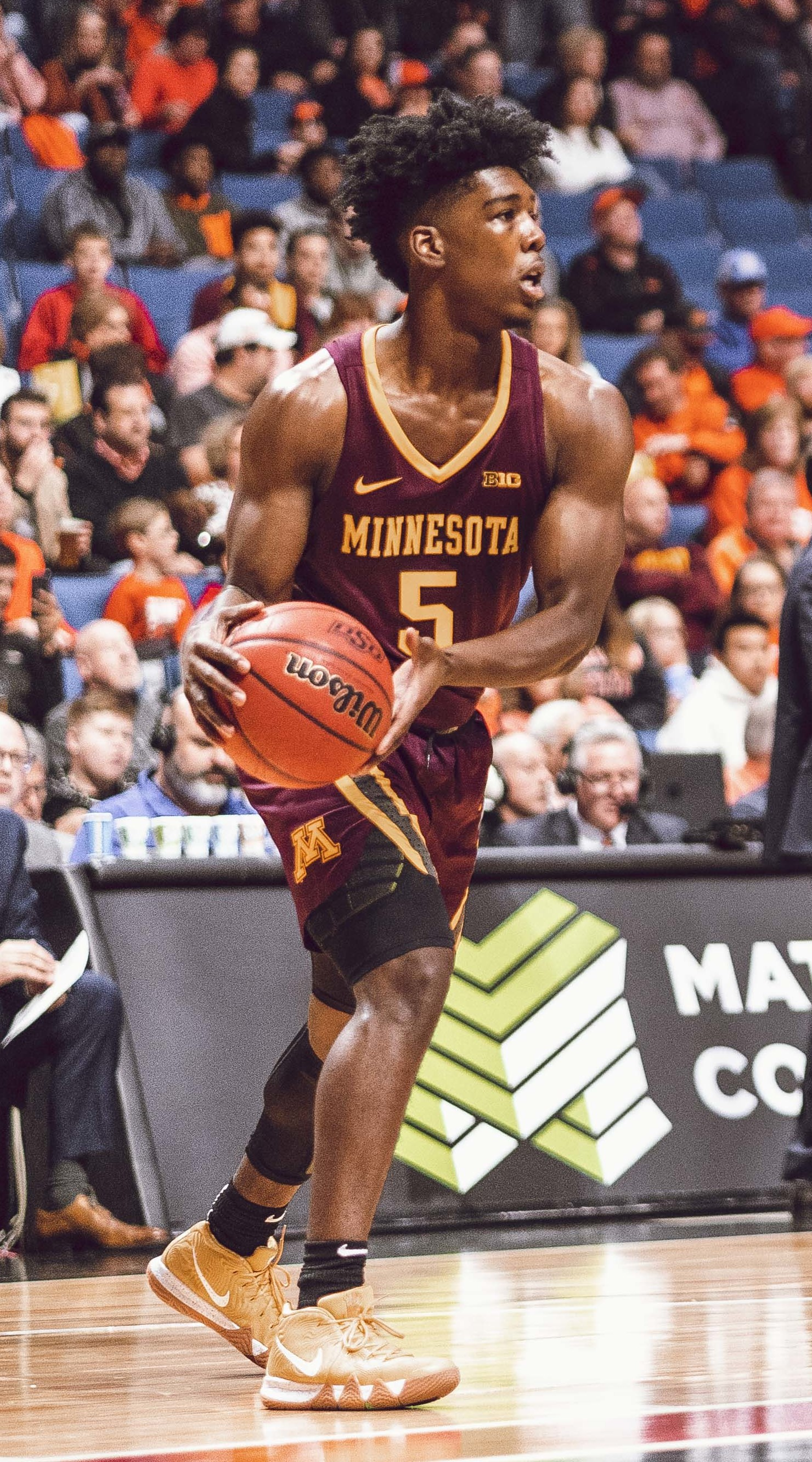
Carr with Minnesota in 2019

Carr began his collegiate career at the University of Pittsburgh. As a true freshman, he played in all 32 of Pitt's games with 27 starts and averaged 10.0 points, 4.0 assists and 2.8 rebounds per game. Carr announced that he would be leaving the program after head coach Kevin Stallings was fired at the end of the season in which the Panthers finished a disappointing 8–24. Carr committed to transfer to the University of Minnesota.

Carr sat out one year due to NCAA transfer rules after his request for a waiver that would allow him to play immediately was denied. During the year off, he impersonated opposing guards like Carsen Edwards on the scout team. Carr scored 35 points on December 15, 2019 in a 84–71 win over third-ranked Ohio State. On January 15, 2020, Carr scored 27 points in a 75–69 win against Penn State. At the close of the regular season, Carr was named third-team All-Big Ten by the media and was honorable mention all-conference according to the coaches. He averaged 15.4 points, 5.3 rebounds and 6.5 assists per game, setting a school single-season record with 207 assists. After the season, Carr declared for the 2020 NBA draft but did not sign with an agent. On August 1, he announced that he would withdraw from the draft and return to Minnesota for his junior season.

In his junior season debut on November 25, 2020, Carr recorded 35 points, seven rebounds and four assists in a 99–69 win over Green Bay. On February 27, 2021, he scored 41 points in a 78–74 loss to Nebraska. Carr earned third-team All-Big Ten honors as a junior after averaging 19.4 points, 4.0 rebounds and 4.9 assists per game. Following the season, he transferred to Texas. Carr was named third-team All-Big 12 as a senior. He returned for his final season of eligibility and surpassed the 2,000 point mark early in the season.

In his final season of eligibility, Carr started in all 38 of the games he played and averaged 15.9 points, 3.0 rebounds, and 4.1 assists per game in 33.9 minutes a game. Carr was named as part of the All-Big 12 Preseason Team, All-Big 12 First-Team, and Big 12 All-Tournament Team. At the end of the season, Carr declared for the NBA Draft.

== Professional career ==
=== Phoenix Suns (2023) ===
After going undrafted in the NBA draft, Carr signed with the Phoenix Suns as an undrafted free agent. Carr played 4 games for the Suns in the 2023 Summer League. He averaged 1.5 points, 1.5 rebounds, and 1.8 assists per game in 11.5 minutes a game.

=== Aris Thessaloniki (2023) ===
On August 3, 2023, Carr signed his first professional contract overseas with historic Greek club Aris Thessaloniki. Carr appeared in 10 games with Aris before parting ways in December 2023. He averaged 7.4 points, 1.4 rebounds, and 1.8 assists per contest in 22.4 minutes a game.

=== Bnei Herzliya (2023–24) ===
On December 14, 2023, Carr signed with Bnei Herzliya of the Israeli Basketball Premier League. He played and started in all 15 games, averaging 12.1 points, 2.9 rebounds, and 3.3 assists per game.

=== Vancouver Bandits (2024) ===
On July 16, 2024, Carr signed with the Vancouver Bandits of the Canadian Elite Basketball League. for the remainder of the 2024 CEBL season. He played in six games, averaging 6.7 points, 1.7 rebounds, and 1.2 assists per game.

=== Galil Elion (2024-25) ===
On July 16, 2024, Carr signed with Hapoel Nofar Energy Galil Elion of the Ligat Winner Sal (Israeli Basketball Premier League). He played 27 games, averaging 15.7 points, 4.0 rebounds, and 5.1 assists per game.

=== Brampton Honey Badgers (2025) ===
On June 17, 2025, Carr signed with the Brampton Honey Badgers of the Canadian Elite Basketball League for the remainder of the 2025 CEBL season. He played in nine games, averaging 13.7 points, 2.6 rebounds, and 6.6 assists per game.

=== Wurzburg Baskets (2025–2026) ===
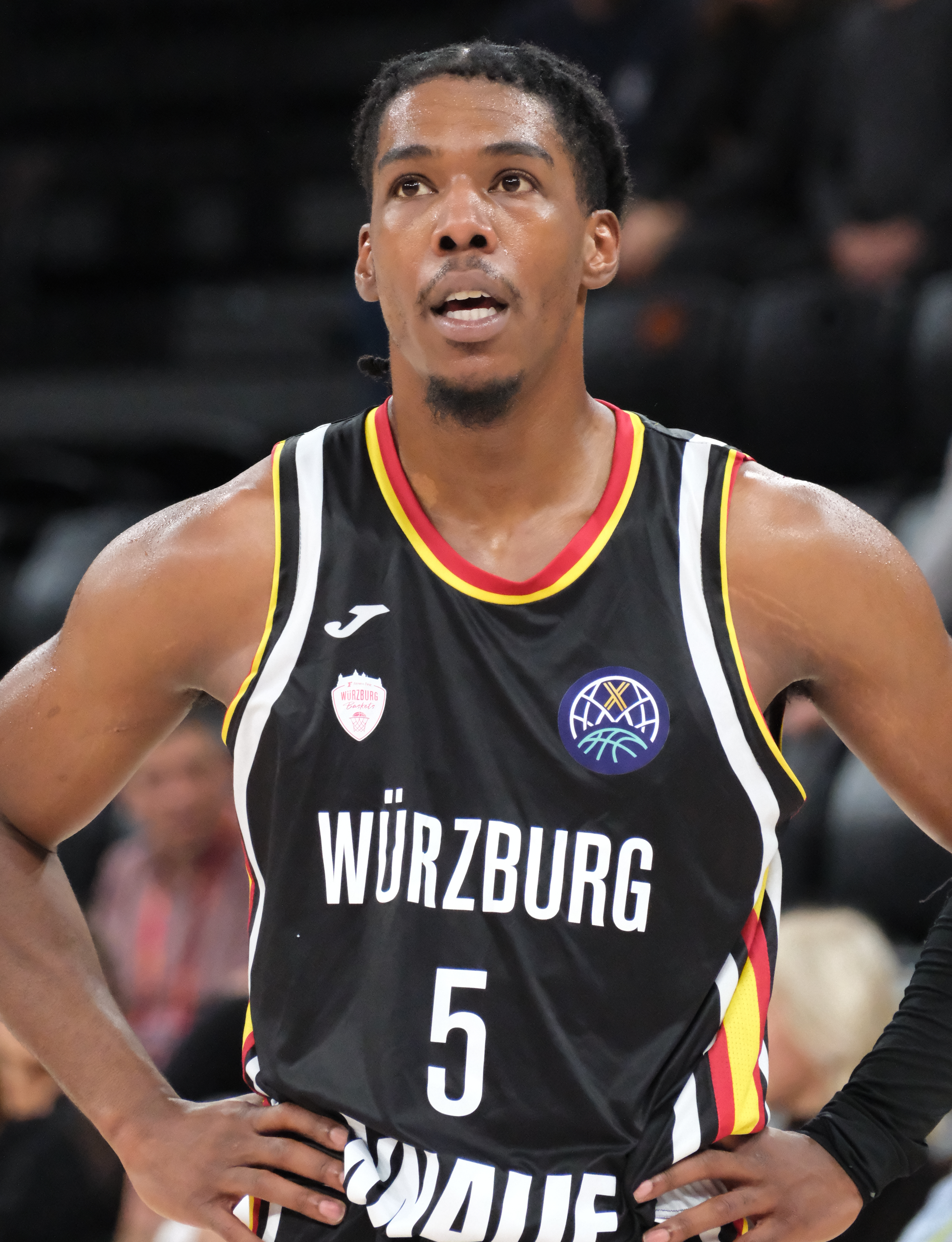
Carr with Würzburg Baskets in 2025

On July 9, 2025, Carr signed with Würzburg Baskets of the Basketball Bundesliga (BBL). In the 2025–26 BBL season, he played in 37 games, averaging 16.7 points, 2.7 rebounds, and 5.6 assists per game.

=== Virtus Bologna (2026–present) ===
On July 6, 2026, Carr signed with Virtus Bologna of the Italian Lega Basket Serie A (LBA) and EuroLeague.

== National team career ==
Carr played for Canada at the 2015 FIBA Americas Under-16 Championship in Bahía Blanca, Argentina. In four games, he averaged 6.2 points and 2.8 rebounds per game, helping his team to a silver medal finish. After recovering from a major knee injury, Carr was not invited to training camp for the 2016 FIBA Under-17 World Championship.

== Career statistics ==
Legend
GP	Games played	GS	Games started	MPG	Minutes per game
FG%	Field goal percentage	3P%	3-point field goal percentage	FT%	Free throw percentage
RPG	Rebounds per game	APG	Assists per game	SPG	Steals per game
BPG	Blocks per game	PPG	Points per game	**Bold**	Career high

=== Professional ===
Year	Team	GP	GS	MPG	FG%	3P%	FT%	RPG	APG	SPG	BPG	PPG
2023–24	Aris	11	4	22.6	.309	.171	**.913**	1.9	1.3	**1.0**	0.1	7.7
2023–24	Aris	10	7	22.4	.395	.105	.800	1.5	1.8	0.5	0.0	7.4
2024	Vancouver Bandits	6	0	13.3	.444	.364	.500	1.7	1.2	0.8	0.2	6.7
2023–24	Bnei Herzliya	15	15	27.9	.414	.347	.830	2.9	3.3	0.9	0.1	12.1
2024–25	Galil Elyon	27	26	33.1	.408	.363	.837	4.0	5.1	1.0	0.0	15.7
2025	Brampton Honey Badgers	9	4	30.8	.416	.341	.824	2.6	6.6	1.7	0.1	13.7
2025–26	Würzburg Baskets	37	32	28.8	.401	.324	.859	2.7	5.6	0.8	0.0	16.7

=== College ===
Year	Team	GP	GS	MPG	FG%	3P%	FT%	RPG	APG	SPG	BPG	PPG
2017–18	Pittsburgh	32	27	28.6	.396	.333	**.818**	2.8	4.0	0.6	**0.1**	10.0
2018–19	Minnesota	Redshirt										
2019–20	Minnesota	31	31	**36.8**	.393	.361	.700	**5.3**	**6.5**	0.9	**0.1**	15.4
2020–21	Minnesota	29	29	35.8	.385	.317	.799	4.0	4.9	1.3	**0.1**	**19.4**
2021–22	Texas	34	32	30.9	.394	.338	.769	1.9	3.4	0.9	**0.1**	11.4
2022–23	Texas	**38**	**38**	33.9	**.428**	**.368**	.772	3.0	4.1	**1.6**	**0.1**	15.9
Career		164	157	33.1	.400	.345	.768	3.3	4.6	1.1	0.1	14.3

== Personal life ==
Carr's older brother, Duane Notice, played college basketball for South Carolina and helped the Gamecocks reach the final four round of the 2017 NCAA tournament and previously played for the Raptors 905 in the NBA G-League and the Hamilton Honeybadgers (now Brampton) in the CEBL.
