= Dylan Disu =

American basketball player (born 2000)

Free agent
- Position: Center / power forward

Personal information
- Born: November 12, 2000 (age 26) Austin, Texas, U.S.
- Listed height: 6 ft 9 in (2.06 m)
- Listed weight: 225 lb (102 kg)

Career information
- High school: Hendrickson (Pflugerville, Texas)
- College: Vanderbilt (2019–2021); Texas (2021–2024)
- NBA draft: 2024: undrafted
- Playing career: 2024–present

Career history
- 2024–2025: Raptors 905

Career highlights
- First-team All-Big 12 (2024); Big 12 Most Improved Player (2024); Big 12 Tournament Most Outstanding Player (2023); Big 12 All-Tournament Team (2023)
- Stats at NBA.com
- Stats at Basketball Reference

Dylan Akeem Disu (born November 12, 2000) is an American professional basketball player who last played for Raptors 905 of the NBA G League. He played college basketball for the Vanderbilt Commodores and Texas Longhorns.

== High school career ==
Disu played basketball for Hendrickson High School in Pflugerville, Texas. He led his team to back-to-back District 13-6A titles. As a senior, Disu averaged 23.4 points and 10.1 rebounds per game, earning district MVP honors. He scored a school-record 51 points against Leander High School. A four-star recruit, Disu committed to playing college basketball for Vanderbilt over offers from SMU, Georgia Tech, Texas A&M and Illinois, among others.

== College career ==
As a freshman at Vanderbilt, Disu averaged 7.4 points and 5.7 rebounds per game. On February 17, 2021, he posted career-highs of 29 points and 16 rebounds in an 82–78 loss to Kentucky. One week later, head coach Jerry Stackhouse announced that Disu would miss the rest of the season with a knee injury.

As a sophomore, Disu averaged 15 points and 9.2 rebounds per game, leading the Southeastern Conference (SEC) in rebounding prior to his injury. He was named SEC Scholar-Athlete of the Year. After the season, Disu transferred to Texas, which he described as his "dream school growing up."

As a junior, Disu came off the bench and averaged 3.7 points, 3.2 rebounds, 0.4 assists per game in 10.9 minutes a game.

As a senior, Disu started in all 36 of the games he played. He averaged 8.8 points, 4.4 rebounds, and 1.0 assist per game in 19 minutes a game. Disu played a crucial part in the Longhorn's post-season, averaging 17.8 points, 9 rebounds, and 1.2 assists per game in the 5 postseason games, consisting of 3 Big 12 Championship games and 2 NCAA Tournament games and excluding the Sweet 16 game against Xavier where Disu only played 2 minutes due to an injury. Disu won the Big 12 Tournament Most Outstanding Player award and Big 12 All-Tournament Team award.

After the end of the 2022-23 season, Disu decided to use his additional year of eligibility granted from COVID-19 and returned to Texas for his final year. Disu was only able to play in 25 games due to injuries, but left a significant impact on the success of the team as he averaged 15.5 points, 5 rebounds, and 1.5 assists per game. Disu was named as part of the All-Big 12 First-Team and won the Big 12 Most Improved Player award. At the end of the 2023-24 season, Disu declared for the NBA Draft.

== Professional career ==
=== Raptors 905 (2024–2025) ===
After going undrafted in the 2024 NBA draft, Disu joined the Toronto Raptors for the 2024 NBA Summer League. On September 23, 2024, he signed with the team, but was waived the same day. On October 28, he joined Raptors 905. After appearing in 17 games, including seven starts, through the tip-off tournament and regular season, Disu missed the remainder of the 2024-25 season due to a left foot strain and multiple tendon tenosynovitis. At the end of season, Disu became a free agent.

== Career statistics ==
Legend
GP	Games played	GS	Games started	MPG	Minutes per game
FG%	Field goal percentage	3P%	3-point field goal percentage	FT%	Free throw percentage
RPG	Rebounds per game	APG	Assists per game	SPG	Steals per game
BPG	Blocks per game	PPG	Points per game	**Bold**	Career high

=== Professional ===
Year	Team	GP	GS	MPG	FG%	3P%	FT%	RPG	APG	SPG	BPG	PPG
2024-25	Raptors 905	2	-	16.7	.400	.286	-	2.5	1.0	0.5	0.5	5.0

=== College ===
Year	Team	GP	GS	MPG	FG%	3P%	FT%	RPG	APG	SPG	BPG	PPG
2019–20	Vanderbilt	32	31	27.0	.358	.295	.548	5.7	1.0	1.1	0.9	7.4
2020–21	Vanderbilt	17	17	**31.6**	**.492**	.369	.736	**9.2**	1.4	1.1	1.2	15.0
2021–22	Texas	26	0	10.9	.466	.133	**.813**	3.2	0.4	0.4	0.8	3.7
2022–23	Texas	**36**	**36**	19.0	.613	.313	.778	4.4	1.0	0.6	**1.3**	8.8
2023–24	Texas	25	20	25.8	.465	**.451**	.812	5.0	**1.5**	**1.3**	1.1	**15.5**
Career		136	104	22.2	.477	.340	.743	5.2	1.0	0.9	1.1	9.5
