= Longhorn Network =

Former American sports network

- Country: United States
- Broadcast area: Texas; Nationwide (via satellite)
- Headquarters: Austin, Texas

Programming
- Language: English
- Picture format: 720p (HD), 480i (SD)

Ownership
- Owner: University of Texas at Austin; ESPN Inc. Learfield
- Sister channels: ESPN; ESPNU; ACC Network; SEC Network

History
- Launched: August 26, 2011; 15 years ago
- Closed: June 30, 2024; 2 years ago
- Replaced by: SEC Network

Longhorn Network (LHN) was an American regional sports network owned as a joint venture between The University of Texas at Austin, ESPN and Learfield (formerly IMG College), and was operated by ESPN (itself owned jointly by The Walt Disney Company, Hearst Communications, and the National Football League). The network, which launched on August 26, 2011, focused on the Texas Longhorns varsity sports teams of the University of Texas at Austin, and broadcast programs such as pre- and post-game shows, event replays, coach's shows, original series and documentaries chronicling the Longhorns and their history, and live coverage of Longhorns events not carried by other Big 12 Conference media partners.

Longhorn Network was announced by ESPN on January 19, 2011. The name and logo were revealed during the Longhorns' spring football game on April 3, 2011. It held the third-tier media rights to the Longhorns, and featured events from 20 different sports involving the Texas Longhorns athletics department, along with original and historical programming. The network also featured academic and cultural content from the UT Austin campus.

Due to the Longhorns' move from the Big 12 Conference (whose media rights structure allowed for the arrangement Longhorn Network was established under) on July 1, 2024 to the SEC (whose media rights are fully owned by ESPN, with supplemental programming carried via its own cable channel SEC Network), the network was closed on June 30, 2024. The LHN branding was repurposed for a school-run digital platform that carries similar content, as well as archived original programming from the ESPN-run channel.

== Carriage ==
The first national provider to carry the Longhorn Network was fiber optic television service Verizon FiOS, which announced a deal to carry the network in August 2011. On August 31, 2012, the network began to be carried on AT&T U-verse. Several smaller cable providers throughout Texas have also added the channel – namely Consolidated Communications, Bay City Cablevision, Mid-Coast Cablevision, Texas Mid-Gulf Cablevision, En-Touch Systems, E-Tex Communications and Grande Communications.

The only major provider serving Texas that did not carry the Longhorn Network was Comcast.

=== Carriage agreements ===
==== 2012 ====
On October 4, 2012, New York-based Cablevision Systems Corporation began carrying LHN on its systems in the Western United States. Its New York City area systems were not included in the deal. Two months later on December 12, Cox Communications announced a comprehensive long-term distribution agreement that included adding the Longhorn Network to its systems in Arkansas, Kansas, Louisiana and Oklahoma. On December 31, 2012, Charter Communications announced that it would add LHN as part of a wide-range long-term carriage deal with ESPN and The Walt Disney Company. Charter also took over Cablevision's western systems in the first quarter of 2013 and maintained the rights agreed to by Cablevision for LHN. It is available on its systems in Arkansas, Louisiana, New Mexico, Texas and Virginia.

==== 2013 ====
On August 8, 2013, Time Warner Cable announced that it would begin carrying LHN in its Texas service areas.

==== 2014 ====
On March 3, 2014, The Walt Disney Company and Dish Network announced a deal to carry the Longhorn Network as part of a new long-term, wide-ranging distribution agreement. The channel became available on the satellite provider on May 28 of that year. On December 23, 2014, DirecTV announced a long-term, wide-ranging distribution agreement with Disney that included the carriage of Longhorn Network.

==== 2015 ====
Longhorn Network launched on DirecTV on January 21, 2015 along with Fusion. It became available on regional sports network on the Choice package in the Southwestern United States and on the Sports Pack everywhere else.

==== 2017 ====
In May 2017, DirecTV Now reduced the presence for the Longhorn Network from nationwide coverage to solely to the Big 12 territory (DirecTV's satellite service continued to carry LHN nationally).

=== Online presence ===
Although the Longhorn Network had an internet presence hosted by ESPN, it functioned as a TV Everywhere service that was unavailable to subscribers unless their cable and internet service provider carried the network, with further geographical restrictions (usually confined to the states contained within the Big 12 Conference); ESPN.com and the ESPN App enforced the same restrictions in carrying the network. Patrick Ryan, Policy Counsel, Open Internet at Google pointed out that the reach of LHN as of September 2012 was about 10 million potential viewers, whereas if it were online, it could reach 230 million viewers in the U.S., or as many as 2 billion potential viewers.

== Closedown ==
With UT–Austin's move to the SEC in 2024, athletic director Chris Del Conte stated in May 2022 that Longhorn Network would most likely be shut down, referring to it tongue-in-cheek as "the History channel". In August 2022, ESPN president of programming Burke Magnus confirmed that Longhorn Network's programming would be "folded" into SEC Network upon the completion of the transfer of UT–Austin and the University of Oklahoma into the SEC.

Its last live sporting event was the Longhorns baseball team's regular season finale against Kansas on May 18, 2024. The network closed on June 30, 2024 at 5 p.m. CT, preceded by a marathon of its documentary miniseries 05 (which profiled the Longhorns football team's 2005 national championship run) and a staff roll. At that time, SEC Network broadcast a special edition of SEC Nation from the UT–Austin campus, as part of programming marking the official move of the Longhorns and Oklahoma Sooners from the Big 12 to the SEC.

On July 1, the Longhorn Network brand was repurposed for a free school-run digital platform, which carries similar team content such as coach's shows, post-game press conferences, and team radio broadcasts. It also maintains the library of Longhorn Network's past original programming.

== Programming ==
=== Regular programming ===
- Longhorn Extra: This Week – A weekly broadcast that covered news on the university's 20 varsity teams.
- Rewind with Steve Sarkisian – A Monday program that featured analysis from the football coach of the past weekend's game.
- Texas All Access – A weekly insider show about the Longhorns sports teams, focusing on the football team during the fall months.
- Game Plan with Tom Herman – A Thursday night preview show to the upcoming weekend's football game.
- Texas GameDay – A two-hour pre-game show, similar in format to ESPN's College GameDay, which was broadcast from the site of Darrell K Royal–Texas Memorial Stadium for home games and the Austin-based network studio for road games.
- Texas GameDay Final – A 90-minute post-game show, similar in format to ESPN's College Football Final, on site at Darrell K Royal–Texas Memorial Stadium for home games and the Austin-based network studio for road games.
- Longhorn Legends – A roundtable discussion program with Longhorns football coach Mack Brown and a rotating selection of former players.
- The Season: 2005 Texas Longhorns – An in-depth review of the 2005 Longhorns football season, during which the team earned its fourth national championship in the university's history.
- Texas' Greatest Games – A Top 10 countdown of what is considered to be the program's best football games.
- Texas' Greatest Athletes – A program that covered those who are considered to be the best athletes (across all sports) that the school has produced.
- Traditions – A look into how some of the university's historical sports traditions started.

=== Sports ===
The first live sports event broadcast on the network aired on the date of its launch, the women's volleyball team's 2011 season opener against the Pepperdine Waves. The first live football game telecast on the network aired on September 3, 2011, in which the Longhorns played against the Rice Owls. The Longhorn Network would expand its sports coverage to include five UTSA Roadrunners football games to its schedule for sister campus University of Texas at San Antonio's inaugural football season, the first of which aired on September 10, 2011. The majority of the live events are handled by the Longhorn Network Operations department, which manages the crew that sets up the equipment used to air the event. Over 200 live events were managed by this department during the 2011–12 school year.

In 2015, Longhorn Network simulcast featured groups coverage of the Open Championship, which featured University of Texas golf alumnus Jordan Spieth. It also broadcast 44 hours of coverage from the 2015 Pan American Games in Toronto.

In February 2018, the network began to produce and carry coverage of women's softball games at UT's McCombs Field where the university mainly served as a host school for neutral-site series and games between northern teams (southern schools and domes regularly host the programs of northern schools in baseball and softball during the winter), allowing the schools to have full coverage of their games without having to take on additional travel and production costs for broadcasting their games.

== Controversies ==
=== High school football ===
From the initial announcement of the Longhorn Network, ESPN had made it known that it desired to broadcast up to 18 high school football games per season.

Texas A&M, due to what that university viewed as possible recruiting violations, cites the LHN as the reason for its decision to leave the Big 12 for the SEC in 2012. However, in 2022, R. Bowen Loftin, who was A&M's president when it joined the SEC, revealed that the decision to leave for the SEC had already been made no later than the summer of 2010, invalidating the previous claim—though he had also stated in a 2021 interview, ""When the LHN was announced, that just galvanized our former and current students. We went from 50-50 to 95-5 [in favor of the SEC] almost overnight."

Public high school athletics in Texas are governed by the University Interscholastic League (UIL), which is owned by The University of Texas at Austin. During an August 1, 2011, meeting of all Big 12 athletic directors, it was decided that the issue of airing high school football games on the LHN would be postponed for one year, allowing time for the NCAA to rule on the matter, though no high school games would be broadcast in that time. Ten days later, the NCAA ruled that no school or conference network would be permitted to broadcast high school sports or any other high school programming.

=== Big 12 Conference football ===
In addition to a non-conference game each season, ESPN desired to place a Big 12 Conference game on the Longhorn Network. At the same Big 12 meeting that discussed high school football telecasts, it was agreed upon that a conference game would be acceptable as long as both schools and the conference office approved the broadcast. It was reported that ESPN asked Texas Tech for permission to broadcast the team's November 5, 2011, game against the Longhorns on the network. ESPN told the university that the game would most likely not be carried on any of the ESPN family of networks, leaving a broadcast on the LHN as its only option. In return, ESPN promised to televise two non-conference football games over the next four seasons, televise some other non-football programming, $5 million cash, and help from the network to try to arrange a home-and-home series against a top BCS conference school. Texas Tech passed on the offer with the university's chancellor Kent Hance explaining that "I don't want a Tech fan to have to give one dime to the Longhorn Network". ESPN then contacted Oklahoma State about airing games on the network; that university also refused the invitation to appear on the network. Texas Athletics eventually announced that the Kansas Jayhawks had agreed to let its game against the Longhorns on October 29 air on LHN (the University of Kansas's third-tier media rights are also managed by LHN co-owner IMG College). The agreement allowed the Longhorn Network to be the national carrier of the game, except in Kansas markets, where the game was shown on broadcast television. ESPN revealed plans to broadcast the Texas Tech-Texas State game on the Longhorn Network in 2012, however Texas Tech threatened to drop the game in favor of an 11-game schedule, resulting in the game being removed from LHN's schedule.

In November 2012, ESPN syndicated a second feed of a Longhorn football home game against Iowa State to ABC-affiliated television stations across Iowa (including KETV in Omaha, Nebraska, which is owned by ESPN part-owner Hearst Corporation) to provide access to the game within that state. A secondary announcing team was used for the Iowa State feed. The same was done in September 2013 for a matchup against Ole Miss throughout the state of Mississippi. Mediacom eventually established an online/traditional network with Iowa State in their service area, Cyclones.tv, featuring university programming, along with any live games featuring Texas which are only available through Longhorn Network with Iowa State overlaying their own play-by-play and commentary, or producing their own telecast entirely.

=== Potential conflict of interest ===
In 2011 ESPN's financial stake in the LHN was accused of creating a potential conflict of interest. Some fear that ESPN's involvement in the network will inhibit journalistic integrity as that network has a financial interest in the success of the athletic programs at the University of Texas. Sports Illustrated writer Richard Deitsch wrote: "The network's existence... creates an impossible situation for ESPN's college football producers and reporters (plenty of whom care about reporting). For every story ESPN does on Texas and its opponents, they'll be skeptics wondering what the motivation was for the story."

In 2011 the stipulation included in the network's founding agreement that gives Texas the right to dismiss LHN announcers that do not "reflect the quality and reputation of UT" was questioned. An ESPN spokesperson addressed the situation by stating: "This is not common in ESPN agreements because this UT network is so unique/new for us ...The provision does not allow for random replacement of commentators or reaction to critical comments... it's more about potential situations where a commentator makes completely inappropriate comments or gets involved in inappropriate actions."
