= Chris Del Conte =

American college sports administrator (born 1968)

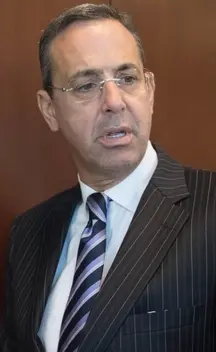
- Del Conte in 2017

Current position
- Title: Athletic director
- Team: Texas
- Conference: SEC

Biographical details
- Born: June 19, 1968 (age 58); Cuernavaca, Mexico
- Education: University of California, Santa Barbara (BA); Washington State University (M.Ed)

Playing career
- c. 1990: UC Santa Barbara

Administrative career (AD unless noted)
- 1994–1998: Cal Poly (assistant AD)
- 1998–1999: Washington State (assistant AD)
- 2000–2006: Arizona (senior associate AD)
- 2006–2009: Rice
- 2009–2017: TCU
- 2017–present: Texas

Chris Del Conte (born June 19, 1968) is an American college athletics administrator. He is the athletic director at the University of Texas at Austin, a position he has held since 2017. Del Conte served as the athletic director at Rice University from 2006 to 2009 and Texas Christian University (TCU) from 2009 to 2017. Under Del Conte, Texas has won the NACDA Directors' Cup as the nation's top performing athletic department in the 2020–21, 2021–22, 2023–24, 2024–25 and 2025-26 seasons.

== Early life and education ==
Del Conte was born on June 19, 1968, in Cuernavaca, Mexico. His parents met while working at an orphanage in Mexico and would later relocate the family to Taos, New Mexico, and start a children's home.

He is a graduate of the University of California, Santa Barbara, where he was a student-athlete in track and field and received a Bachelor of Arts degree in sociology. He also holds a master's degree in education, administration, and supervision from Washington State University.

== Career ==
Del Conte joined the Cal Poly Mustangs at 26 years old in September 1994 as an athletic development assistant. He also held the title of director of the Mustang Athletic Fund before departing in September 1998 for the Washington State Cougars.

Del Conte joined Washington State as the director of the Cougar Club. He was a top fundraiser for WSU athletics and was elevated to assistant athletic director of external operations before leaving to re-join former Cougar athletic director Jim Livengood at the Arizona Wildcats in a similar capacity in December 1999.

At the University of Arizona, Del Conte led fundraising for the Wildcats. He served as a member of the Wildcats' search committee for a new football head coach in December 2000 when Dick Tomey resigned. His fundraising efforts were credited with the athletics department becoming financially independent for the first time in the university's history. He was also instrumental in the creation of the $14 million Lynch Pavilion expansion at the McKale Center, and expansions to the men's and women's basketball practice facility and the Hillenbrand Aquatic Center.

On May 22, 2024, Del Conte won the Sports Business Journal's 2024 Athletic Director of the Year award.
