= 2022–23 Big 12 Conference men's basketball season =

2022–23 Big 12 Men's Basketball Season
- League: NCAA Division I
- Sport: Basketball
- Teams: 10
- TV partner(s): CBS, ESPN

Big 12 tournament
- Champions: Texas
- Finals MVP: Dylan Disu, Texas

Big 12 Basketball seasons
- ← 2021–22 2023–24 →

2022–23 Big 12 men's basketball standings
	Conf.				Overall
Team	W		L	PCT	W		L	PCT
No. 4 Kansas	13	–	5	.722	28	–	8	.778
No. 5 Texas †	12	–	6	.667	29	–	9	.763
No. 15 Kansas State	11	–	7	.611	26	–	10	.722
No. 11 Baylor	11	–	7	.611	23	–	11	.676
Iowa State	9	–	9	.500	19	–	14	.576
No. 22 TCU	9	–	9	.500	22	–	13	.629
Oklahoma State	8	–	10	.444	20	–	16	.556
West Virginia	7	–	11	.389	19	–	15	.559
Texas Tech	5	–	13	.278	16	–	16	.500
Oklahoma	5	–	13	.278	15	–	17	.469
† 2023 Big 12 tournament winner Rankings from AP poll

The 2022–23 Big 12 men's basketball season began with the start of the 2022–23 NCAA Division I men's basketball season in November. Regular season conference play began in December 2022 and concludes in March 2023. The 2023 Big 12 men's basketball tournament was held March 8–11, 2023, at the T-Mobile Center in Kansas City, Missouri.

Kansas won their sixth national championship at the conclusion of the 2021–22 season, defeating North Carolina in the National Championship. This marked the final season for the Big 12 Conference before expanding to 14 teams.

== Coaches ==
=== Coaching changes ===
Coach	School	Reason	Replacement
Bruce Weber	Kansas State	Resignation	Jerome Tang

=== Head coaches ===
Note: Stats are through the beginning of the season. All stats and records are from time at current school only.

Team	Head coach	Previous job	Seasons at school as HC	Overall record at School	Big 12 record	NCAA tournaments	NCAA Final Fours	NCAA Championships
Baylor	Scott Drew	Valparaiso	20th	399–222 (.643)	165–155 (.516)	10	1	1
Iowa State	T. J. Otzelberger	UNLV	2nd	22–13 (.629)	7–11 (.389)	1	0	0
Kansas	Bill Self	Illinois	20th	556–124 (.818)	263–63 (.807)	18	4	2
Kansas State	Jerome Tang	Baylor (asst.)	1st	0–0 (–)	0–0 (–)	0	0	0
Oklahoma	Porter Moser	Loyola Chicago	2nd	19–16 (.543)	7–11 (.389)	0	0	0
Oklahoma State	Mike Boynton	Oklahoma State (asst.)	6th	87–73 (.544)	39–51 (.433)	1	0	0
TCU	Jamie Dixon	Pittsburgh	7th	117–84 (.582)	42–64 (.396)	2	0	0
Texas	Chris Beard	Texas Tech	2nd	22–12 (.647)	10–8 (.556)	1	0	0
Texas Tech	Mark Adams	Texas Tech (asst.)	2nd	27–10 (.730)	12–6 (.667)	1	0	0
West Virginia	Bob Huggins	Kansas State	16th	326–187 (.635)	144–125 (.535)	10	1	0

== Preseason ==
Big 12 Preseason Poll

	Big 12 Coaches	Points
1.	Baylor (5)	77
2.	Kansas (4)	73
3.	Texas (1)	64
4.	TCU	58
5.	Oklahoma State	42
5.	Texas Tech	42
7.	Oklahoma	32
8.	Iowa State	30
9.	West Virginia	20
10.	Kansas State	12
Reference: (#) first place votes

Pre-Season All-Big 12 Team

Big 12 Coaches
Adam Flagler, G Baylor†
Jalen Wilson, F Kansas†
Avery Anderson III, G Oklahoma State
Mike Miles Jr., G TCU†
Timmy Allen, F Texas
Marcus Carr., G Texas
† denotes unanimous selection

- Player of the Year: Mike Miles Jr., TCU
- Newcomer of the Year: Grant Sherfield, Oklahoma
- Freshman of the Year: Keyontae George, Baylor

=== Recruiting classes ===
Rankings
Team	ESPN	Rivals	247 Sports	On3	Signees
Baylor	25	16	42	20	3
Iowa State	-	26	40	44	3
Kansas	5	3	4	3	4
Kansas State	-	51	70	83	3
Oklahoma	-	-	38	50	3
Oklahoma State	-	-	86	65	1
TCU	-	-	93	81	1
Texas	7	8	6	15	4
Texas Tech	-	13	15	22	4
West Virginia	-	24	50	84	5

=== Preseason watchlists ===
Below is a table of notable preseason watch lists.

	Wooden	Naismith	Cousy	West	Erving	Malone	NABC	Abdul-Jabbar
Adam Flagler, Baylor	✓	✓		✓			✓	
Keyonte George, Baylor	✓	✓					✓	
Kevin McCullar, Kansas	✓	✓		✓				
Jalen Wilson, Kansas	✓	✓			✓		✓	
Mike Miles Jr., TCU	✓	✓	✓				✓	
Timmy Allen, Texas	✓							
Tyrese Hunter, Texas	✓	✓	✓					
Osun Osunniyi, Iowa State								✓
Fardaws Aimaq, Texas Tech								✓
Moussa Cissé, Oklahoma State								✓
Grant Sherfield, Oklahoma			✓					
Marcus Carr, Texas		✓						

=== Preseason national polls/ratings ===
	247 Sports	AP	Blue Ribbon; Yearbook	CBS Sports	Coaches	ESPN	Kenpom	NCAA Sports	Sports; Illustrated
Baylor	4	5	9	7	6	8	6	11	10
Iowa State					RV		62	HM	
Kansas	7	5	7	8	5	6	8	5	6
Kansas State							77		
Oklahoma							28	HM	
Oklahoma State							30	HM	
TCU	10	14	17	15	16	16	16	8	19
Texas	12	12	14	12	12	11	2	12	12
Texas Tech	20	25			24	25	17	32	15
West Virginia							73	HM	

== Regular season ==
=== Conference matrix ===
	Baylor	Iowa State	Kansas	Kansas State	Oklahoma	Oklahoma State	TCU	Texas	Texas Tech	West Virginia
vs. Baylor	—	2–0	1–1	2–0	0–2	0–2	1–1	1–1	0–2	0–2
vs. Iowa State	0–2	–	1–1	1–1	1–1	2–0	0–2	1–1	1–1	2–0
vs. Kansas	1–1	1–1	—	1–1	0–2	0–2	1–1	1–1	0–2	0–2
vs. Kansas State	0–2	1–1	1–1	—	1–1	0–2	1–1	1–1	1–1	1–1
vs. Oklahoma	2–0	1–1	2–0	1–1	—	2–0	1–1	2–0	1–1	1–1
vs. Oklahoma State	2–0	0–2	2–0	2–0	0–2	–	1–1	2–0	0–2	1–1
vs. TCU	1–1	2–0	1–1	1–1	1–1	1–1	–	1–1	0–2	1–1
vs. Texas	1–1	1–1	1–1	1–1	0–2	0–2	1–1	—	1–1	0–2
vs. Texas Tech	2–0	1–1	2–0	1–1	1–1	2–0	2–0	1–1	—	1–1
vs. West Virginia	2–0	0–2	2–0	1–1	1–1	1–1	1–1	2–0	1–1	—
Total	11–7	9–9	13–5	11–7	5–13	8–10	9–9	12–6	5–13	7–11

Through end of regular season.

=== Big 12/SEC Challenge ===
Date	Time	Big 12 team	SEC team	Location	TV	Attendance	Winner	Leader	All-Time
Sat., Jan. 28	11:00 AM	West Virginia	15 Auburn	WVU Coliseum • Morgantown, WV	ESPN	14,116	West Virginia (80–77)	Big 12 (1–0)	Big 12 (49–41)
Sat., Jan. 28	1:00 PM	Oklahoma	2 Alabama	Lloyd Noble Center • Norman, OK	ESPN	10,869	Oklahoma (93–69)	Big 12 (2–0)	Big 12 (50–41)
Sat., Jan. 28	1:00 PM	Texas Tech	LSU	Pete Maravich Assembly Center • Baton Rouge, LA	ESPNU	9,939	Texas Tech (76–68)	Big 12 (3–0)	Big 12 (50–42)
Sat., Jan. 28	1:00 PM	12 Iowa State	Missouri	Mizzou Arena • Columbia, MO	ESPN2	15,601	Missouri (78–61)	Big 12 (3–1)	Big 12 (51–42)
Sat., Jan. 28	3:00 PM	11 TCU	Mississippi State	Humphrey Coliseum • Starkville, MS	ESPN2	8,643	Mississippi State (81–74) (OT)	Big 12 (3–2)	Big 12 (51-43)
Sat., Jan. 28	3:00 PM	17 Baylor	Arkansas	Ferrell Center • Waco, TX	ESPN	10,627	Baylor (67–64)	Big 12 (4–2)	Big 12 (52–43)
Sat., Jan. 28	5:00 PM	10 Texas	4 Tennessee	Thompson–Boling Arena • Knoxville, TN	ESPN	21,678	Tennessee (82–71)	Big 12 (4–3)	Big 12 (52–44)
Sat., Jan. 28	5:00 PM	5 Kansas State	Florida	Bramlage Coliseum • Manhattan, KS	ESPN2	11,000	Kansas State (64–50)	Big 12 (5–3)	Big 12 (53–44)
Sat., Jan. 28	7:00 PM	9 Kansas	Kentucky	Rupp Arena • Lexington, KY	ESPN	20,418	Kansas (77–68)	Big 12 (6–3)	Big 12 (54–44)
Sat., Jan. 28	7:00 PM	Oklahoma State	Ole Miss	Gallagher-Iba Arena • Stillwater, OK	ESPN2	9,973	Oklahoma State (82–60)	Big 12 (7–3)	Big 12 (55–44)
Georgia, South Carolina, Texas A&M and Vanderbilt did not participate for the SEC. All times Central

=== Big East-Big 12 Battle ===
Date	Time	Big East team	Big 12 team	Score	Location	Television	Attendance	Leader
Tue., Nov. 29	7:30 PM	Marquette	No. 6 Baylor	96–70	Fiserv Forum • Milwaukee, WI	FS1	14,022	Big East (1–0)
Wed., Nov. 30	5:30 PM	Butler	Kansas State	76–64	Hinkle Fieldhouse • Indianapolis, IN	FS1	7,660	Big East (2–0)
Wed., Nov. 30	7:00 PM	Providence	TCU	75–62	Schollmaier Arena • Fort Worth, TX	ESPN+	5,593	Big East (2–1)
Wed., Nov. 30	7:00 PM	Georgetown	Texas Tech	79–65	United Supermarkets Arena • Lubbock, TX	ESPN+	14,649	Tie (2–2)
Thu., Dec. 1	5:30 PM	No. 8 UConn	Oklahoma State	74–64	Harry A. Gampel Pavilion • Storrs, CT	FS1	10,167	Big East (3–2)
Thu., Dec. 1	6:00 PM	No. 7 Creighton	No. 2 Texas	72–67	Moody Center • Austin, TX	ESPN	10,763	Tie (3–3)
Thu., Dec. 1	8:00 PM	Seton Hall	No. 9 Kansas	91–65	Allen Fieldhouse • Lawrence, KS	ESPN	16,300	Big 12 (4–3)
Sat., Dec. 3	11:00 AM	Villanova	Oklahoma	70–66	Wells Fargo Center • Philadelphia, PA	CBS	17,079	Tie (4–4)
Sat., Dec. 3	5:30 PM	Xavier	West Virginia	84–74	Cintas Center • Cincinnati, Ohio	FS1	10,460	Big East (5–4)
Sun., Dec. 4	2:00 PM	St. John's	No. 23 Iowa State	71–60	Hilton Coliseum • Ames, Iowa	ESPN2	13,377	Tie (5–5)
WINNERS ARE IN BOLD. HOME TEAM IN ITALICS. All times Central. Matchups announced May 19, 2022. Rankings from AP Poll released prior to the game. Did not participate: DePaul

=== Multi-Team Events ===
	MTE	Place/Finish
Baylor	Continental Tire Main Event	3rd
Iowa State	Phil Knight Invitational	2nd
Kansas	Battle for Atlantis	2nd
Kansas State	Cayman Islands Classic	1st
Oklahoma	ESPN Events Invitational	1st
Oklahoma State	Baha Mar Hoops Bahamas Championship	3rd
TCU	Emerald Coast Classic	1st
Texas	Leon Black Classic	2-0
Texas Tech	Maui Jim Invitational	6th
West Virginia	Phil Knight Legacy	5th

=== Big 12 Players of the Week ===
Week	Player of the week	Newcomer of the week
November 14, 2022	Adam Flagler, Baylor	Keyontae Johnson, Kansas State
November 21, 2022	LJ Cryer, Bayor	Gradey Dick, Kansas
November 28, 2022	Markquis Nowell, Kansas State	Jaren Holmes, Iowa State
December 5, 2022	Jalen Wilson, Kansas	Keyonte George, Baylor
December 5, 2022	Jalen Wilson, Kansas	Gradey Dick, Kansas (2)
December 12, 2022	Tre Mitchell, West Virginia	Grant Sherfield, Oklahoma
December 19, 2022	Marcus Carr, Texas	Keyontae Johnson, Kansas State (2)
December 27, 2022	Emanuel Miller, TCU	Nae’Qwan Tomlin, Kansas State
December 27, 2022	Emanuel Miller, TCU	Grant Sherfield, Oklahoma (2)
January 2, 2023	Marcus Carr, Texas (2)	Keyonte George, Baylor (2)
January 9, 2023	Markquis Nowell, Kansas State (2)	Keyontae Johnson, Kansas State (3)
January 16, 2023	KJ Adams, Kansas	Sir'Jabari Rice, Texas
January 23, 2023	Avery Anderson III, Oklahoma State	Keyontae Johnson, Kansas State (4)
January 30, 2023	LJ Cryer, Baylor (2)	Erik Stevenson, West Virginia
February 6, 2023	Kalib Boone, Oklahoma State	Sir'Jabari Rice, Texas (2)
February 13, 2023	Adam Flagler, Baylor (2)	John-Michael Wright, Oklahoma State
February 20, 2023	De'Vion Harmon, Texas Tech	Gradey Dick, Kansas (3)
February 27, 2023	Marquis Nowell, Kansas State (3)	Keyontae Johnson, Kansas State (5)
March 6, 2023	Erik Stevenson, West Virginia	Erik Stevenson, West Virginia (2)

== Rankings ==
Legend
Increase in ranking
Decrease in ranking
Not ranked previous week

		Pre	Wk 1	Wk 2	Wk 3	Wk 4	Wk 5	Wk 6	Wk 7	Wk 8	Wk 9	Wk 10	Wk 11	Wk 12	Wk 13	Wk 14	Wk 15	Wk 16	Wk 17	Wk 18	Final
Baylor	AP	5	5	7	6	12	11	12	12	19	RV	21	17	11	14	9	9	7	10	11	-
Baylor	C	6	6	–	10	12	11	13	13	16	RV	22	17	11	12	9	10	7	10	11	
Iowa State	AP				23	20	RV	RV	RV	25	14	12	12	13	11	19	23	RV	RV	RV	-
Iowa State	C	RV		–	23	20	RV	RV	RV	25	14	12	13	13	13	18	21	RV	RV	RV	
Kansas	AP	5	6	3	6	6	8	4	4	3	2	2	9	8	9	5	3	3	3	4	-
Kansas	C	5	5	–	9	6	6	4	4	3	2	2	9	8	8	7	4	3	4	5	
Kansas State	AP				RV	RV	RV	RV	RV	RV	11	13	5	7	12	12	14	11	12	15	-
Kansas State	C			–	RV	RV	RV	RV	RV	RV	13	15	5	6	11	14	16	11	12	13	
Oklahoma	AP				RV																-
Oklahoma	C			–	RV	RV															
Oklahoma State	AP															RV	RV				-
Oklahoma State	C			–											RV	RV	RV				
TCU	AP	14	15	RV	RV	24	21	20	18	17	17	14	11	15	17	22	24	22	22	22	-
TCU	C	16	18	–	RV	25	22	19	19	17	17	13	11	16	19	24	RV	22	23	23	
Texas	AP	12	11	4	2	2	7	7	6	6	10	7	10	10	5	6	8	9	7	5	-
Texas	C	12	11	–	2	2	8	7	6	6	10	7	10	9	6	5	8	7	7	7	
Texas Tech	AP	25	23	21	RV	RV	RV	RV	RV												-
Texas Tech	C	24	22	–	RV	RV	RV	RV	RV	RV	RV	RV					RV				
West Virginia	AP			RV	RV	RV	RV	RV	24	RV				RV	RV			RV	RV	RV	-
West Virginia	C			–	RV	RV	RV	RV	24	RV									RV		

== Record vs Other Conferences ==
The Big 12 had a record of 118–30 in non-conference pla.

Power 6 Conferences
Conference	Record
ACC	5–4
Big East	9–8
Big Ten	7–5
Pac–12	7–0
SEC	13–6
Combined	41–23

Other Conferences
Conference	Record
America East	0–0
American	4–1
ASUN	2–0
Atlantic 10	1–0
Big Sky	6–0
Big South	1–0
Big West	1–0
Colonial	3–0
Conference USA	4–2
Horizon	4–0
Independents/Non-Division I	0–0
Ivy League	2–0
Metro Atlantic	1–0
Mid-American	2–0
Mid-Eastern Athletic	2–0
Missouri Valley	0–1
Mountain West	1–0
Northeast	0–0
Ohio Valley	1–0
Patriot	2–0
Southern	0–0
Southland	12–1
Southwestern Athletic	10–0
Summit	5–0
Sun Belt	3–0
West Coast	2–1
Western Athletic	8–1
Combined	77–7

== Postseason ==
=== Big 12 tournament ===
- March 8–11, T-Mobile Center, Kansas City, MO.

2023 Big 12 men's basketball tournament seeds and results
Seed	School	Conf.	Over.	Tiebreaker	First round March 8	Quarterfinals March 9	Semifinals March 10	Championship March 11
1.	Kansas‡	13–5	25–6		Bye	W vs. West Virginia	W vs. Iowa State	L vs. Texas
2.	Texas†	12–6	23–8		Bye	W vs. Oklahoma State	W vs. TCU	W vs. Kansas
3.	Kansas State†	11–7	23–8	2–0 vs. BU	Bye	L vs. TCU		
4.	Baylor†	11–7	22–9	0–2 vs. KSU	Bye	L. vs. Iowa State		
5.	Iowa State†	9–9	18–12	2–0 vs. TCU	Bye	W. vs. Baylor	L vs. Kansas	
6.	TCU†	9–9	20–11	0–2 vs. ISU	Bye	W vs. Kansas State	L vs. Texas	
7.	Oklahoma State	8–10	17–14		W vs. Oklahoma	L vs. Texas		
8.	West Virginia	7–11	18–13		W vs. Texas Tech	L. vs. Kansas		
9.	Texas Tech	5–13	16–15	1–1 vs. OU, 0–2 vs. KU, 1–1 vs. UT	L vs. West Virginia			
10.	Oklahoma	5–13	15–16	1–1 vs. TT, 0–2 vs. KU, 0–2 vs. UT	L vs. Oklahoma State			
‡ – Big 12 regular season champions, and tournament No. 1 seed. † – Received a single-bye in the conference tournament. Overall records include all games played in the Big 12 tournament.

=== Bracket ===
First round Wednesday, March 8
8	West Virginia	78
9	Texas Tech	62
7	Oklahoma State	57
10	Oklahoma	49

Quarterfinals; Thursday, March 9
1	Kansas	68
8	West Virginia	61
4	Baylor	72
5	Iowa State	78
2	Texas	60
7	Oklahoma State	47
3	Kansas State	67
6	TCU	80

Semifinals; Friday, March 10
1	Kansas	71
5	Iowa State	58
2	Texas	66
6	TCU	60

Championship; Saturday, March 11
1	Kansas	59
2	Texas	75

=== NCAA Tournament ===
Seed	Region	School	First round	Second round	Sweet 16	Elite Eight	Final Four	Championship
1	West	Kansas	defeated (16) Howard 96–68	lost to vs. (8) Arkansas 72–71				
2	Midwest	Texas	defeated (15) Colgate 81–61	defeated (10) Penn State 71–66	defeated (3) Xavier 83–71	lost to (5) Miami 88–81		
3	South	Baylor	defeated (14) UC Santa Barbara 74–56	lost to (6) Creighton 85–76				
3	East	Kansas State	defeated (14) Montana State 77–65	defeated (6) Kentucky 75–69	defeated (7) Michigan State 98–93 ^{OT}	lost to (9) Florida Atlantic 79–76		
6	Midwest	Iowa State	lost to (11) Pittsburgh 59–41					
6	West	TCU	defeated (11) Arizona State 72–70	lost to (3) Gonzaga 84–81				
9	South	West Virginia	lost to (8) Maryland 67–65					
	7 Bids	W-L (%):	5–2 .714	2–3 .400	2–0 1.000	0–2 .000	0–0 –	TOTAL: 9–7 .563

=== NIT ===
Seed	School	First round	Second round	Quarterfinals	Semifinals	Final
1	Oklahoma State	defeated Youngstown State 69–65	vs. E. Washington 71–60	lost to (2) North Texas 65–59		
	W-L (%):	1–0 1.000	1–0 1.000	0–1 .000	0–0 –	TOTAL: 2–1 .667

== Honors and awards ==
=== All-Americans ===
Consensus All-Americans
First Team
Jalen Wilson, KU

To earn "consensus" status, a player must win honors from a majority of the following teams: the Associated Press, the USBWA, Sporting News, and the National Association of Basketball Coaches.

Other All-American Honors: Marquis Nowell, Kansas State (AP-3, USBWA-3, TSN-3, NABC-3); Keyontae Johnson, Kansas State (AP-3, NABC-3); Marcus Carr, Texas (AP-HM); Adam Flager, Baylor (AP-HM); Mike Miles Jr., TCU (AP-HM)

=== All-Big 12 awards and teams ===
2023 Big 12 Men's Basketball Individual Awards
Award	Recipient(s)
Player of the Year	Jalen Wilson, Kansas†
Coach of the Year	Jerome Tang, Kansas State
Defensive Player of the Year	Dajuan Harris Jr., Kansas
Sixth Man Award	Sir'Jabari Rice, Texas
Newcomer of the Year	Keyontae Johnson, Kansas State
Freshman of the Year	Keyonte George, Baylor†
Most Improved Player	KJ Adams Jr., Kansas

2023 Big 12 Men's Basketball All-Conference Teams
First Team	Second Team	Third Team	Defensive Team	Newcomer Team	Freshman Team
Adam Flagler, BU†; Jalen Wilson, KU†; Keyontae Johnson, KSU; Markquis Nowell, KSU; Marcus Carr, UT	Keyonte George, BU; Gabe Kalscheur, ISU; Gradey Dick, KU; Damion Baugh, TCU; Mike Miles Jr., TCU	LJ Cryer, BU; Kevin McCullar, KU; Kalib Boone, OSU; Sir'Jabari Rice, UT; Erik Stevenson, WVU	Gabe Kalscheur, ISU; Dajuan Harris Jr., KU; Kevin McCullar, KU; Markquis Nowell, KSU; Moussa Cisse, OSU	Keyonte George, BU; Jaren Holmes, ISU; Gradey Dick, KU; Keyontae Johnson, KSU†; Sir'Jabari Rice, UT	Keyonte George, BU†; Tamin Lipsey, ISU†; Gradey Dick, KU†; Milos Uzan, OU; Pop Issacs, TT
† - denotes unanimous selection

Honorable Mention: Jaren Holmes, (Iowa State), Osun Osunniyi (Iowa State), KJ Adams Jr. (Kansas), Dajuan Harris Jr. (Kansas), Jalen Hill (Oklahoma), Grant Sherfield (Oklahoma), Emanuel Miller (TCU), Timmy Allen (Texas), De’Vion Harmon (Texas Tech), Kevin Obanor (Texas Tech)

== NBA draft ==
The following list includes all Big 12 players who were drafted in the 2023 NBA draft.

Player	Position	School	Round	Pick	Team
Jarace Walker	PF	Houston	1	8	Washington Wizards (traded to Indiana Pacers)
Gradey Dick	SG/SF	Kansas	1	13	Toronto Raptors
Keyonte George	SG	Baylor	1	16	Utah Jazz (from Minnesota Timberwolves)
Marcus Sasser	PG/SG	Houston	1	25	Memphis Grizzlies (traded to Detroit Pistons via Boston Celtics)
Keyontae Johnson	SF	Kansas State	2	50	Oklahoma City Thunder (from Miami Heat via Boston, Memphis Grizzlies, and Dallas Mavericks)
Jalen Wilson	SF	Kansas	2	51	Brooklyn Nets
