= 2022–23 Iowa State Cyclones men's basketball team =

American college basketball season

2022–23 Iowa State Cyclones men's basketball

NCAA tournament, First Round
- Conference: Big 12 Conference
- Record: 19–14 (9–9 Big 12)
- Head coach: T. J. Otzelberger (2nd season)
- Assistant coaches: Kyle Green; J.R. Blount; Nate Schmidt
- Home arena: Hilton Coliseum

2022–23 Big 12 men's basketball standings
	Conf.				Overall
Team	W		L	PCT	W		L	PCT
No. 4 Kansas	13	–	5	.722	28	–	8	.778
No. 5 Texas †	12	–	6	.667	29	–	9	.763
No. 15 Kansas State	11	–	7	.611	26	–	10	.722
No. 11 Baylor	11	–	7	.611	23	–	11	.676
Iowa State	9	–	9	.500	19	–	14	.576
No. 22 TCU	9	–	9	.500	22	–	13	.629
Oklahoma State	8	–	10	.444	20	–	16	.556
West Virginia	7	–	11	.389	19	–	15	.559
Texas Tech	5	–	13	.278	16	–	16	.500
Oklahoma	5	–	13	.278	15	–	17	.469
† 2023 Big 12 tournament winner Rankings from AP poll

The 2022–23 Iowa State Cyclones men's basketball team represented Iowa State University during the 2022–23 NCAA Division I men's basketball season. The Cyclones were coached by T. J. Otzelberger in his second season as head coach, and 10th season at Iowa State. They played their home games at Hilton Coliseum in Ames, Iowa as members of the Big 12 Conference. They finished the season 19–14, 9–9 in Big 12 Play to finish in a two-way tie for 5th place. They defeated Baylor in the quarterfinals of the Big 12 Tournament before losing to Kansas in the semifinals. They received an at-large bid to the NCAA Tournament, where they were eliminated in the first round by Pittsburgh.

== Previous season ==
The Cyclones started the season 12–0, for one of the best starts in school history, including being crowned the champion of the NIT Season Tip-Off with wins over 25th-ranked Xavier and 9th-ranked Memphis. In Otzelberger's first season as head coach, he claimed the best start to an Iowa State coaching career by winning his first 10 games, ultimately winning his first 12 games before losing at home to No. 1 Baylor to end his unbeaten start at Iowa State. They finished the season 2021–22 season 22–13, 7–11 in Big 12 play to finish in a tie for seventh place. As the No. 6 seed in the Big 12 tournament, they lost to Texas Tech in the quarterfinals. They received an at-large bid to the NCAA tournament as the No. 11 seed in the Midwest region. There, they defeated LSU and Wisconsin to advance to the Sweet Sixteen. In the Sweet Sixteen, they lost to Miami.

== Offseason ==
=== Departures ===
Offseason departures
Name	Position	Reason for departure
Izaiah Brockington	Guard	Graduated
George Conditt IV	Center	Graduated
Tristan Enaruna	Forward	Transferred to Cleveland State
Tyrese Hunter	Guard	Transferred to Texas
Tre Jackson	Guard	Transferred to Western Carolina
Jaden Walker	Guard	Transferred to East Carolina

=== Incoming transfers ===
Incoming transfers
Name	Position	Hometown	Previous school	Remaining eligibility	Notes
Jaren Holmes	Guard	Romulus, Michigan	St. Bonaventure	1	Holmes was previously at Ranger Community College before transferring to St. Bonaventure.
Osun Osunniyi	Center	Linwood, New Jersey	St. Bonaventure	1	
Hason Ward	Forward	Saint Thomas, Barbados	VCU	2	
Jeremiah Williams	Guard	Chicago	Temple	3	
Conrad Hawley	Forward	Raymore, Missouri	Kansas	3	Hawley was a scholarship football player for the University of Kansas.

=== 2022 recruiting class ===
College recruiting
Name	Hometown	School	Height	Weight	Commit date
Eli King; SG	Caledonia, Minnesota	Caledonia	6 ft 3 in (1.91 m)	185 lb (84 kg)	Apr 20, 2021
Eli King; SG	Recruit ratings: Rivals: 247Sports: ESPN: (80)				
Tamin Lipsey; PG	Ames, Iowa	Ames	6 ft 2 in (1.88 m)	170 lb (77 kg)	Apr 14, 2021
Tamin Lipsey; PG	Recruit ratings: Rivals: 247Sports: ESPN: (81)				
Demarion Watson; SF	Minneapolis, Minnesota	Totino-Grace	6 ft 6 in (1.98 m)	175 lb (79 kg)	Jul 26, 2021
Demarion Watson; SF	Recruit ratings: Rivals: 247Sports: ESPN: (NR)				
Overall recruit ranking: Rivals: 42 247Sports: 45
Note: In many cases, Scout, Rivals, 247Sports, On3, and ESPN may conflict in their listings of height and weight.; In these cases, the average was taken. ESPN grades are on a 100-point scale.; Sources: "Iowa State 2022 Basketball Commitments". Rivals.; "2022 Iowa State Cyclones Recruiting Class". ESPN.; "2022 Team Ranking". Rivals.

== Roster ==
2022–23 Iowa State Cyclones men's basketball team
Players
Coaches
**

Pos.	#	Name	Height	Weight	Year	Previous school	Hometown
F	0	Tre King	6 ft 7 in (2.01 m)	236 lb (107 kg)	RS Sr	Georgetown	Lexington, Kentucky
G	1	Eli King	6 ft 3 in (1.91 m)	182 lb (83 kg)	Fr	Caledonia High School	Caledonia, Minnesota
G	2	Caleb Grill	6 ft 3 in (1.91 m)	196 lb (89 kg)	RS Sr	UNLV	Wichita, Kansas
G	3	Tamin Lipsey	6 ft 1 in (1.85 m)	200 lb (91 kg)	Fr	Ames High School	Ames, Iowa
G	4	Demarion Watson	6 ft 6 in (1.98 m)	197 lb (89 kg)	Fr	Totino-Grace	Minneapolis, Minnesota
F	5	Aljaž Kunč	6 ft 8 in (2.03 m)	222 lb (101 kg)	Sr	Washington State	Ljubljana, Slovenia
F	12	Robert Jones	6 ft 10 in (2.08 m)	240 lb (109 kg)	Sr	Denver	Prior Lake, Minnesota
G	13	Jaren Holmes	6 ft 4 in (1.93 m)	207 lb (94 kg)	RS Sr	St. Bonaventure	Grosse Pointe Woods, Michigan
F/C	21	Osun Osunniyi	6 ft 10 in (2.08 m)	218 lb (99 kg)	RS Sr	St. Bonaventure	Pleasantville, New Jersey
G	22	Gabe Kalscheur	6 ft 4 in (1.93 m)	194 lb (88 kg)	Sr	Minnesota	Edina, Minnesota
F	23	Conrad Hawley	6 ft 5 in (1.96 m)	209 lb (95 kg)	So	Kansas*	Raymore, Missouri
F	24	Hason Ward	6 ft 9 in (2.06 m)	215 lb (98 kg)	Sr	VCU	Springfield, Massachusetts
G	25	Jeremiah Williams (injured)	6 ft 4 in (1.93 m)	177 lb (80 kg)	Jr	Temple	Chicago

Head coach

- T. J. Otzelberger (UW–Whitewater)

Assistant coach(es)

- Kyle Green (Hamline)
- J.R. Blount (Loyola Chicago)
- Nate Schmidt (Denison)

Legend

- (C) Team captain
- (S) Suspended
- (I) Ineligible
- (W) Walk-on
- Injured
- Current redshirt

Roster
Last update: May 12, 2022

*Hawley played football at Kansas and was not a member of the basketball team
**Grill was dismissed from the team on March 1

== Schedule and results ==
Date time, TV	Rank^{#}	Opponent^{#}	Result	Record	High points	High rebounds	High assists	Site (attendance) city, state
Regular season
Nov 7, 2022*; 7:00 p.m., ESPN+		IUPUI	W 88–39	1–0	23 – Holmes	7 – Kunč	5 – Lipsey	Hilton Coliseum (12,562); Ames, Iowa
Nov 13, 2022*; 12:00 p.m., ESPN+		North Carolina A&T	W 80–43	2–0	17 – Kunč	10 – Kunč	4 – Kunč	Hilton Coliseum (12,731); Ames, Iowa
Nov 20, 2022*; 5:00 p.m., ESPN+		Milwaukee	W 68–53	3–0	19 – Holmes	8 – Watson	5 – Holmes	Hilton Coliseum (11,785); Ames, Iowa
Nov 24, 2022*; 2:30 p.m., ESPN2		vs. Villanova; Phil Knight Invitational (PK85) first round	W 81–79 ^{OT}	4–0	23 – Kalscheur	6 – Kunč	9 – Holmes	Moda Center (6,229); Portland, OR
Nov 25, 2022*; 4:30 p.m., ESPN		vs. No. 1 North Carolina; Phil Knight Invitational (PK85) semifinal	W 70–65	5–0	31 – Grill	6 – Kunč	6 – Lipsey	Veterans Memorial Coliseum (4,431); Portland, OR
Nov 27, 2022*; 9:00 p.m., ESPN		vs. No. 20 UConn; Phil Knight Invitational (PK85) Championship	L 53–71	5–1	14 – Osunniyi	5 – Kunč	3 – Lipsey	Moda Center (5,005); Portland, OR
Nov 30, 2022*; 7:00 p.m., ESPN+	No. 23	North Dakota	W 63–44	6–1	16 – Grill	10 – Watson	6 – Kunč	Hilton Coliseum (12,467); Ames, Iowa
Dec 4, 2022*; 2:00 p.m., ESPN2	No. 23	St. John's; Big East–Big 12 Battle	W 71–60	7–1	14 – Holmes	10 – Grill	3 – Tied	Hilton Coliseum (13,377); Ames, Iowa
Dec 8, 2022*; 7:00 p.m., FS1	No. 20	at Iowa; Rivalry	L 56–75	7–2	12 – Kalscheur	10 – Jones	5 – Lipsey	Carver–Hawkeye Arena (14,535); Iowa City, Iowa
Dec 11, 2022*; 5:00 p.m., ESPN+	No. 20	McNeese State	W 77–40	8–2	21 – Kunč	8 – Kunč	8 – Lipsey	Hilton Coliseum (12,886); Ames, Iowa
Dec 18, 2022*; 12:00 p.m., ESPN+		Western Michigan	W 73–57	9–2	14 – Grill	6 – Grill	5 – Tied	Hilton Coliseum (11,992); Ames, Iowa
Dec 21, 2022*; 6:00 p.m., ESPN+		Omaha	Cancelled due to severe weather					Hilton Coliseum; Ames, Iowa
Dec 31, 2022; 1:00 p.m, ESPNU		No. 12 Baylor	W 77–62	10–2 (1–0)	23 – Kalscheur	7 – Grill	8 – Lipsey	Hilton Coliseum (14,267); Ames, Iowa
Jan 4, 2023; 6:00 p.m., ESPN2	No. 25	at Oklahoma	W 63–60	11–2 (2–0)	20 – Grill	8 – Osunniyi	4 – Tied	Lloyd Noble Center (4,758); Norman, Oklahoma
Jan 7, 2023; 1:00 p.m., ESPNU	No. 25	at No. 17 TCU	W 69–67	12–2 (3–0)	15 – Kalscheur	5 – Tied	4 – Tied	Schollmaier Arena (6,333); Fort Worth, Texas
Jan 10, 2023; 7:00 p.m., ESPN+	No. 14	Texas Tech	W 84–50	13–2 (4–0)	25 – Kalscheur	7 – Kalscheur	8 – Lipsey	Hilton Coliseum (13,464); Ames, Iowa
Jan 14, 2023; 3:00 p.m., ESPN+	No. 14	at No. 2 Kansas	L 60–62	13–3 (4–1)	23 – Kalscheur	9 – Jones	6 – Lipsey	Allen Fieldhouse (16,300); Lawrence, Kansas
Jan 17, 2023; 7:00 p.m., ESPN+	No. 12	No. 7 Texas	W 78–67	14–3 (5–1)	21 – Holmes	7 – Osunniyi	6 – Lipsey	Hilton Coliseum (14,267); Ames, Iowa
Jan 21, 2023; 1:00 p.m., ESPN+	No. 12	at Oklahoma State	L 59–61	14–4 (5–2)	15 – Osunniyi	8 – T. King	6 – Holmes	Gallagher-Iba Arena (6,656); Stillwater, Oklahoma
Jan 24, 2023; 8:00 p.m., ESPNU	No. 12	No. 5 Kansas State	W 80–76	15–4 (6–2)	23 – Holmes	6 – Lipsey	7 – Holmes	Hilton Coliseum (14,267); Ames, Iowa
Jan 28, 2023*; 1:00 p.m., ESPN2	No. 12	at Missouri; Big 12/SEC Challenge	L 61–78	15–5	19 – Holmes	8 – Jones	6 – Lipsey	Mizzou Arena (15,601); Columbia, Missouri
Jan 30, 2023; 8:00 p.m., ESPN2	No. 13	at Texas Tech	L 77–80 ^{OT}	15–6 (6–3)	24 – Grill	7 – Tied	4 – Lipsey	United Supermarkets Arena (10,428); Lubbock, Texas
Feb 4, 2023; 11:00 a.m., ESPN	No. 13	No. 8 Kansas	W 68–53	16–6 (7–3)	15 – Holmes	8 – Lipsey	10 – Lipsey	Hilton Coliseum (14,267); Ames, Iowa
Feb 8, 2023; 6:00 p.m., ESPN2	No. 11	at West Virginia	L 71–76	16–7 (7–4)	18 – Holmes	10 – Grill	5 – Holmes	WVU Coliseum (11,573); Morgantown, West Virginia
Feb 11, 2023; 5:00 p.m., ESPN2	No. 11	Oklahoma State	L 56–64	16–8 (7–5)	13 – Kunc	8 – Osunniyi	3 – Tied	Hilton Coliseum (14,267); Ames, Iowa
Feb 15, 2023; 8:00 p.m., ESPNU	No. 19	No. 22 TCU	W 70–59	17–8 (8–5)	22 – Kunč	5 – Tied	6 – Lipsey	Hilton Coliseum (13,557); Ames, Iowa
Feb 18, 2023; 1:00 p.m., ESPN	No. 19	at No. 12 Kansas State	L 55–61	17–9 (8–6)	15 – Kunč	7 – Lipsey	5 – Lipsey	Bramlage Coliseum (11,000); Manhattan, Kansas
Feb 21, 2023; 8:00 p.m., LHN	No. 23	at No. 8 Texas	L 54–72	17–10 (8–7)	12 – Osunniyi	7 – Holmes	3 – Tied	Moody Center (11,313); Austin, Texas
Feb 25, 2023; 11:00 a.m., ESPNU	No. 23	Oklahoma	L 50–61	17–11 (8–8)	12 – Kalscheur	7 – Jones	3 – Holmes	Hilton Coliseum (14,267); Ames, Iowa
Feb 27, 2023; 8:00 p.m., ESPN2		West Virginia	L 69–72	17–12 (8–9)	26 – Kalscheur	5 – Tied	3 – Tied	Hilton Coliseum (13,575); Ames, Iowa
Mar 4, 2023; 11:00 a.m., ESPN2		at No. 7 Baylor	W 73–58	18–12 (9–9)	16 – Holmes	7 – T. King	5 – Tied	Ferrell Center (10,105); Waco, Texas
Big 12 Tournament
March 9, 2023; 11:30 a.m., ESPN	(5)	vs. (4) No. 10 Baylor; Quarterfinals	W 78–72	19–12	24 – Kalscheur	11 – Lipsey	5 – Tied	T-Mobile Center (18,034); Kansas City, Missouri
March 10, 2023; 6:00 p.m., ESPN	(5)	vs. (1) No. 3 Kansas; Semifinals	L 58–71	19–13	16 – Holmes	5 – Tied	3 – Lipsey	T-Mobile Center (19,135); Kansas City, Missouri
NCAA Tournament
March 17, 2023; 2:10 p.m., TruTV	(6 MW)	vs. (11 MW) Pittsburgh; First Round	L 41–59	19–14	12 – Tied	10 – Lipsey	4 – Holmes	Greensboro Coliseum (16,150); Greensboro, North Carolina
*Non-conference game. ^{#}Rankings from AP poll. (#) Tournament seedings in parentheses. All times are in Central Time.
