= Keyontae Johnson =

American basketball player (born 2000)

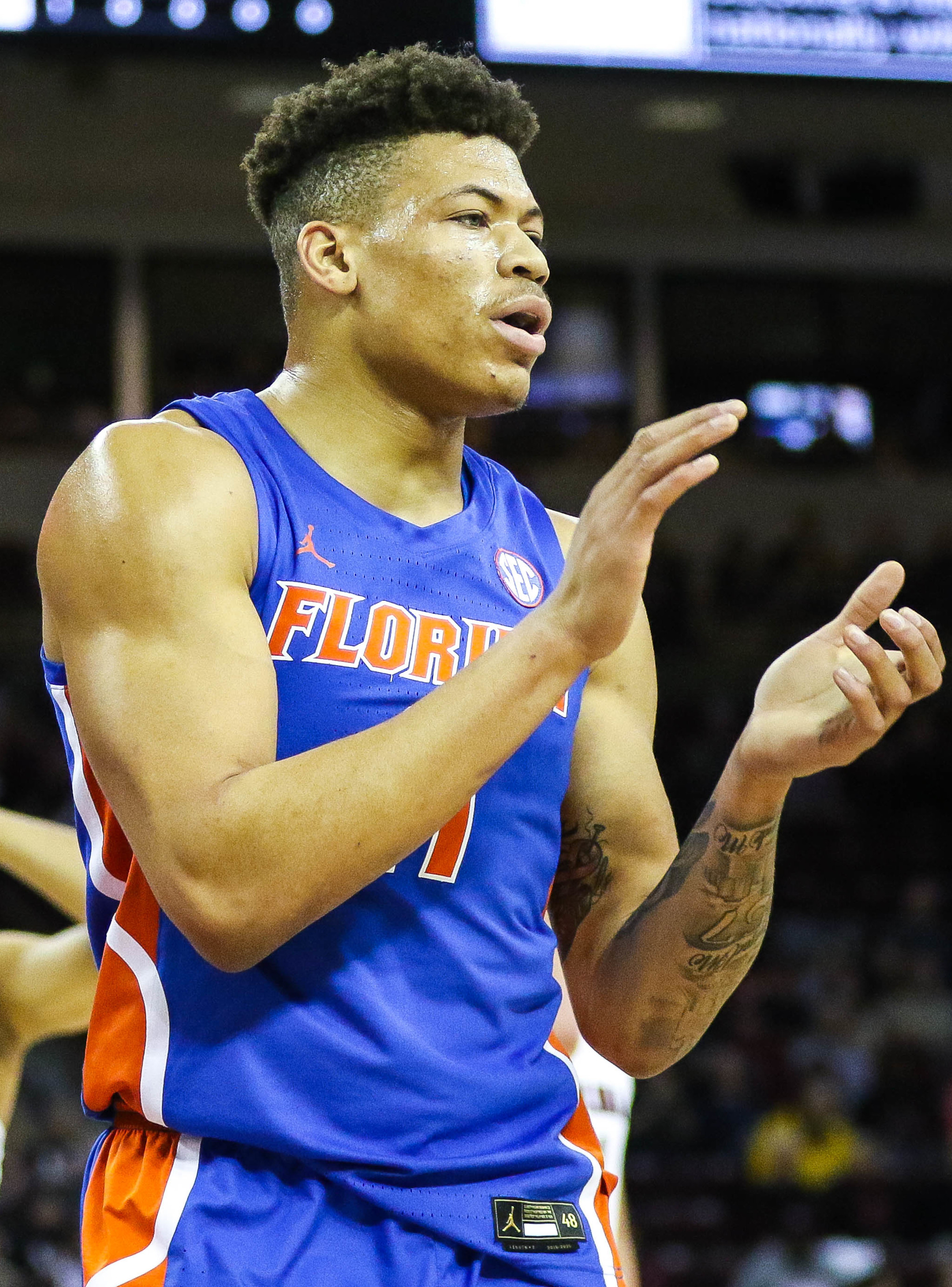
- Johnson with Florida in 2020

No. 11 – Alvark Tokyo
- Position: Small forward
- League: B.League

Personal information
- Born: May 24, 2000 (age 26) Norfolk, Virginia, U.S.
- Listed height: 6 ft 4 in (1.93 m)
- Listed weight: 230 lb (104 kg)

Career information
- High school: Norview (Norfolk, Virginia); IMG Academy (Bradenton, Florida); Oak Hill Academy (Mouth of Wilson, Virginia)
- College: Florida (2018–2022); Kansas State (2022–2023)
- NBA draft: 2023: 2nd round, 50th overall pick
- Drafted by: Oklahoma City Thunder
- Playing career: 2023–present

Career history
- 2023–2024: Oklahoma City Thunder
- 2023–2024: →Oklahoma City Blue
- 2024–2026: Greensboro Swarm
- 2026: Shandong Hi-Speed Kirin
- 2026–present: Alvark Tokyo

Career highlights
- NBA G League champion (2024); NBA G League Next Up Game (2024); Third-team All-American – AP, NABC (2023); Big 12 Newcomer of the Year (2023); First-team All-Big 12 (2023); First-team All-SEC (2020); Big 12 All-Newcomer Team (2023)
- Stats at NBA.com
- Stats at Basketball Reference

Marrecus Keyontae Johnson (/kiˈɒnteɪ/ kee-ON-tay; born May 24, 2000) is an American professional basketball player for Alvark Tokyo of the Japanese B.League. He played college basketball for the Kansas State Wildcats and Florida Gators.

== Early life ==
Johnson grew up in Norfolk, Virginia and originally attended Norview High School before transferring to IMG Academy in Bradenton, Florida before his junior year. He played at IMG for one season before transferring again to Oak Hill Academy in Mouth of Wilson, Virginia for his senior season after his head coach, Vince Walden, left the school to become an assistant coach at Arkansas State. During the Nike EYBL finals at Peach Jam, Johnson averaged 12.9 points and 7.6 rebounds per game. As a senior, he scored at least 18 points in 19 of Oak Hill's games. Rated a four-star recruit by 247Sports and ESPN (who also rated him as a top 100 recruit), Johnson committed to playing college basketball for Florida over an offer from Texas Tech while also receiving interest from Providence, Minnesota, Virginia Tech, Wake Forest and Georgia Tech.

== College career ==
=== Florida ===
In 2018, Johnson began his true freshman season as a key reserve, and eventually became the Gators' starting small forward going into the team's game against Georgia. He started the final 20 games of the season, and finished the season with 8.1 points, 6.4 rebounds, and 1.3 assists per game.

Johnson averaged 13.7 points and 10 rebounds during the 2019 SEC men's basketball tournament, as the Gators went to the tournament semifinal. He scored 20 points and 12 rebounds in the opening round against Arkansas, a double-double.

On February 26, 2020, Johnson scored a career-high 25 points to go with 11 rebounds in an 81–66 win against LSU. As a sophomore, he averaged 14 points, 7.1 rebounds, 1.6 assists and 1.2 steals per game and was named first team All-SEC.

On December 12, 2020, Johnson collapsed on the court in a game at Florida State. When he arrived at Tallahassee Memorial Hospital, doctors assessed him to be in critical, but stable condition. After three days in a medically induced coma at Tallahassee Memorial, Johnson was taken back to Gainesville, Florida for further treatment. On December 15, it was reported that he was awake, speaking, and responding to commands. On December 28, head coach Mike White announced that Johnson had rejoined the team as a coach.

Johnson was announced as the honorary starter on Senior Day against Kentucky on March 5, 2022, and received a standing ovation. On May 1, he entered the transfer portal.

=== Kansas State ===
On August 20, 2022, Johnson committed to Kansas State. Johnson was named Big 12 Newcomer of the Year and joined teammate Markquis Nowell on the First Team All-Big 12. Along with Nowell, Johnson led Kansas State to the Elite Eight in the 2023 NCAA men's basketball tournament.

== Professional career ==
On April 24, 2023, Johnson officially declared for the NBA draft. With his heart issues, Johnson still needed to be cleared for contact by the NBA and did not participate in the physical components of the NBA Draft Combine. However, after being cleared by the NBA's Fitness to Play panel on May 26, 2023, Johnson officially kept his name in the draft and began working out for teams.

On June 22, 2023, Johnson was drafted in the second round of the 2023 NBA draft by the Oklahoma City Thunder and on July 7, he signed a two-way contract.

On September 11, 2024, Johnson signed with the Charlotte Hornets, but was waived on October 18. On October 27, he joined the Greensboro Swarm.

== Personal life ==
On March 16, 2022, Alachua County police filed a sworn complaint, claiming that Johnson sexually assaulted a woman, but the case was later dropped. Alachua County court records showed that prosecutors agreed to dismiss the case.

== Career statistics ==
Legend
GP	Games played	GS	Games started	MPG	Minutes per game
FG%	Field goal percentage	3P%	3-point field goal percentage	FT%	Free throw percentage
RPG	Rebounds per game	APG	Assists per game	SPG	Steals per game
BPG	Blocks per game	PPG	Points per game	**Bold**	Career high

=== NBA ===
Year	Team	GP	GS	MPG	FG%	3P%	FT%	RPG	APG	SPG	BPG	PPG
2023–24	Oklahoma City	9	0	7.4	.313	.333	—	1.1	.4	.1	.0	1.2
Career		9	0	7.4	.313	.333	—	1.1	.4	.1	.0	1.2

=== College ===
Year	Team	GP	GS	MPG	FG%	3P%	FT%	RPG	APG	SPG	BPG	PPG
2018–19	Florida	**36**	20	23.8	.470	.365	.643	6.4	1.3	1.1	**0.3**	8.1
2019–20	Florida	31	31	31.3	.544	.380	.768	**7.1**	1.6	**1.2**	**0.3**	14.0
2020–21	Florida	4	4	20.3	**.641**	**.429**	**.786**	4.5	1.3	1.0	0.0	16.0
2021–22	Florida	1	1	0.0	–	–	–	0.0	0.0	0.0	0.0	0.0
2022–23	Kansas State	**36**	**36**	**34.1**	.516	.405	.715	6.8	**2.1**	1.0	0.2	**17.4**
Career		108	92	29.0	.519	.389	.718	6.6	1.6	1.1	0.3	13.1
