= 2022–23 West Virginia Mountaineers men's basketball team =

American college basketball season

2022–23 West Virginia Mountaineers men's basketball

NCAA tournament, First Round
- Conference: Big 12 Conference
- Record: 19–15 (7–11 Big 12)
- Head coach: Bob Huggins (16th season)
- Associate head coach: Vacant; Larry Harrison (until January 12, 2023)
- Assistant coaches: Ron Everhart; Josh Eilert; DerMarr Johnson
- Home arena: WVU Coliseum

2022–23 Big 12 men's basketball standings
	Conf.				Overall
Team	W		L	PCT	W		L	PCT
No. 4 Kansas	13	–	5	.722	28	–	8	.778
No. 5 Texas †	12	–	6	.667	29	–	9	.763
No. 15 Kansas State	11	–	7	.611	26	–	10	.722
No. 11 Baylor	11	–	7	.611	23	–	11	.676
Iowa State	9	–	9	.500	19	–	14	.576
No. 22 TCU	9	–	9	.500	22	–	13	.629
Oklahoma State	8	–	10	.444	20	–	16	.556
West Virginia	7	–	11	.389	19	–	15	.559
Texas Tech	5	–	13	.278	16	–	16	.500
Oklahoma	5	–	13	.278	15	–	17	.469
† 2023 Big 12 tournament winner Rankings from AP poll

The 2022–23 West Virginia Mountaineers men's basketball team represented West Virginia University during the 2022–23 NCAA Division I men's basketball season. The Mountaineers were coached by Bob Huggins, in his 16th and final season as WVU's head coach, and they played their home games at the WVU Coliseum in Morgantown, West Virginia as members of the Big 12 Conference. They finished the season 19–15, 7–11 in Big 12 Play to finish in eighth place. They lost in the quarterfinals of the Big 12 tournament to Kansas. They received an at-large bid to the NCAA tournament as the No. 9 seed in the South region, where they were defeated by Maryland in the First Round.

== Previous season ==
The Mountaineers finished the 2021–22 season 16–17, 4–14 in Big 12 play to finish in last place. They defeated Kansas State in the first round of the Big 12 tournament before losing to Kansas in the quarterfinals.

== Offseason ==
=== Departures ===
Namewshue	Pos.	Number	Height	Weight	Previous School	Hometown	Reason for Leaving
Pauly Paulicap	1	F	6'8"	235	GS Senior	Elmont, NY	Graduated
Gabe Osabuohien	3	F	6'7"	240	GS Senior	Toronto, ON	Graduated
Dimon Carrigan	5	F	6'9"	230	GS Senior	Boston, MA	Graduated
Malik Curry	10	G	6'1"	190	GS Senior	Wilmington, DE	Graduated
Jalen Bridges	11	F	6'7"	225	RS Sophomore	Fairmont, WV	Transferred to Baylor
Taz Sherman	12	G	6'4"	190	GS Senior	Missouri City, TX	Graduated
Isaiah Cottrell	13	F	6'10"	245	RS Freshman	Las Vegas, NV	Transferred to UNLV
Sean McNeil	22	G	6'3"	205	Senior	Union, KY	Graduate transferred to Ohio State
Seny N'diaye	23	F	6'10"	245	Sophomore	Dakar, Senegal	Transferred to USC Upstate
Taj Thweatt	24	F	6'7"	210	Sophomore	Wildwood, NJ	Transferred to Temple
Spencer Macke	30	G	5'11"	175	Junior	Fort Thomas, KY	Walk-on; transferred

=== Incoming transfers ===
Name	Number	Pos.	Height	Weight	Year	Hometown	Previous School
Emmitt Matthews Jr.	1	F	6'7"	215	GS Senior	Tacoma, WA	Washington
Tre Mitchell	3	F	6'9"	220	Senior	Pittsburgh, PA	Texas
Joe Toussaint	5	G	6'0"	190	Senior	Bronx, NY	Iowa
Erik Stevenson	10	G	6'4"	209	GS Senior	Lacey, WA	South Carolina
Mohamed Wague	11	C	6'9"	225	Sophomore	Bronx, NY	Harcum College
Jimmy Bell	15	F	6'10"	270	Senior	Saginaw, MI	Moberly Area CC
Patrick Suemnick	24	F	6'8"	230	Sophomore	Green Bay, WI	Triton College
Jose Perez	55	G	6'5"	220	Senior	Bronx, NY	Manhattan

=== Recruiting classes ===
==== 2022 recruiting class ====
College recruiting information
Name	Hometown	School	Height	Weight	Commit date
Josiah Harris #19 PF	Cleveland, OH	Richmond Heights High School	6 ft 6 in (1.98 m)	185 lb (84 kg)	Mar 31, 2021
Josiah Harris #19 PF	Recruit ratings: Rivals: 247Sports: ESPN: (81)				
Josiah Davis #34 PG	Kitchener, ON	Teays Valley Christian School	6 ft 3 in (1.91 m)	170 lb (77 kg)	Feb 22, 2021
Josiah Davis #34 PG	Recruit ratings: Rivals: 247Sports: ESPN: (80)				
Overall recruit ranking:
Note: In many cases, Scout, Rivals, 247Sports, On3, and ESPN may conflict in their listings of height and weight.; In these cases, the average was taken. ESPN grades are on a 100-point scale.; Sources: "2022 Team Ranking". Rivals.

== Roster ==
2022–23 West Virginia Mountaineers men's basketball team
Players
Coaches

Pos.	#	Name	Height	Weight	Year	Previous school	Hometown
G	0	Kedrian Johnson	6 ft 3 in (1.91 m)	185 lb (84 kg)	GS	Temple College	Dallas, TX
F	1	Emmitt Matthews Jr.	6 ft 7 in (2.01 m)	215 lb (98 kg)	GS	Washington	Tacoma, WA
G	2	Kobe Johnson	6 ft 3 in (1.91 m)	210 lb (95 kg)	So	Canton HS	Canton, OH
C	3	Tre Mitchell	6 ft 9 in (2.06 m)	225 lb (102 kg)	Sr	Texas	Pittsburgh, PA
F	4	Jamel King	6 ft 7 in (2.01 m)	190 lb (86 kg)	So	Bella Vista Prep	Uniontown, AL
G	5	Joe Toussaint	6 ft 0 in (1.83 m)	190 lb (86 kg)	Sr	Iowa	Bronx, NY
G	10	Erik Stevenson	6 ft 4 in (1.93 m)	205 lb (93 kg)	GS	South Carolina	Lacey, WA
F	11	Mohamed Wague	6 ft 10 in (2.08 m)	225 lb (102 kg)	So	Harcum College	Bronx, NY
G	12	Josiah Davis	6 ft 3 in (1.91 m)	190 lb (86 kg)	Fr	Teays Valley Christian School (WV)	Kitchener, ON
F	15	Jimmy Bell Jr.	6 ft 10 in (2.08 m)	295 lb (134 kg)	Sr	Moberly Area CC	Saginaw, MI
F	22	Josiah Harris	6 ft 7 in (2.01 m)	210 lb (95 kg)	Fr	Richmond Heights HS	Canton, OH
F	24	Patrick Suemnick	6 ft 8 in (2.03 m)	230 lb (104 kg)	So	Triton College	Green Bay, WI
F	32	James Okonkwo	6 ft 8 in (2.03 m)	230 lb (104 kg)	So	Beckley Prep	Maidenhead, England
G	45	Seth Wilson	6 ft 1 in (1.85 m)	215 lb (98 kg)	So	Lorain HS	Lorain, OH
G	55	Jose Perez	6 ft 5 in (1.96 m)	220 lb (100 kg)	Sr	Manhattan College	Bronx, NY

Head coach

- Bob Huggins (West Virginia)

Assistant coach(es)

- Larry Harrison (Pittsburgh)
- Ron Everhart (Virginia Tech)
- Josh Eilert (Kansas State)

Legend

- (C) Team captain
- (S) Suspended
- (I) Ineligible
- (W) Walk-on
- Injured
- Current redshirt

Roster

== Schedule and results ==
Date time, TV	Rank^{#}	Opponent^{#}	Result	Record	High points	High rebounds	High assists	Site (attendance) city, state
Exhibition
October 28, 2022*; 7:00 p.m., ESPN+		Bowling Green; Charity Exhibition	W 73–57		18 – Stevenson	10 – Stevenson	4 – Toussaint	WVU Coliseum (9,840); Morgantown, WV
Regular season
November 7, 2022*; 7:00 p.m., ESPN+		Mount St. Mary's	W 76–58	1–0	15 – Matthews	9 – Wague	5 – Matthews	WVU Coliseum (9,960); Morgantown, WV
November 11, 2022*; 7:00 p.m., ACCNX/ESPN+		at Pittsburgh; Backyard Brawl	W 81–56	2–0	18 – Toussaint	6 – Mitchell	5 – Toussaint	Petersen Events Center (10,827); Pittsburgh, PA
November 15, 2022*; 7:00 p.m., ESPN+		Morehead State	W 75–57	3–0	21 – Mitchell	8 – Bell	3 – Stevenson	WVU Coliseum (9,417); Morgantown, WV
November 18, 2022*; 7:00 p.m., ESPN+		Penn	W 92–58	4–0	21 – Stevenson	5 – Okonkwo	5 – Toussaint	WVU Coliseum (9,875); Morgantown, WV
November 24, 2022*; 10:00 p.m., ESPN2		vs. No. 24 Purdue; Phil Knight Legacy Quarterfinals	L 68–80	4–1	17 – Stevenson	5 – Tied	4 – Toussaint	Veterans Memorial Coliseum; Portland, OR
November 25, 2022*; 9:00 p.m., ESPNews		vs. Portland State; Phil Knight Legacy Consolation Round	W 89–71	5–1	16 – Mitchell	5 – Ke. Johnson	4 – Matthews	Moda Center; Portland, OR
November 27, 2022*; 8:30 pm, ESPNU		vs. Florida; Phil Knight Legacy 5th Place Game	W 84–55	6–1	17 – Mitchell	9 – Wague	3 – Toussaint	Chiles Center (1,016); Portland, OR
December 3, 2022*; 6:30 p.m., FS1		at Xavier; Big East–Big 12 Battle	L 74–84	6–2	16 – Stevenson	6 – Bell	4 – Tied	Cintas Center (10,460); Cincinnati, OH
December 7, 2022*; 7:00 p.m., ESPNU		Navy	W 85–64	7–2	19 – Mitchell	7 – Stevenson	7 – Toussaint	WVU Coliseum (10,277); Morgantown, WV
December 10, 2022*; 6:00 p.m., ESPN+		UAB	W 81–70	8–2	17 – Ke. Johnson	9 – Matthews	5 – Mitchell	WVU Coliseum (12,182); Morgantown, WV
December 18, 2022*; 5:00 p.m., ESPN+		Buffalo	W 96–78	9–2	22 – Stevenson	10 – Bell	7 – Ke. Johnson	WVU Coliseum (10,689); Morgantown, WV
December 22, 2022*; 6:00 p.m., ESPN+		Stony Brook	W 75–64	10–2	18 – Ke. Johnson	6 – Bell	4 – Stevenson	WVU Coliseum (10,535); Morgantown, WV
December 31, 2022; 7:00 p.m., ESPN+	No. 24	at Kansas State	L 76–82 ^{OT}	10–3 (0–1)	16 – Mitchell	13 – Mitchell	7 – Ke. Johnson	Bramlage Coliseum (8,199); Manhattan, KS
January 2, 2023; 7:00 p.m., ESPNU		at Oklahoma State	L 60–67	10–4 (0–2)	17 – Stevenson	9 – Bell	2 – Tied	Gallagher-Iba Arena (6,134); Stillwater, OK
January 7, 2023; 6:00 p.m., ESPN+		No. 3 Kansas	L 62–76	10–5 (0–3)	15 – Mitchell	6 – Okonkwo	5 – Toussaint	WVU Coliseum (14,135); Morgantown, WV
January 11, 2023; 7:00 p.m., ESPN+		Baylor	L 78–83	10–6 (0–4)	20 – Toussaint	15 – Mitchell	6 – Ke. Johnson	WVU Coliseum (11,815); Morgantown, WV
January 14, 2023; 12:00 p.m., ESPN2		at Oklahoma	L 76–77	10–7 (0–5)	16 – Mitchell	6 – Bell	3 – Tied	Lloyd Noble Center (7,756); Norman, OK
January 18, 2023; 7:00 p.m., ESPN+		No. 14 TCU	W 74–65	11–7 (1–5)	20 – Ke. Johnson	12 – Bell	4 – Stevenson	WVU Coliseum (11,402); Morgantown, WV
January 21, 2023; 6:00 p.m., ESPN		No. 7 Texas	L 61–69	11–8 (1–6)	22 – Ke. Johnson	8 – Mitchell	2 – Tied	WVU Coliseum (14,141); Morgantown, WV
January 25, 2023; 7:00 p.m., ESPNU		at Texas Tech	W 76–61	12–8 (2–6)	22 – Toussaint	10 – Tied	4 – Stevenson	United Supermarkets Arena (11,802); Lubbock, TX
January 28, 2023*; 12:00 p.m., ESPN		No. 15 Auburn; Big 12/SEC Challenge	W 80–77	13–8	31 – Stevenson	7 – Bell	6 – Ke. Johnson	WVU Coliseum (14,116); Morgantown, WV
January 31, 2023; 9:00 p.m., ESPNU		at No. 15 TCU	L 72–76	13–9 (2–7)	17 – Stevenson	6 – Tied	4 – Tied	Schollmaier Arena (7,444); Fort Worth, TX
February 4, 2023; 8:00 p.m., ESPN2		Oklahoma	W 93–61	14–9 (3–7)	34 – Stevenson	10 – Okonkwo	3 – Stevenson	WVU Coliseum (14,022); Morgantown, WV
February 8, 2023; 7:00 p.m., ESPN2		No. 11 Iowa State	W 76–71	15–9 (4–7)	22 – Ke. Johnson	9 – Okonkwo	6 – Ke. Johnson	WVU Coliseum (11,573); Morgantown, WV
February 11, 2023; 12:00 p.m., ESPN2		at No. 5 Texas	L 60–94	15–10 (4–8)	13 – Matthews Jr	6 – Stevenson	3 – Johnson	Moody Center (10,763); Austin, TX
February 13, 2023; 9:00 p.m., ESPN2		at No. 9 Baylor	L 67–79	15–11 (4–9)	17 – Matthews Jr.	5 – Tied	6 – Johnson	Ferrell Center (9,811); Waco, TX
February 18, 2023; 12:00 p.m., ESPNU		Texas Tech	L 62–68	15–12 (4–10)	27 – Stevenson	9 – Mitchell	4 – Tied	WVU Coliseum (13,940); Morgantown, WV
February 20, 2023; 7:00 p.m., ESPN2		Oklahoma State	W 85–67	16–12 (5–10)	23 – Stevenson	5 – Tied	4 – Toussaint	WVU Coliseum (11,874); Morgantown, WV
February 25, 2023; 4:00 p.m., ESPN		at No. 3 Kansas	L 74–76	16–13 (5–11)	23 – Stevenson	7 – Mitchell	4 – Stevenson	Allen Fieldhouse (16,300); Lawrence, KS
February 27, 2023; 9:00 p.m., ESPN2		at Iowa State	W 72–69	17–13 (6–11)	23 – Stevenson	7 – Toussaint	5 – Ke. Johnson	Hilton Coliseum (13,575); Ames, IA
March 4, 2023; 2:00 p.m., ESPN+		No. 11 Kansas State	W 89–81	18–13 (7–11)	27 – Stevenson	6 – Tied	6 – Ke. Johnson	WVU Coliseum (14,111); Morgantown, WV
Big 12 tournament
March 8, 2023; 7:00 p.m., ESPNU	(8)	vs. (9) Texas Tech; First round	W 78–62	19–13	20 – Ke. Johnson	9 – Mitchell	6 – Stevenson	T-Mobile Center; Kansas City, MO
March 9, 2023; 3:00 p.m., ESPN	(8)	vs. (1) No. 3 Kansas; Quarterfinals	L 61–78	19–14	13 – Stevenson	7 – Mitchell	4 – Toussaint	T-Mobile Center (18,034); Kansas City, MO
NCAA tournament
March 16, 2023*; 12:15 pm, CBS	(9 S)	vs. (8 S) Maryland; First Round	L 65–67	19–15	27 – Johnson	6 – Tied	2 – Okonkwo	Legacy Arena (15,126); Birmingham, AL
*Non-conference game. ^{#}Rankings from AP Poll. (#) Tournament seedings in parentheses. S=South. All times are in Eastern Time.

== Rankings ==
Ranking movements Legend: ██ Increase in ranking ██ Decrease in ranking — = Not ranked RV = Received votes
	Week																			
Poll	Pre	1	2	3	4	5	6	7	8	9	10	11	12	13	14	15	16	17	18	Final
AP	—	—	RV	RV	RV	RV	RV	24	RV	—	—	—	RV	RV						Not released
Coaches	—	—	RV	RV	RV	RV	RV	24	RV	—	—	—	—	RV						

*AP does not release post-NCAA Tournament rankings.
