= 2022–23 Baylor Bears men's basketball team =

American college basketball season

2022–23 Baylor Bears men's basketball

NCAA tournament, Second Round
- Conference: Big 12 Conference

Ranking
- Coaches: No. 19
- AP: No. 11
- Record: 23–11 (11–7 Big 12)
- Head coach: Scott Drew (20th season)
- Associate head coach: Alvin Brooks III (7th season); John Jakus (6th season)
- Assistant coach: Jared Nuness (1st season)
- Offensive scheme: Motion
- Base defense: No-Middle
- Home arena: Ferrell Center

2022–23 Big 12 men's basketball standings
	Conf.				Overall
Team	W		L	PCT	W		L	PCT
No. 4 Kansas	13	–	5	.722	28	–	8	.778
No. 5 Texas †	12	–	6	.667	29	–	9	.763
No. 15 Kansas State	11	–	7	.611	26	–	10	.722
No. 11 Baylor	11	–	7	.611	23	–	11	.676
Iowa State	9	–	9	.500	19	–	14	.576
No. 22 TCU	9	–	9	.500	22	–	13	.629
Oklahoma State	8	–	10	.444	20	–	16	.556
West Virginia	7	–	11	.389	19	–	15	.559
Texas Tech	5	–	13	.278	16	–	16	.500
Oklahoma	5	–	13	.278	15	–	17	.469
† 2023 Big 12 tournament winner Rankings from AP poll

The 2022–23 Baylor Bears men's basketball team represented Baylor University in the 2022–23 NCAA Division I men's basketball season, which was the Bears' 117th basketball season. The Bears, members of the Big 12 Conference, played their home games at the Ferrell Center in Waco, Texas. They were led by 20th-year head coach Scott Drew. They finished the season 23–11, 11–7 in Big 12 Play to finish a tie for 3rd place. They lost in the quarterfinals of the Big 12 Tournament to Iowa State. They received an at-large bid to the NCAA Tournament where they defeated UC Santa Barbara in the First Round before losing in the Second Round to Creighton.

== Previous season ==
The Bears finished the 2021–22 season 27–7, 14–4 in Big 12 play to finish a tie for the regular season championship. They lost in the quarterfinals of the Big 12 tournament to Oklahoma. They received an at-large bid to the NCAA tournament as the No. 1 seed in the East Region, where they defeated Norfolk State in the first round before getting upset in the second round by North Carolina.

== Offseason ==
=== Departures ===
Baylor Departures
Name	Number	Pos.	Height	Weight	Year	Hometown	Reason for Departure
Jeremy Sochan	1	F	6'9"	230	Freshman	Milton Keynes, England	Declared for 2022 NBA draft
Kendall Brown	2	G/F	6'8"	205	Freshman	Cottage Grove, MN	Declared for 2022 NBA draft
James Akinjo	11	G	6'1"	190	Senior	Oakland, CA	Graduated/went undrafted in 2022 NBA draft
Mitchell Paul	14	G	6'0"	175	Senior	Leawood, KS	Walk-on; graduated
Kijana Love	21	G	6'1"	170	Senior	Universal City, TX	Walk-on; graduated
Matthew Mayer	24	G/F	6'9"	225	Senior	Austin, TX	Graduated
Dain Dainja	42	F	6'9"	270	RS Freshman	Brooklyn Park, MN	Mid-season transferred to Illinois

=== Incoming transfers ===
Incoming transfers
Name	Number	Pos.	Height	Weight	Year	Hometown	Previous School
Jalen Bridges	11	F	6'7"	225	RS Junior	Fairmont, WV	West Virginia
Dantwan Grimes	12	G	6'1"	175	Sophomore	Ocala, FL	Kilgore College
Caleb Lohner	33	F	6"8"	235	Sophomore	Dallas, TX	BYU

=== Recruiting classes ===
==== 2022 recruiting class ====
College recruiting information
Name	Hometown	School	Height	Weight	Commit date
Keyonte George #4 SG	Bradenton, FL	IMG Academy	6 ft 3 in (1.91 m)	185 lb (84 kg)	Aug 8, 2021
Keyonte George #4 SG	Recruit ratings: Scout: Rivals: 247Sports: ESPN: (93)				
Joshua Ojianwuna; C	Canberra, AUS	NBA Global Academy	6 ft 10 in (2.08 m)	230 lb (100 kg)	Sep 22, 2021
Joshua Ojianwuna; C	Recruit ratings: Scout: Rivals: 247Sports: ESPN: (80)				
Overall recruit ranking: Rivals: 14 247Sports: 10
Note: In many cases, Scout, Rivals, 247Sports, On3, and ESPN may conflict in their listings of height and weight.; In these cases, the average was taken. ESPN grades are on a 100-point scale.; Sources: "Baylor 2022 Basketball Commitments". Rivals.; "2022 Baylor Bears Recruiting Class". ESPN.; "2022 Team Ranking". Rivals.

==== 2023 recruiting class ====
College recruiting information (2023)
Name	Hometown	School	Height	Weight	Commit date
Ja'Kobe Walter #2 SG	McKinney, TX	Link Academy	6 ft 5 in (1.96 m)	185 lb (84 kg)	Jun 22, 2022
Ja'Kobe Walter #2 SG	Recruit ratings: Scout: Rivals: 247Sports: ESPN: (91)				
Miro Little; PG	Bel Aire, KS	Sunrise Christian Academy	6 ft 4 in (1.93 m)	185 lb (84 kg)	Apr 15, 2022
Miro Little; PG	Recruit ratings: Scout: Rivals: 247Sports: ESPN: (82)				
Overall recruit ranking: Rivals: 14 247Sports: 10
Note: In many cases, Scout, Rivals, 247Sports, On3, and ESPN may conflict in their listings of height and weight.; In these cases, the average was taken. ESPN grades are on a 100-point scale.; Sources: "Baylor 2023 Basketball Commitments". Rivals.; "2023 Baylor Bears Recruiting Class". ESPN.; "2023 Team Ranking". Rivals.

==== 2024 recruiting class ====
College recruiting information (2024)
Name	Hometown	School	Height	Weight	Commit date
Jason Asemota #4 SF	Phoenix, AZ	Hillcrest Prep	6 ft 9 in (2.06 m)	200 lb (91 kg)	Aug 27, 2022
Jason Asemota #4 SF	Recruit ratings: Scout: Rivals: 247Sports: ESPN: (89)				
Overall recruit ranking: Rivals: 14 247Sports: 10
Note: In many cases, Scout, Rivals, 247Sports, On3, and ESPN may conflict in their listings of height and weight.; In these cases, the average was taken. ESPN grades are on a 100-point scale.; Sources: "Baylor 2024 Basketball Commitments". Rivals.; "2024 Baylor Bears Recruiting Class". ESPN.; "2024 Team Ranking". Rivals.

== Roster ==
2022–23 Baylor Bears men's basketball team
Players
Coaches

Pos.	#	Name	Height	Weight	Year	Previous school	Hometown
F	0	Flo Thamba	6 ft 10 in (2.08 m)	245 lb (111 kg)	RS Sr	Mountain Mission (VA)	Kinshasa, DR Congo
G	1	Keyonte George	6 ft 4 in (1.93 m)	185 lb (84 kg)	Fr	IMG Academy	Lewisville, TX
G	2	Jake Younkin (W)	6 ft 3 in (1.91 m)	195 lb (88 kg)	Jr	Cincinnati Hills	Loveland, OH
G	3	Dale Bonner	6 ft 2 in (1.88 m)	170 lb (77 kg)	Sr	Shaker Heights; Fairmont State	Shaker Heights, OH
G	4	LJ Cryer	6 ft 1 in (1.85 m)	185 lb (84 kg)	Jr	Morton Ranch	Katy, TX
G/F	5	Jordan Turner	6 ft 8 in (2.03 m)	195 lb (88 kg)	RS Jr	Sunrise Christian Academy (KS)	Houston, TX
G	10	Adam Flagler	6 ft 3 in (1.91 m)	180 lb (82 kg)	RS Sr	Presbyterian	Duluth, GA
F	11	Jalen Bridges	6 ft 7 in (2.01 m)	225 lb (102 kg)	RS Jr	West Virginia	Fairmont, WV
G	13	Langston Love	6 ft 5 in (1.96 m)	210 lb (95 kg)	RS Fr	Montverde Academy (FL)	Universal City, TX
F	15	Josh Ojianwuna	6 ft 10 in (2.08 m)	230 lb (104 kg)	Fr	NBA Global Academy	Asaba, Nigeria
F	20	Austin Sacks (W)	6 ft 7 in (2.01 m)	200 lb (91 kg)	Jr	Santa Clara	Encino, CA
F	23	Jonathan Tchamwa Tchatchoua	6 ft 8 in (2.03 m)	245 lb (111 kg)	RS Sr	UNLV	Douala, Cameroon
F	32	Zach Loveday	7 ft 0 in (2.13 m)	215 lb (98 kg)	Jr	Huntington Prep (WV)	Gallipolis, OH
F	33	Caleb Lohner	6 ft 8 in (2.03 m)	235 lb (107 kg)	Jr	BYU	Dallas, TX

Head coach

- Scott Drew (Butler)

Assistant coach(es)

- Alvin Brooks III (Idaho State)
- John Jakus (Trinity International)
- Jared Nuness (Valparaiso)

Legend

- (C) Team captain
- (S) Suspended
- (I) Ineligible
- (W) Walk-on
- Injured
- Current redshirt

Roster

== Schedule and results ==
Date time, TV	Rank^{#}	Opponent^{#}	Result	Record	High points	High rebounds	High assists	Site (attendance) city, state
Regular season
November 7, 2022*; 11:00 a.m., ESPN+	No. 5т	Mississippi Valley State	W 117–53	1–0	21 – Flagler	10 – Thamba	8 – Flagler	Ferrell Center (10,284); Waco, TX
November 11, 2022*; 7:00 p.m., ESPN+	No. 5т	Norfolk State; Continental Tire Main Event campus site game	W 87–70	2–0	23 – George	7 – Ojianwuna	7 – George	Ferrell Center (9,728); Waco, TX
November 14, 2022*; 7:00 p.m., ESPN+	No. 5	Northern Colorado	W 95–62	3–0	20 – Cryer	10 – Lohner	10 – Flagler	Ferrell Center (8,548); Waco, TX
November 18, 2022*; 6:00 p.m., ESPN2	No. 5	vs. No. 16 Virginia; Continental Tire Main Event semifinal	L 79–86	3–1	20 – George	5 – Tied	7 – Flagler	T-Mobile Arena (7,678); Paradise, NV
November 20, 2022*; 4:30 p.m., ESPN	No. 5	vs. No. 8 UCLA; Continental Tire Main Event 3rd place game	W 80–75	4–1	28 – Cryer	6 – 2 tied	4 – Flagler	T-Mobile Arena; Paradise, NV
November 23, 2022*; 3:00 p.m., ESPN+	No. 7	McNeese State	W 89–60	5–1	17 – George	7 – Bridges	12 – Bonner	Ferrell Center (8,181); Waco, TX
November 29, 2022*; 7:30 p.m., FS1	No. 6	at Marquette; Big East–Big 12 Battle	L 70–96	5–2	19 – Cryer	6 – Flagler	5 – Flagler	Fiserv Forum (14,022); Milwaukee, WI
December 2, 2022*; 7:00 p.m., Peacock	No. 6	vs. No. 14 Gonzaga	W 64–63	6–2	18 – George	8 – Thamba	3 – Bonner	Sanford Pentagon (3,448); Sioux Falls, SD
December 6, 2022*; 7:00 p.m., ESPN+	No. 12	Tarleton State	W 80–57	7–2	22 – George	8 – Bridges	6 – George	Ferrell Center (8,527); Waco, TX
December 18, 2022*; 9:00 p.m., ESPN2	No. 11	vs. Washington State; Pac-12 Coast-to-Coast Challenge	W 65–59	8–2	19 – George	7 – Bridges	4 – Bonner	American Airlines Center (4,200); Dallas, TX
December 20, 2022*; 7:00 p.m., ESPN+	No. 12	Northwestern State	W 58–48	9–2	13 – Bridges	8 – Ojianwuna	7 – Bonner	Ferrell Center (8,200); Waco, TX
December 28, 2022*; 7:00 p.m., ESPN+	No. 12	Nicholls	W 85–56	10–2	21 – George	11 – Ojianwuna	6 – Bonner	Ferrell Center (8,577); Waco, TX
December 31, 2022; 1:00 p.m., ESPNU	No. 12	at Iowa State	L 62–77	10–3 (0–1)	20 – Flagler	5 – Thamba	3 – Flagler	Hilton Coliseum (14,267); Ames, IA
January 4, 2023; 8:00 p.m., ESPN2	No. 19	No. 17 TCU	L 87–88	10–4 (0–2)	27 – George	7 – Tied	6 – Flagler	Ferrell Center (8,710); Waco, TX
January 7, 2023; 5:00 p.m., ESPN+	No. 19	Kansas State	L 95–97 ^{OT}	10–5 (0–3)	23 – Flagler	7 – Tied	7 – Flagler	Ferrell Center (9,211); Waco, TX
January 11, 2023; 6:00 p.m., ESPN+		at West Virginia	W 83–78	11–5 (1–3)	32 – George	11 – Bridges	4 – Flagler	WVU Coliseum (11,815); Morgantown, WV
January 14, 2023; 5:00 p.m., ESPN2		Oklahoma State	W 74–58	12–5 (2–3)	16 – Cryer	8 – Tied	8 – Flagler	Ferrell Center (9,616); Waco, TX
January 17, 2023; 8:00 p.m., ESPNU	No. 21	at Texas Tech	W 81–74	13–5 (3–3)	27 – George	6 – Ojianwuna	5 – Flagler	United Supermarkets Arena (14,152); Lubbock, TX
January 21, 2023; 3:00 p.m., ESPN2	No. 21	at Oklahoma	W 62–60	14–5 (4–3)	16 – Flagler	10 – Thamba	5 – Flagler	Lloyd Noble Center (8,808); Norman, OK
January 23, 2023; 8:00 p.m., ESPN	No. 17	No. 9 Kansas	W 75–69	15–5 (5–3)	22 – Cryer	9 – Bridges	3 – Tied	Ferrell Center (10,219); Waco, TX
January 28, 2023*; 3:00 p.m., ESPN	No. 17	Arkansas; Big 12/SEC Challenge	W 67–64	16–5	24 – George	7 – Bridges	3 – George	Ferrell Center (10,627); Waco, TX
January 30, 2023; 8:00 p.m., ESPN	No. 11	at No. 10 Texas	L 71–76	16–6 (5–4)	19 – Cryer	7 – Bridges	4 – Flagler	Moody Center (10,763); Austin, TX
February 4, 2023; 12:00 p.m., CBS	No. 11	Texas Tech	W 89–62	17–6 (6–4)	18 – Bridges	8 – Bridges	8 – Flagler	Ferrell Center (10,343); Waco, TX
February 8, 2023; 8:00 p.m., ESPNU	No. 14	Oklahoma	W 82–72	18–6 (7–4)	23 – George	8 – Bridges	4 – Flagler	Ferrell Center (9,861); Waco, TX
February 11, 2023; 3:00 p.m., ESPN2	No. 14	at No. 17 TCU	W 72–68	19–6 (8–4)	28 – Flagler	7 – Tchamwa Tchatchoua	4 – Flagler	Schollmaier Arena (7,055); Fort Worth, TX
February 13, 2023; 8:00 p.m., ESPN2	No. 9	West Virginia	W 79–67	20–6 (9–4)	26 – Cryer	9 – George	7 – George	Ferrell Center (9,811); Waco, TX
February 18, 2023; 3:00 p.m., ESPN	No. 9	at No. 5 Kansas	L 71–87	20–7 (9–5)	22 – Flagler	6 – Tchamwa Tchatchoua	7 – Flagler	Allen Fieldhouse (16,300); Lawrence, KS
February 21, 2023; 6:00 p.m., ESPN2	No. 9	at No. 14 Kansas State	L 65–75	20–8 (9–6)	23 – George	12 – Tchamwa Tchatchoua	6 – Cryer	Bramlage Coliseum (11,000); Manhattan, KS
February 25, 2023; 1:00 p.m., ESPN	No. 9	No. 8 Texas	W 81–72	21–8 (10–6)	17 – Bridges	12 – Thamba	4 – Tied	Ferrell Center (10,499); Waco, TX
February 27, 2023; 8:00 p.m., ESPN	No. 7	at Oklahoma State	W 74–68	22–8 (11–6)	15 – Tied	8 – Thamba	6 – Flagler	Gallagher-Iba Arena (7,965); Stillwater, OK
March 4, 2023; 11:00 a.m., ESPN2	No. 7	Iowa State	L 58–73	22–9 (11–7)	20 – Flagler	7 – Tchamwa Tchatchoua	2 – Tied	Ferrell Center (10,105); Waco, TX
Big 12 tournament
March 9, 2023; 11:30 a.m., ESPN	(4) No. 10	vs. (5) Iowa State; Quarterfinals	L 72–78	22–10	28 – Bridges	5 – Bridges	4 – Flagler	T-Mobile Center; Kansas City, MO
NCAA tournament
March 17, 2023*; 12:30 pm, TNT	(3 S) No. 11	vs. (14 S) UC Santa Barbara; First Round	W 74–56	23–10	18 – Flagler	9 – Tchamwa Tchatchoua	5 – Flagler	Ball Arena; Denver, CO
March 19, 2023*; 6:10 p.m., TBS	(3 S) No. 11	vs. (6 S) Creighton; Second Round	L 76–85	23–11	30 – Cryer	6 – Bridges	3 – George	Ball Arena; Denver, CO
*Non-conference game. ^{#}Rankings from AP Poll. (#) Tournament seedings in parentheses. S=South. All times are in Central Time.

== Rankings ==
Ranking movements Legend: ██ Increase in ranking ██ Decrease in ranking RV = Received votes т = Tied with team above or below
	Week																			
Poll	Pre	1	2	3	4	5	6	7	8	9	10	11	12	13	14	15	16	17	18	Final
AP	5т	5	7	6	12	11	12	12	19	RV	21	17	11	14	9	9	7	10	11	Not released
Coaches	6	6	7	10	12	11	13	13	16	RV	22	17	11	12	9	10	8	10	11	19

*AP does not release post-NCAA Tournament rankings.
