= 2023 NCAA Men's Basketball All-Americans =

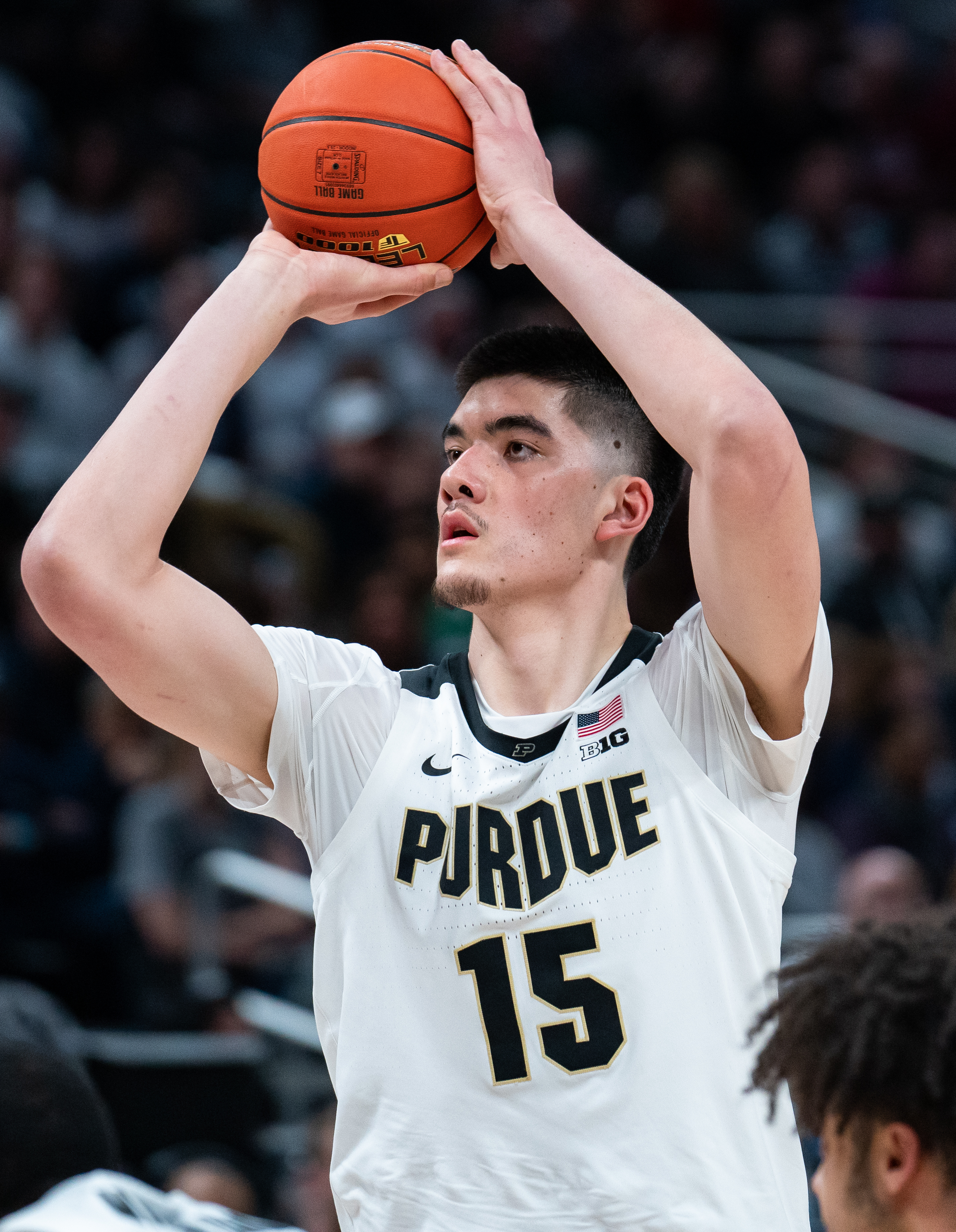
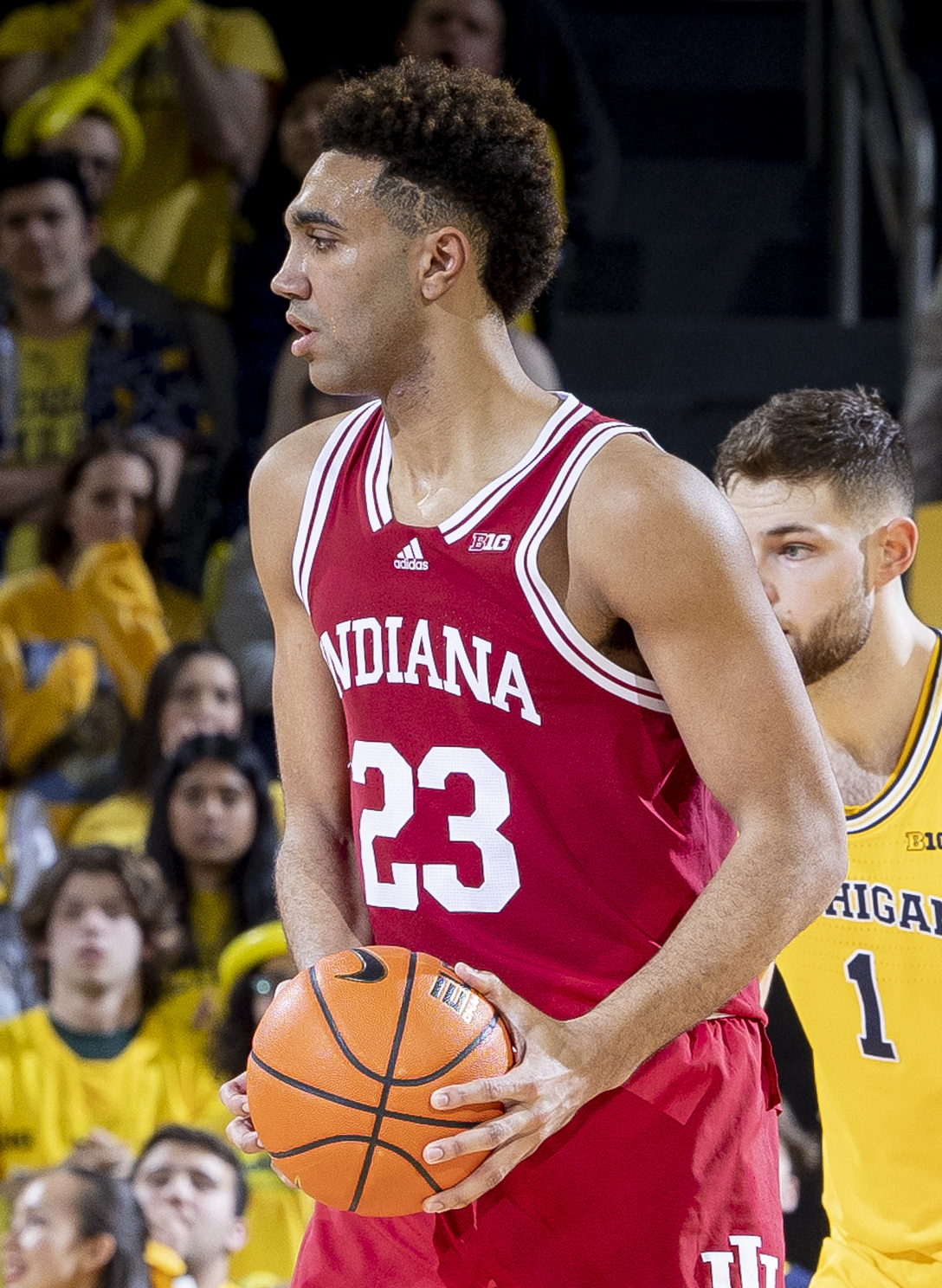
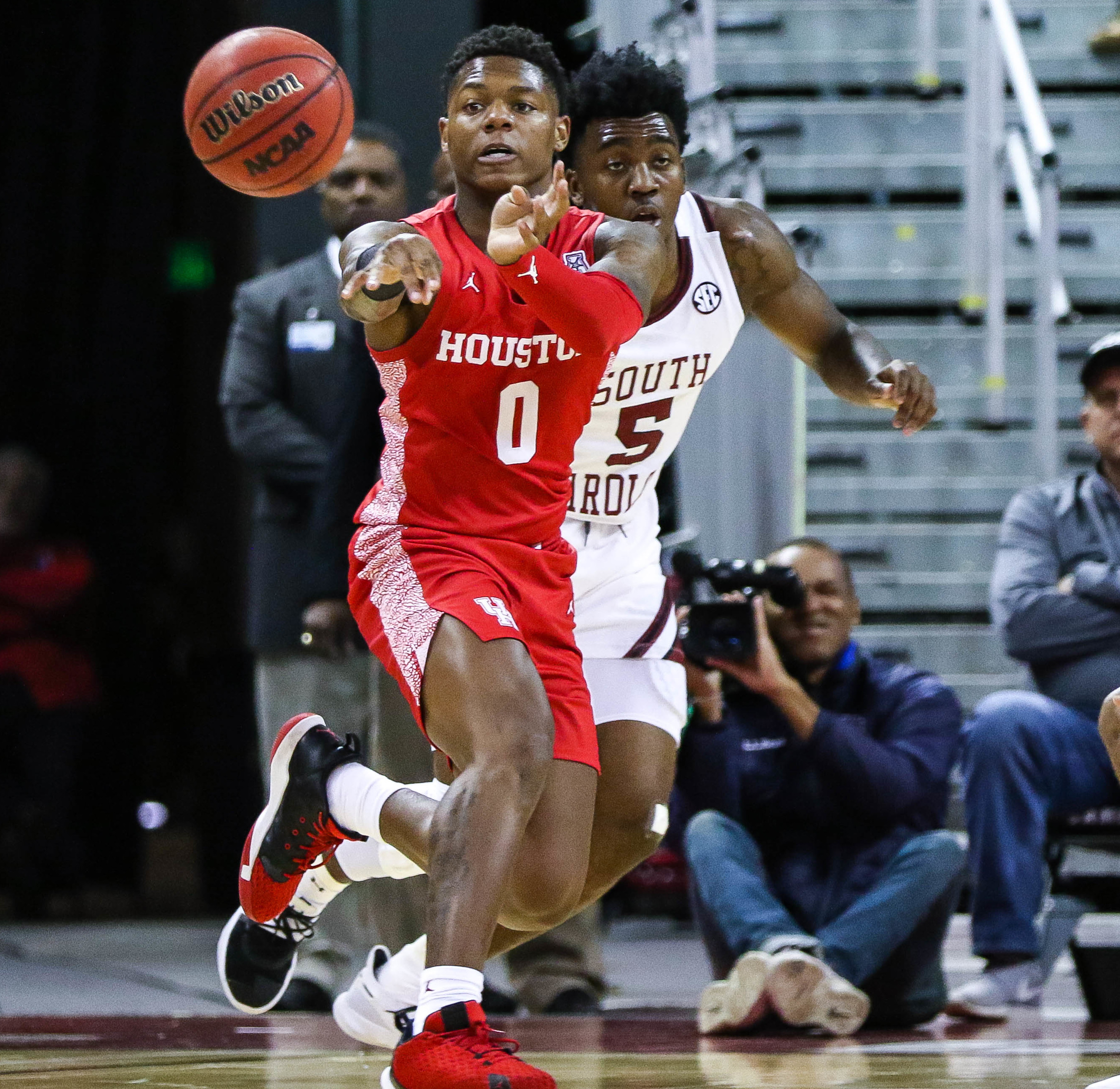
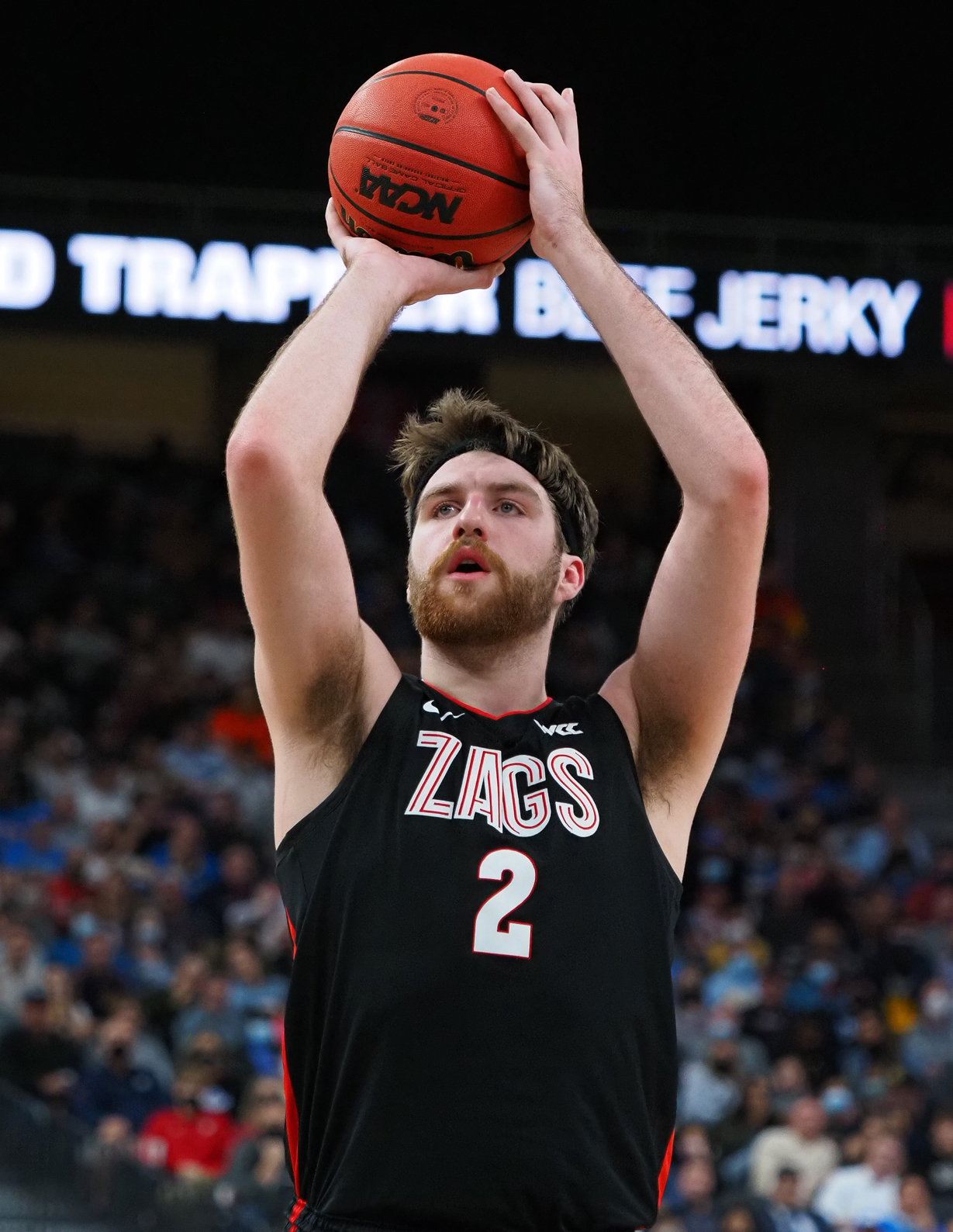
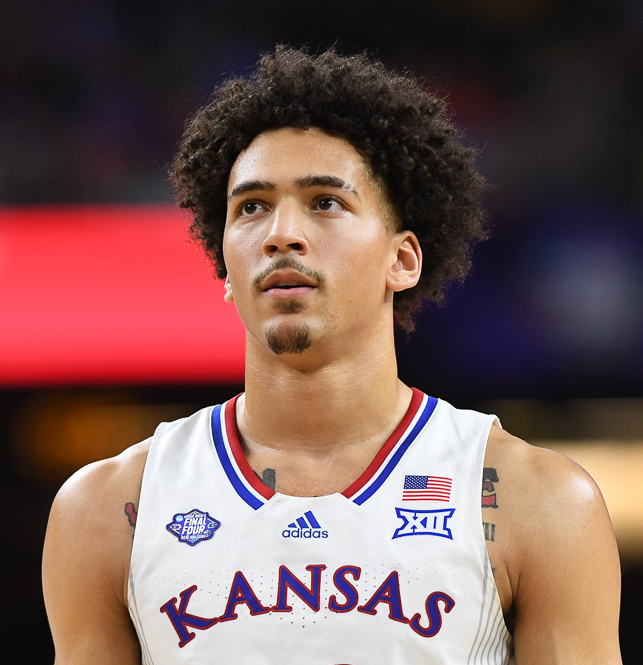
- Members of the 2023 Consensus All-America first team. Clockwise from upper left: Edey, Jackson-Davis, Wilson, Timme and Sasser.
- Awarded for: 2022–23 NCAA Division I men's basketball season

An All-American team is an honorary sports team composed of the best amateur players of a specific season for each team position—who in turn are given the honorific "All-America" and typically referred to as "All-American athletes", or simply "All-Americans". Although the honorees generally do not compete together as a unit, the term is used in U.S. team sports to refer to players who are selected by members of the national media. Walter Camp selected the first All-America team in the early days of American football in 1889. The 2023 NCAA Men's Basketball All-Americans are honorary lists that include All-American selections from the Associated Press (AP), the United States Basketball Writers Association (USBWA), Sporting News (SN), and the National Association of Basketball Coaches (NABC) for the 2022–23 NCAA Division I men's basketball season. All selectors choose three teams, while AP and USBWA also list honorable mention selections.

The Consensus 2023 College Basketball All-American team was determined by aggregating the results of the four major All-American teams as determined by the National Collegiate Athletic Association (NCAA). Since United Press International was replaced by SN in 1997, the four major selectors have been the aforementioned ones. AP has been a selector since 1948, NABC since 1957 and USBWA since 1960. To earn "consensus" status, a player must win honors based on a point system computed from the four different all-America teams. The point system consists of three points for first team, two points for second team and one point for third team. No honorable mention or fourth team or lower are used in the computation. The top five totals plus ties are first team and the next five plus ties are second team.

== 2023 Consensus All-America team ==
PG – Point guard
SG – Shooting guard
PF – Power forward
SF – Small forward
C – Center

Consensus First Team
Player	Position	Class	Team
Zach Edey	C	Junior	Purdue
Trayce Jackson-Davis	PF	Senior	Indiana
Marcus Sasser	G	Senior	Houston
Drew Timme	PF	Senior	Gonzaga
Jalen Wilson	PF	Junior	Kansas

Consensus Second Team
Player	Position	Class	Team
Jaime Jaquez Jr.	SF/SG	Senior	UCLA
Brandon Miller	SF	Freshman	Alabama
Jalen Pickett	PG	Graduate	Penn State
Oscar Tshiebwe	PF/C	Senior	Kentucky
Ąžuolas Tubelis	PF	Junior	Arizona

== Individual All-America teams ==
=== By player ===
Player	School	AP	USBWA	NABC	SN	CP	Notes
Zach Edey	Purdue	1	1	1	1	12	Naismith Player of the Year, Wooden Award, AP Player of the Year, Oscar Robertson Trophy, NABC Player of the Year, Sporting News Player of the Year, Pete Newell Big Man Award, Kareem Abdul-Jabbar Award, Big Ten Player of the Year
Trayce Jackson-Davis	Indiana	1	1	1	1	12	Karl Malone Award
Jalen Wilson	Kansas	1	1	1	1	12	Julius Erving Award, Big 12 Player of the Year
Marcus Sasser	Houston	1	1	1	2	11	Jerry West Award, AAC Player of the Year
Drew Timme	Gonzaga	2	1	1	1	11	WCC co-Player of the Year
Brandon Miller	Alabama	1	2	2	1	10	USBWA National Freshman of the Year, NABC Freshman of the Year, SEC Player of the Year
Jaime Jaquez Jr.	UCLA	2	2	2	2	8	Lute Olson Award, Pac-12 Player of the Year
Ąžuolas Tubelis	Arizona	2	2	2	2	8	
Jalen Pickett	Penn State	2	3	2	2	7	
Oscar Tshiebwe	Kentucky	2	2	2	3	7	
Tyler Kolek	Marquette	3	2	3	2	6	Big East Player of the Year
Markquis Nowell	Kansas State	3	3	3	3	4	Bob Cousy Award
Armando Bacot	North Carolina	3	3		3	3	
Kris Murray	Iowa	3	3		3	3	
Keyontae Johnson	Kansas State	3		3		2	
Max Abmas	Oral Roberts			3		1	Summit League Player of the Year
Antoine Davis	Detroit Mercy		3			1	Horizon League Player of the Year
Kendric Davis	Memphis				3	1	
Isaiah Wong	Miami (FL)			3		1	ACC Player of the Year

=== By team ===
All-America Team
All-America Team	First team		Second team		Third team	
All-America Team	Player	School	Player	School	Player	School
Associated Press	Zach Edey	Purdue	Jaime Jaquez Jr.	UCLA	Armando Bacot	North Carolina
Associated Press	Trayce Jackson-Davis	Indiana	Jalen Pickett	Penn State	Keyontae Johnson	Kansas State
Associated Press	Brandon Miller	Alabama	Drew Timme	Gonzaga	Tyler Kolek	Marquette
Associated Press	Marcus Sasser	Houston	Oscar Tshiebwe	Kentucky	Kris Murray	Iowa
Associated Press	Jalen Wilson	Kansas	Ąžuolas Tubelis	Arizona	Markquis Nowell	Kansas State
USBWA	Zach Edey	Purdue	Jaime Jaquez Jr.	UCLA	Armando Bacot	North Carolina
USBWA	Trayce Jackson-Davis	Indiana	Tyler Kolek	Marquette	Antoine Davis	Detroit Mercy
USBWA	Marcus Sasser	Houston	Brandon Miller	Alabama	Kris Murray	Iowa
USBWA	Drew Timme	Gonzaga	Oscar Tshiebwe	Kentucky	Markquis Nowell	Kansas State
USBWA	Jalen Wilson	Kansas	Ąžuolas Tubelis	Arizona	Jalen Pickett	Penn State
NABC	Zach Edey	Purdue	Jaime Jaquez Jr.	UCLA	Max Abmas	Oral Roberts
NABC	Trayce Jackson-Davis	Indiana	Brandon Miller	Alabama	Keyontae Johnson	Kansas State
NABC	Marcus Sasser	Houston	Jalen Pickett	Penn State	Tyler Kolek	Marquette
NABC	Drew Timme	Gonzaga	Oscar Tshiebwe	Kentucky	Markquis Nowell	Kansas State
NABC	Jalen Wilson	Kansas	Ąžuolas Tubelis	Arizona	Isaiah Wong	Miami (FL)
Sporting News
Sporting News	Zach Edey	Purdue	Jaime Jaquez Jr.	UCLA	Armando Bacot	North Carolina
Sporting News	Trayce Jackson-Davis	Indiana	Tyler Kolek	Marquette	Kendric Davis	Memphis
Sporting News	Brandon Miller	Alabama	Jalen Pickett	Penn State	Kris Murray	Iowa
Sporting News	Drew Timme	Gonzaga	Marcus Sasser	Houston	Markquis Nowell	Kansas State
Sporting News	Jalen Wilson	Kansas	Ąžuolas Tubelis	Arizona	Oscar Tshiebwe	Kentucky

AP Honorable Mention:

- Max Abmas, Oral Roberts
- Tyree Appleby, Wake Forest
- Souley Boum, Xavier
- Tyger Campbell, UCLA
- Marcus Carr, Texas
- Yuri Collins, Saint Louis
- Antoine Davis, Detroit Mercy
- Kendric Davis, Memphis
- Hunter Dickinson, Michigan
- Kyle Filipowski, Duke
- Adam Flagler, Baylor
- Ryan Kalkbrenner, Creighton
- Darius McGhee, Liberty
- Mike Miles Jr., TCU
- Adama Sanogo, UConn
- Wade Taylor IV, Texas A&M
- Isaiah Wong, Miami (FL)

USBWA Honorable Mention:

- Max Abmas, Oral Roberts
- Kendric Davis, Memphis
- Keyontae Johnson, Kansas State
- Isaiah Wong, Miami (FL)

== Academic All-Americans ==
College Sports Communicators (known before the 2022–23 school year as the College Sports Information Directors of America) announced its 15-member 2023 Academic All-America team on March 14, 2023, divided into first, second and third teams, with Ben Vander Plas of Virginia repeating as men's college basketball Academic All-American of the Year.

First Team
Player	School	Class	GPA and major
Dalton Bolon	Charleston	GS	4.00/3.83, Biology (UG) / Biology (G) / Communication (G)
Matt Dentlinger	South Dakota State	GS	3.99/4.00, Mechanical Engineering (UG) / Electrical Eng. (G)
Marcus Domask	Southern Illinois	Sr.	3.99, Sports Administration
JT Shumate	Toledo	Sr.	3.84, Middle Childhood Education
Kahliel Spear	Robert Morris	Sr.	3.91, Economics
Ben Vander Plas	Virginia	GS	3.99/4.00, Communication Studies (UG) / Sports Admin & Mgmt. (G) / Professional Learner at UVA

Second Team
Player	School	Class	GPA and major
Kobe Brown	Missouri	Sr.	3.59, General Studies
Alex Gross	Morehead State	GS	4.00/4.00, Sport Management
Ben Krikke	Valparaiso	Sr.	3.79, Finance
Chris Ledlum	Harvard	Sr.	3.55, Sociology

Third Team
Player	School	Class	GPA and major
Brandon Angel	Stanford	Jr.	3.97, Economics
Josh Bannan	Montana	Jr.	3.92, Economics
Tanner Groves	Oklahoma	GS	3.89/4.80, Master of Arts in Organizational Leadership
Michael Jones	Stanford	GS	3.90, M.S. Statistics
Hunter Tyson	Clemson	GS	3.55/3.90, Sports Communications (UG) / Athletic Leadership (G)
