= Kalib Boone =

American basketball player (born 2000)

No. 22 – MKS Dąbrowa Górnicza
- Position: Power forward
- League: PLK

Personal information
- Born: November 30, 2000 (age 25) Tulsa, Oklahoma, U.S.
- Listed height: 6 ft 9 in (2.06 m)
- Listed weight: 215 lb (98 kg)

Career information
- High school: Memorial (Tulsa, Oklahoma)
- College: Oklahoma State (2019–2023); UNLV (2023–2024)
- NBA draft: 2024: undrafted
- Playing career: 2024–present

Career history
- 2024–2025: Helsinki Seagulls
- 2025–2026: Elitzur Netanya
- 2026: Rip City Remix
- 2026: Valley Suns
- 2026–present: MKS Dąbrowa Górnicza

Career highlights
- Finnish Korisliiga champion (2025); Third-team All-Big 12 (2023)

Kalib Boone (born November 30, 2000) is an American professional basketball player for MKS Dąbrowa Górnicza of the Polish Basketball League (PLK). He played college basketball for the UNLV Running Rebels. Boone has previously played professionally in Finland and Israel as well.

== Professional career ==
In August 2024, Boone signed with Finnish Korisliiga team Helsinki Seagulls. He was named the Korisliiga Player of the Month in February 2025. At the end of the season, he helped Seagulls to win their second Finnish championship title.

On September 13, 2025, Boone joined Elitzur Netanya in Israeli Basketball Premier League.

On August 1, 2026, he signed with MKS Dąbrowa Górnicza of the Polish Basketball League (PLK).
