= 2022–23 Pittsburgh Panthers men's basketball team =

American college basketball season

2022–23 Pittsburgh Panthers men's basketball

NCAA tournament, Second Round
- Conference: Atlantic Coast Conference
- Record: 24–12 (14–6 ACC)
- Head coach: Jeff Capel (5th season)
- Assistant coaches: Tim O'Toole (5th season); Milan Brown (5th season); Jason Capel (5th season)
- Home arena: Petersen Events Center (Capacity: 12,508)

2022–23 ACC men's basketball standings
	Conf.				Overall
Team	W		L	PCT	W		L	PCT
No. 16 Miami (FL)	15	–	5	.750	29	–	8	.784
No. 14 Virginia	15	–	5	.750	25	–	8	.758
Clemson	14	–	6	.700	23	–	11	.676
No. 12 Duke †	14	–	6	.700	27	–	9	.750
Pittsburgh	14	–	6	.700	24	–	12	.667
NC State	12	–	8	.600	23	–	11	.676
North Carolina	11	–	9	.550	20	–	13	.606
Wake Forest	10	–	10	.500	19	–	14	.576
Syracuse	10	–	10	.500	17	–	15	.531
Boston College	9	–	11	.450	16	–	17	.485
Virginia Tech	8	–	12	.400	19	–	15	.559
Florida State	7	–	13	.350	9	–	23	.281
Georgia Tech	6	–	14	.300	15	–	18	.455
Notre Dame	3	–	17	.150	11	–	21	.344
Louisville	2	–	18	.100	4	–	28	.125
† 2023 ACC tournament winner Rankings from AP poll

The 2022–23 Pittsburgh Panthers men's basketball team represented the University of Pittsburgh during the 2022–23 NCAA Division I men's basketball season. The Panthers were led by fifth-year head coach Jeff Capel and played their home games at the Petersen Events Center in Pittsburgh, Pennsylvania as members of the Atlantic Coast Conference. The Panthers finished the season 24–12, 14–6 in ACC play to finish in a three-way tie for third place. This season marked a surprise turnaround from previous seasons; at one point, the Panthers were ranked No. 25 in the nation, their first appearance in the top-25 rankings in seven years. As the No. 5 seed in the ACC tournament, they defeated Georgia Tech before losing to Duke in the quarterfinals. They received an at-large bid to the NCAA tournament, the Panthers' first invitation since 2016. As a No. 11 seed in the Midwest region, they defeated Mississippi State in the First Four. They upset Iowa State in the first round before losing to Xavier in the second round. This marked Pitt's best season since 2014.

== Previous season ==
The Panthers finished the 2021–22 season 11–21, 6–14 in ACC play to finish in a three way tie for eleventh place. As the twelfth seed in the ACC tournament, they lost to thirteenth seed Boston College in the First Round. They were not invited to the NCAA tournament or the NIT.

== Offseason ==
=== Departures ===
Departures
Name	Number	Pos.	Height	Weight	Year	Hometown	Reason for departure
Chris Payton	1	F	6'7"	210	Junior	Bloomington, IL	Transferred to Kent State
Femi Odukale	2	G	6'5"	205	Sophomore	Brooklyn, NY	Transferred to Seton Hall
Noah Collier	3	F	6'9"	220	Sophomore	Mullica Hill, NJ	Transferred to William & Mary
Daniel Oladapo	4	F	6'7"	220	Senior	Bladensburg, MD	Graduate transferred to North Carolina Central
Ithiel Horton	12	G	6'3"	200	(redshirt) Junior	Vauxhall, NJ	Dismissed from the team due to an assault; transferred to UCF
Curtis Aiken Jr.	14	G	6'1"	200	(redshirt) Junior	Pittsburgh, PA	Walk-on; left the team for personal reasons
Mouhamadou Gueye	15	F	6'10"	210	GS Senior	Staten Island, NY	Graduated
Onyebuchi Ezeakudo	31	G	6'1"	200	Senior	Fort Wayne, IN	Walk-on; graduate transferred to Radford
Max Amadasun	35	C	6'9"	230	Sophomore	Dublin, Ireland	Transferred to St. Bonaventure
Chayce Smith	42	G	6'3"	185	Senior	Mount Laurel, NJ	Walk-on; graduate transferred

=== Incoming transfers ===
Incoming transfers
Name	Number	Pos.	Height	Weight	Year	Hometown	Previous school
Nelly Cummings	0	G	6'0"	180	GS Senior	Midland, PA	Colgate
Blake Hinson	2	G/F	6'7"	235	RS Junior	Deltona, FL	Iowa State
Greg Elliott	3	G	6'3"	180	GS Senior	Detroit, MI	Marquette
Fede Federiko	33	F	6'11"		Sophomore	Helsinki, Finland	Northern Oklahoma College

=== Recruiting classes ===
==== 2022 recruiting class ====
College recruiting information
Name	Hometown	School	Height	Weight	Commit date
Dior Johnson #6 PG	Lakewood, CA	Southern California Academy	6 ft 7 in (2.01 m)	205 lb (93 kg)	Jun 13, 2022
Dior Johnson #6 PG	Recruit ratings: Scout: Rivals: 247Sports: ESPN: (88)				
Guillermo Díaz Graham; PF	Bradenton, FL	IMG Academy	6 ft 11 in (2.11 m)	195 lb (88 kg)	May 4, 2022
Guillermo Díaz Graham; PF	Recruit ratings: Scout: Rivals: 247Sports: ESPN: (NR)				
Jorge Díaz Graham; PF	Bradenton, FL	IMG Academy	6 ft 11 in (2.11 m)	195 lb (88 kg)	May 4, 2022
Jorge Díaz Graham; PF	Recruit ratings: Scout: Rivals: 247Sports: ESPN: (NR)				
Overall recruit ranking: Scout: 27 Rivals: 22
Note: In many cases, Scout, Rivals, 247Sports, On3, and ESPN may conflict in their listings of height and weight.; In these cases, the average was taken. ESPN grades are on a 100-point scale.; Sources: "Pittsburgh Panthers". ESPN.; "2022 Team Ranking". Rivals.

==== 2023 recruiting class ====
College recruiting information (2023)
Name	Hometown	School	Height	Weight	Commit date
Bub Carrington #31 SG	Baltimore, MD	St. Frances Academy	6 ft 3 in (1.91 m)	180 lb (82 kg)	Jun 15, 2022
Bub Carrington #31 SG	Recruit ratings: Scout: Rivals: 247Sports: ESPN: (81)				
Marlon Barnes Jr. #36 SG	Lyndhurst, OH	Brush High School	6 ft 4 in (1.93 m)	175 lb (79 kg)	Jan 19, 2022
Marlon Barnes Jr. #36 SG	Recruit ratings: Scout: Rivals: 247Sports: ESPN: (77)				
Overall recruit ranking: Scout: 27 Rivals: 22
Note: In many cases, Scout, Rivals, 247Sports, On3, and ESPN may conflict in their listings of height and weight.; In these cases, the average was taken. ESPN grades are on a 100-point scale.; Sources: "Pittsburgh Panthers". ESPN.; "2023 Team Ranking". Rivals.

== Roster ==
2022–23 Pittsburgh Panthers men's basketball team
Players
Coaches

Pos.	#	Name	Height	Weight	Year	Previous school	Hometown
G	0	Nelly Cummings	6 ft 0 in (1.83 m)	190 lb (86 kg)	GS	Lincoln Park; Colgate	Midland, PA
G	1	Dior Johnson	6 ft 3 in (1.91 m)	185 lb (84 kg)	RS Fr	Southern California Academy	Kingston, NY
G/F	2	Blake Hinson	6 ft 7 in (2.01 m)	255 lb (116 kg)	RS Jr	Sunrise Christian Academy; Iowa State	Deltona, FL
G	3	Greg Elliott	6 ft 3 in (1.91 m)	180 lb (82 kg)	GS	East English Village Prep; Marquette	Detroit, MI
F	4	John Hugley	6 ft 9 in (2.06 m)	265 lb (120 kg)	Jr	Brush HS	Cleveland, OH
F	5	Nate Santos	6 ft 7 in (2.01 m)	215 lb (98 kg)	So	Loomis Chaffee School	Geneva, IL
G	11	Jamarius Burton	6 ft 4 in (1.93 m)	200 lb (91 kg)	RS Sr	Independence HS; Texas Tech	Charlotte, NC
F	13	Aidan Fisch (W)	6 ft 5 in (1.96 m)	185 lb (84 kg)	Sr	Franklin Regional HS	Murrysville, PA
G	22	Nike Sibande	6 ft 4 in (1.93 m)	185 lb (84 kg)	RS Sr	Crispus Attucks HS; Miami (OH)	Indianapolis, IN
G/F	24	William Jeffress	6 ft 7 in (2.01 m)	205 lb (93 kg)	Jr	McDowell HS	Erie, PA
F	25	Guillermo Díaz Graham	7 ft 0 in (2.13 m)	205 lb (93 kg)	Fr	IMG Academy	Canary Islands, Spain
F	31	Jorge Díaz Graham	6 ft 11 in (2.11 m)	195 lb (88 kg)	Fr	IMG Academy	Canary Islands, Spain
C	33	Federiko Federiko	6 ft 11 in (2.11 m)	220 lb (100 kg)	So	First Love Christian Academy (PA); Northern Oklahoma	Helsinki, Finland

Head coach

- Jeff Capel (Duke)

Assistant coach(es)

- Tim O'Toole (Fairfield)
- Milan Brown (Howard)
- Jason Capel (North Carolina)

Legend

- (C) Team captain
- (S) Suspended
- (I) Ineligible
- (W) Walk-on
- Injured
- Current redshirt

Roster

== Schedule and results ==
Date time, TV	Rank^{#}	Opponent^{#}	Result	Record	High points	High rebounds	High assists	Site (attendance) city, state
Exhibition
October 22, 2022*; 11:48 a.m.		Clarion	W 103–51	–	20 – Hinson	10 – Federiko	4 – Cummings	Petersen Events Center; Pittsburgh, PA
November 2, 2022*; 7:00 p.m.		Edinboro	W 92–53	–	29 – Hinson	10 – Federiko	5 – Tied	Petersen Events Center; Pittsburgh, PA
Regular season
November 7, 2022*; 7:00 p.m., ACCNX/ESPN+		UT Martin	W 80–58	1–0	27 – Hinson	13 – Hinson	7 – Tied	Petersen Events Center (6,055); Pittsburgh, PA
November 11, 2022*; 7:00 p.m., ACCNX/ESPN+		West Virginia; Backyard Brawl	L 56–81	1–1	16 – Burton	7 – Tied	3 – Cummings	Petersen Events Center (10,827); Pittsburgh, PA
November 16, 2022*; 6:00 p.m., ESPNU		vs. No. 20 Michigan; Legends Classic semifinals	L 60–91	1–2	14 – Burton	6 – Hinson	5 – Cummings	Barclays Center; Brooklyn, NY
November 17, 2022*; 7:00 p.m., ESPN2		vs. VCU; Legends Classic 3rd place game	L 67–71	1–3	18 – Hinson	7 – Tied	4 – Burton	Barclays Center; Brooklyn, NY
November 20, 2022*; 2:00 p.m., ACCNX/ESPN+		Alabama State	W 73–54	2–3	21 – Hinson	9 – Hugley IV	5 – Cummings	Petersen Events Center (5,558); Pittsburgh, PA
November 22, 2022*; 8:30 p.m., ACCN		Fairleigh Dickinson	W 83–61	3–3	18 – Burton	8 – Sibande	4 – Tied	Petersen Events Center (5,455); Pittsburgh, PA
November 25, 2022*; 7:00 p.m., ACCNX/ESPN+		William & Mary	W 80–64	4–3	17 – Hinson	11 – Hinson	4 – Tied	Petersen Events Center (5,649); Pittsburgh, PA
November 28, 2022*; 9:00 p.m., ESPN2		at Northwestern; ACC–Big Ten Challenge	W 87–58	5–3	22 – Hinson	8 – Hinson	7 – Burton	Welsh–Ryan Arena (2,606); Evanston, IL
December 2, 2022; 7:00 p.m., ACCN		at NC State	W 68–60	6–3 (1–0)	24 – Burton	9 – Elliott	4 – Tied	PNC Arena (12,798); Raleigh, NC
December 7, 2022*; 8:00 p.m., SECN		at Vanderbilt	L 74–75	6–4	20 – Elliott	8 – Burton	5 – Cummings	Memorial Gymnasium (5,616); Nashville, TN
December 10, 2022*; 3:30 p.m., ACCN		Sacred Heart	W 91–66	7–4	24 – Cummings	14 – Federiko	5 – Cummings	Petersen Events Center (6,019); Pittsburgh, PA
December 17, 2022*; 1:00 p.m., ACCN		North Florida	W 82–56	8–4	22 – Federiko	10 – Elliott	7 – Cummings	Petersen Events Center (5,782); Pittsburgh, PA
December 20, 2022; 9:00 p.m., ESPNU		at Syracuse	W 84–82	9–4 (2–0)	25 – Hinson	13 – Hinson	7 – Burton	JMA Wireless Dome (15,417); Syracuse, NY
December 30, 2022; 12:00 p.m., ACCN		No. 25 North Carolina	W 76–74	10–4 (3–0)	31 – Burton	7 – Federiko	7 – Cummings	Petersen Events Center (10,215); Pittsburgh, PA
January 3, 2023; 9:00 p.m., ACCN		No. 11 Virginia	W 68–65	11–4 (4–0)	16 – Tied	11 – Federiko	8 – Cummings	Petersen Events Center (6,464); Pittsburgh, PA
January 7, 2023; 4:00 p.m., ESPN2		Clemson	L 74–75	11–5 (4–1)	28 – Burton	8 – Tied	4 – Tied	Petersen Events Center (10,403); Pittsburgh, PA
January 11, 2023; 7:00 p.m., ACCN		at No. 24 Duke	L 69–77	11–6 (4–2)	16 – Burton	6 – Sibande	6 – Burton	Cameron Indoor Stadium (9,314); Durham, NC
January 14, 2023; 3:00 p.m., ACCN		at Georgia Tech	W 71–60	12–6 (5–2)	21 – Sibande	7 – Federiko	4 – Cummings	McCamish Pavilion (5,325); Atlanta, GA
January 18, 2023; 7:00 p.m., ACCN		at Louisville	W 75–54	13–6 (6–2)	23 – Elliott	8 – G. Diaz Graham	11 – Burton	KFC Yum! Center (11,579); Louisville, KY
January 21, 2023; 3:00 p.m., ACCN		Florida State	L 64–71	13–7 (6–3)	20 – Burton	9 – Hinson	5 – Burton	Petersen Events Center (10,390); Pittsburgh, PA
January 25, 2023; 7:00 p.m., ACCN		Wake Forest	W 81–79	14–7 (7–3)	24 – Hinson	9 – Federiko	9 – Burton	Petersen Events Center (7,660); Pittsburgh, PA
January 28, 2023; 4:00 p.m., ESPNU		No. 20 Miami (FL)	W 71–68	15–7 (8–3)	21 – Hinson	10 – Burton	7 – Burton	Petersen Events Center (12,508); Pittsburgh, PA
February 1, 2023; 7:00 p.m., ACCN		at North Carolina	W 65–64	16–7 (9–3)	21 – Cummings	7 – Sibande	3 – Cummings	Dean Smith Center (20,421); Chapel Hill, NC
February 7, 2023; 7:00 p.m., ACCN		Louisville	W 91–57	17–7 (10–3)	15 – Sibande	6 – Burton	6 – Tied	Petersen Events Center (7,577); Pittsburgh, PA
February 11, 2023; 12:00 p.m., ESPNU		at Florida State	W 83–75	18–7 (11–3)	19 – Tied	13 – Federiko	6 – Burton	Donald L. Tucker Civic Center (5,845); Tallahassee, FL
February 14, 2023; 9:00 p.m., ACCN		Boston College	W 77–58	19–7 (12–3)	21 – Hinson	7 – Tied	8 – Cummings	Petersen Events Center (6,746); Pittsburgh, PA
February 18, 2023; 5:00 p.m., ACCN		at Virginia Tech	L 72–79	19–8 (12–4)	15 – Burton	6 – G. Diaz Graham	8 – Cummings	Cassell Coliseum (8,925); Blacksburg, VA
February 21, 2023; 7:00 p.m., ACCN		Georgia Tech	W 76–68	20–8 (13–4)	22 – Cummings	7 – Federiko	7 – Cummings	Petersen Events Center (9,482); Pittsburgh, PA
February 25, 2023; 5:00 p.m., ACCN		Syracuse	W 99–82	21–8 (14–4)	22 – Hinson	10 – Burton	13 – Cummings	Petersen Events Center (12,508); Pittsburgh, PA
March 1, 2023; 7:00 p.m., ESPNU	No. 25	at Notre Dame	L 81–88	21–9 (14–5)	19 – Tied	13 – Hinson	2 – Tied	Joyce Center (8,582); South Bend, IN
March 4, 2023; 6:00 p.m., ACCN	No. 25	at No. 16 Miami (FL)	L 76–78	21–10 (14–6)	24 – Hinson	5 – Sibande	6 – Cummings	Watsco Center (7,972); Coral Gables, FL
ACC tournament
March 8, 2023; 2:30 p.m., ESPN	(5)	vs. (13) Georgia Tech; Second round	W 89–81	22–10	21 – Burton	9 – Hinson	8 – Burton	Greensboro Coliseum (17,685); Greensboro, NC
March 9, 2023; 2:30 p.m., ESPN2	(5)	vs. (4) No. 21 Duke; Quarterfinals	L 69–96	22–11	17 – Sibande	8 – G. Diaz Graham	3 – Tied	Greensboro Coliseum (13,920); Greensboro, NC
NCAA tournament
March 14, 2023; 9:34 pm, TruTV	(11 MW)	vs. (11 MW) Mississippi State; First Four	W 60–59	23–11	15 – Cummings	5 – Tied	4 – Cummings	UD Arena (12,453); Dayton, OH
March 17, 2023; 3:31 p.m., TruTV	(11 MW)	vs. (6 MW) Iowa State; First Round	W 59–41	24–11	13 – Cummings	8 – Tied	3 – Tied	Greensboro Coliseum (16,150); Greensboro, NC
March 19, 2023; 12:10 p.m., CBS	(11 MW)	vs. (3 MW) No. 13 Xavier; Second Round	L 73–84	24–12	18 – Hinson	9 – Sibande	5 – Cummings	Greensboro Coliseum; Greensboro, NC
*Non-conference game. ^{#}Rankings from AP Poll. (#) Tournament seedings in parentheses. All times are in Eastern Time.

== Rankings ==
Ranking movements Legend: ██ Increase in ranking ██ Decrease in ranking — = Not ranked RV = Received votes
	Week																			
Poll	Pre	1	2	3	4	5	6	7	8	9	10	11	12	13	14	15	16	17	18	Final
AP	—	—	—	—	—	—	—	—	—	RV	—	—	RV	RV	RV	RV	25	RV	—	Not released
Coaches	—	—	—	—	—	—	—	—	—	RV	—	—	RV	RV	RV	RV	25	RV	RV	RV

*AP does not release post-NCAA tournament rankings
^Coaches did not release a Week 2 poll.
