= Markquis Nowell =

American basketball player (born 1999)

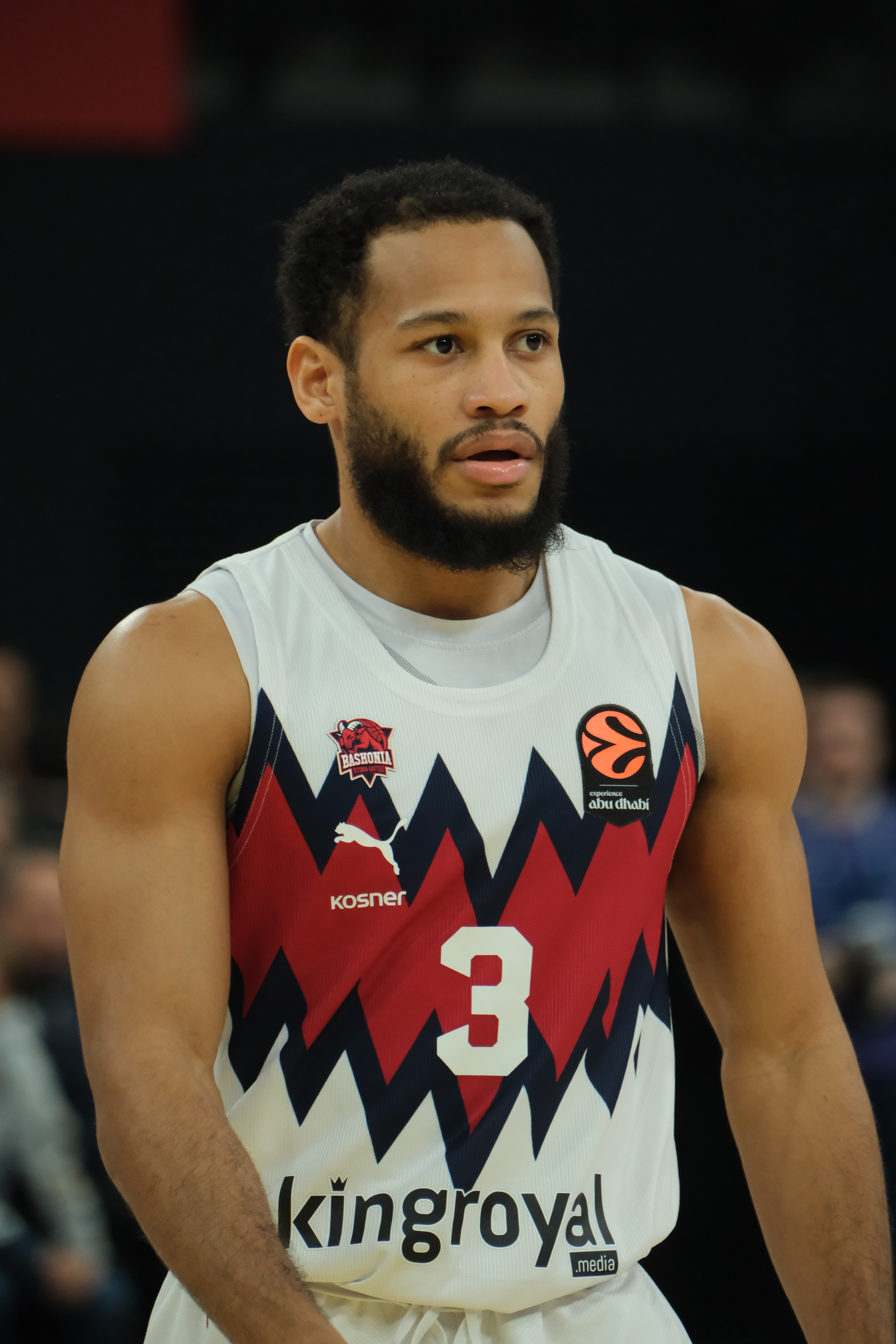
- Nowell with Baskonia in 2026

No. 1 – Laketown Squadron
- Position: Point guard
- League: NBA G League

Personal information
- Born: December 25, 1999 (age 26) New York City, New York, U.S.
- Listed height: 5 ft 7 in (1.70 m)
- Listed weight: 163 lb (74 kg)

Career information
- High school: St. Anthony (Jersey City, New Jersey); Bishop Loughlin (Brooklyn, New York); The Patrick School (Hillside, New Jersey)
- College: Little Rock (2018–2021); Kansas State (2021–2023)
- NBA draft: 2023: undrafted
- Playing career: 2023–present

Career history
- 2023–2024: Toronto Raptors
- 2023–2024: →Raptors 905
- 2024: Raptors 905
- 2024–2025: Rio Grande Valley Vipers
- 2025–2026: Baskonia
- 2026–present: Laketown Squadron

Career highlights
- NBA G League Next Up Game (2024); Spanish cup winner (2026); Third-team All-American – AP, USBWA, NABC, SN (2023); Bob Cousy Award (2023); First-team All-Big 12 (2023); First-team All-Sun Belt (2020); Big 12 All-Defensive Team (2023)
- Stats at NBA.com
- Stats at Basketball Reference

Markquis Morris Nowell (born December 25, 1999) is an American professional basketball player for the Laketown Squadron of the NBA G League. He has appeared in a National Basketball Association game for the 2023–24 Toronto Raptors. He played college basketball for the Kansas State Wildcats and Little Rock Trojans. In high school he played at St. Anthony High School, Bishop Loughlin Memorial High School and The Patrick School.

In 2020, he was first-team All-Sun Belt. He holds the Division I NCAA Tournament single-game assists record, with 19 vs. Michigan State in the 2023 Sweet Sixteen. He won the 2023 Bob Cousy Award. In 2023, he was first-team All-Big 12 and was a third-team 2023 NCAA Men's Basketball All-American.

== High school career ==
Nowell began his high school career at St. Anthony High School in Jersey City, New Jersey, under Hall Of Fame Coach Bob Hurley Sr. After receiving minimum playing time after his freshman year he decided to transfer schools to Bishop Loughlin Memorial High School for his sophomore and junior year, playing alongside Julian and Justin Champagnie. Nowell averaged 19.9 points and 8.1 assists per game as a junior. He transferred to The Patrick School for his senior season and averaged 10.9 points per game despite missing a month with injuries. He received no Division 1 offers out of high school before getting a look from Little Rock.

== College career ==
As a freshman, Nowell averaged 11.1 points, 4.2 assists, 3.2 rebounds and 1.4 steals per game. He averaged 17.2 points, 4.9 assists, and 3.0 rebounds per game as a sophomore. Nowell was named to the First Team All-Sun Belt. He was suspended for two games in January 2020 due to disciplinary reasons. As a junior, Nowell averaged 14.3 points, 6.0 assists, 3.9 rebounds and 2.3 steals per game but opted out of the season in February 2020. Following the season, he transferred to Kansas State.

Nowell averaged 12.4 points and team-highs of 5.0 assists and 2.2 steals per game in the 2021–22 season. He was one of two players to return to Kansas State after Jerome Tang was hired as coach to replace Bruce Weber. On January 10, 2023, Nowell was named Oscar Robertson National Player of the Week by the U.S. Basketball Writers Association after scoring a career-high 36 points to go with nine assists and three steals in a 116–103 win against Texas. He was named to the First Team All-Big 12 as well as the All-Defensive Team. During the NCAA tournament, Nowell scored 17 points and recorded a then career-high 14 assists during a 77–65 first round win over Montana State. On March 19, Nowell scored 27 points and dished out 9 assists in a Second Round win over the Kentucky Wildcats. On March 23, during a Sweet 16 matchup against Michigan State, while playing with a sprained ankle, along with 20 points and 5 steals, Nowell recorded 19 assists in an overtime win, setting a new NCAA Tournament record for assists in a single game. He also battled an ankle injury during the Michigan State game. On March 25, Nowell scored 30 points and 12 assists in a losing effort against Florida Atlantic in the Elite 8 of the NCAA Tournament. During the tournament, he averaged 23.5 points, 13.5 assists and 4.0 steals, and his 54 single-tournament assist total was the third highest in tournament history and the most since Rumeal Robinson posted 56 34 years earlier. He earned Most Outstanding Player honors for the NCAA East Regional. Following the season, he won the Bob Cousy Award.

== Professional career ==
=== Toronto Raptors / Raptors 905 (2023–2024) ===
After going undrafted in the 2023 NBA draft, Nowell signed a two-way contract with the Toronto Raptors on July 3, 2023. On July 15, he recorded 17 points, 12 assists and 3 rebounds in a 108–101 summer league win against the Golden State Warriors. On March 4, 2024, he was waived by Toronto and two days later, he joined Raptors 905.

=== Rio Grande Valley Vipers (2024–2025) ===
On October 1, 2024, Nowell signed with the Houston Rockets, but was waived on October 14. On October 27, he joined the Rio Grande Valley Vipers.

=== Baskonia (2025–2026) ===
On September 20, 2025, Nowell signed with Baskonia of the Spanish Liga ACB and the EuroLeague.

=== Laketown Squadron (2026–present) ===
On September 18, 2026, Nowell signed a training camp contract with the New Orleans Pelicans. He was waived by the Pelicans two days later. On October 21, the returning player rights to Nowell was acquired by the Laketown Squadron.

== Career statistics ==
Legend
GP	Games played	GS	Games started	MPG	Minutes per game
FG%	Field goal percentage	3P%	3-point field goal percentage	FT%	Free throw percentage
RPG	Rebounds per game	APG	Assists per game	SPG	Steals per game
BPG	Blocks per game	PPG	Points per game	**Bold**	Career high

=== NBA ===
Year	Team	GP	GS	MPG	FG%	3P%	FT%	RPG	APG	SPG	BPG	PPG
2023–24	Toronto	1	0	3.5	.000	—	1.000	2.0	2.0	1.0	.0	2.0
Career		1	0	3.5	.000	—	1.000	2.0	2.0	1.0	.0	2.0

=== College ===
Year	Team	GP	GS	MPG	FG%	3P%	FT%	RPG	APG	SPG	BPG	PPG
2019–20	Little Rock	25	18	30.4	.382	.354	.792	3.2	4.2	1.4	0.0	11.1
2019–20	Little Rock	28	26	33.5	**.427**	**.391**	.879	3.0	4.9	2.2	**0.1**	17.2
2020–21	Little Rock	15	8	30.5	.344	.333	.873	**3.9**	6.0	2.3	0.0	14.3
2021–22	Kansas State	27	21	30.4	.386	.307	.829	3.4	5.0	2.2	0.0	12.4
2022–23	Kansas State	**36**	**36**	**36.9**	.386	.355	**.889**	3.5	**8.3**	**2.6**	**0.1**	**17.6**
Career		131	109	32.9	.390	.353	.866	3.4	5.8	2.2	0.0	14.8

== See also ==
- List of shortest players in National Basketball Association history
