= Gabe Kalscheur =

American basketball player (born 1999)

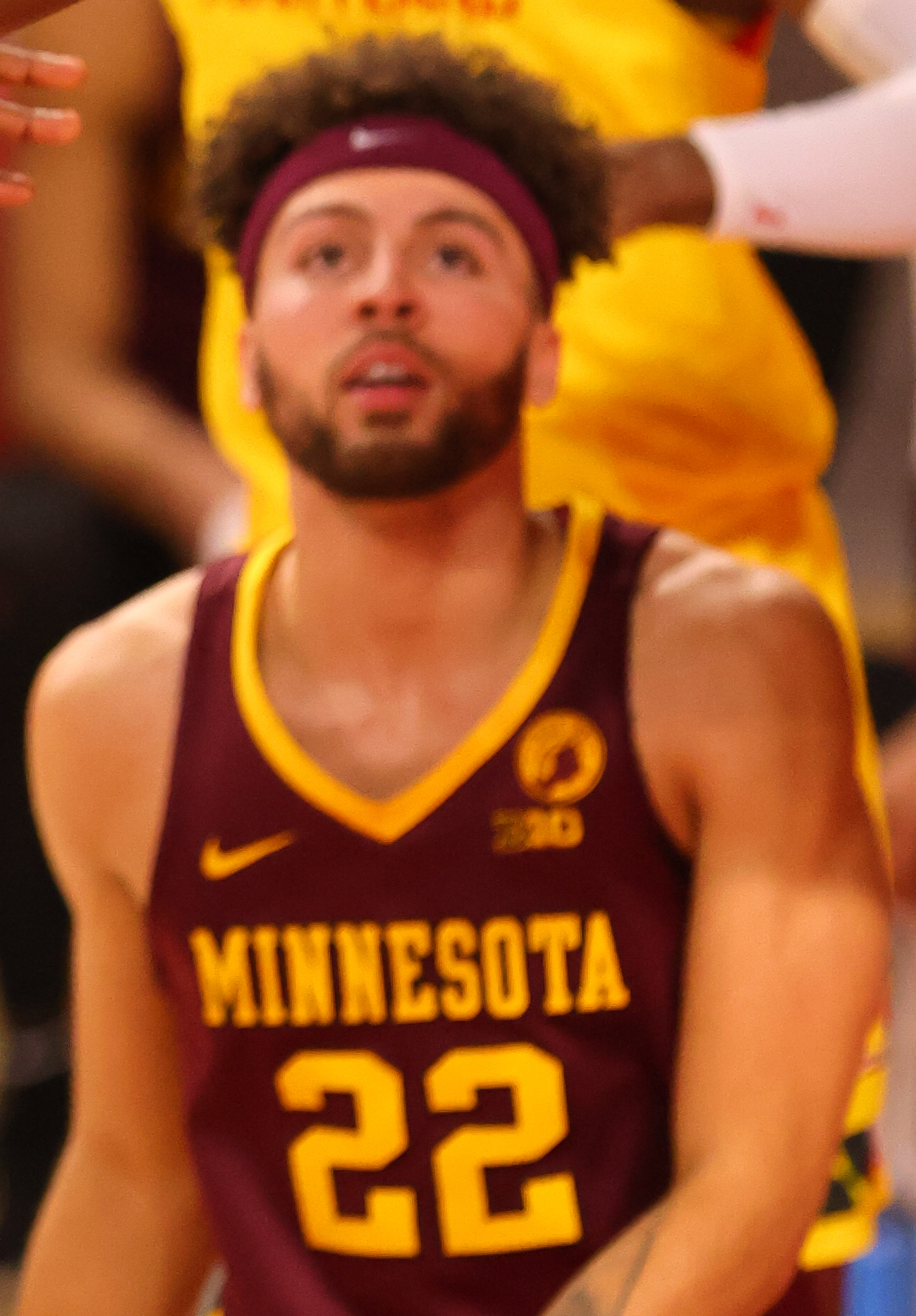
- Kalscheur in 2021

No. 22 – Club Ourense Baloncesto
- Position: Shooting guard
- League: Primera FEB

Personal information
- Born: June 10, 1999 (age 27) Edina, Minnesota, U.S
- Listed height: 6 ft 4 in (1.93 m)
- Listed weight: 200 lb (91 kg)

Career information
- High school: DeLaSalle (Minneapolis, Minnesota)
- College: Minnesota (2018–2021); Iowa State (2021–2023)
- NBA draft: 2023: undrafted
- Playing career: 2023–present

Career history
- 2023–2024: Capital City Go-Go
- 2024: Iowa Wolves
- 2024–2025: Nürnberg Falcons
- 2025–present: Ourense

Career highlights
- Second-team All-Big 12 (2023); Big 12 All-Defensive Team (2023)
- Stats at Basketball Reference

Gabriel Marvin Kalscheur (born May 20, 1999) is an American professional basketball player for Ourense of the Primera FEB. He played college basketball for Minnesota and Iowa State.

== High school career ==
Kalscheur is the son of LeeAnna Kalscheur, who played college basketball at Cal Poly Pomona and Nebraska. He played at DeLaSalle High School and led the team to three state titles. As a senior, Kalscheur averaged 23.2 points, 5.6 rebounds and 2.9 assists per game. He committed to play college basketball at Minnesota, choosing the Golden Gophers over several ACC and Big Ten programs.

== College career ==
As a freshman, Kalscheur averaged 10 points, 2.0 rebounds, and 1.1 assists per game. He averaged 11.6 points, 2.7 rebounds, and 1.5 assists per game as a sophomore. Kalscheur averaged 9.2 points and 2.9 rebounds per game as a junior. Following the season, he transferred to Iowa State after Minnesota coach Richard Pitino was fired. As a senior, Kalscheur averaged 9.6 points, 2.4 rebounds and 1.7 assists per game. He averaged 12.9 points, 2.5 rebounds and 1.6 assists per game in his fifth season. Kalscheur was named to the Second Team All-Big 12 as well as the Big 12 All-Defensive Team.

== Professional career ==
=== Capital City Go-Go (2023–2024) ===
After going undrafted in the 2023 NBA draft, Kalscheur joined the Golden State Warriors for NBA Summer League. He signed with the Washington Wizards on October 21, 2023, only to be waived hours later. Nine days later, Kalscheur joined the Wizards' G-League affiliate, the Capital City Go-Go, and averaged 2.9 points and 0.4 rebounds per game in 18 games before being waived on February 14, 2024.

=== Iowa Wolves (2024) ===
On February 19, 2024, Kalscheur joined the Iowa Wolves from the available player pool.

=== Nürnberg Falcons (2024–2025) ===
On September 16, 2024, Kalscheur signed with Nürnberg Falcons of the ProA.

On July 12, 2025, he signed for Ourense of the Primera FEB.
