= 2023–24 TCU Horned Frogs men's basketball team =

American college basketball season

2023–24 TCU Horned Frogs men's basketball

NCAA tournament, First Round
- Conference: Big 12 Conference
- Record: 21–13 (9–9 Big 12)
- Head coach: Jamie Dixon (8th season)
- Associate head coach: Tony Benford
- Assistant coaches: Duane Broussard; Jamie McNeilly
- Home arena: Schollmaier Arena

2023–24 Big 12 men's basketball standings
	Conf.				Overall
Team	W		L	PCT	W		L	PCT
No. 3т Houston	15	–	3	.833	32	–	5	.865
No. 8 Iowa State †	13	–	5	.722	29	–	8	.784
No. 16 Baylor	11	–	7	.611	24	–	11	.686
Texas Tech	11	–	7	.611	23	–	11	.676
BYU	10	–	8	.556	23	–	11	.676
No. 19 Kansas	10	–	8	.556	23	–	11	.676
Texas	9	–	9	.500	21	–	13	.618
TCU	9	–	9	.500	21	–	13	.618
Oklahoma	8	–	10	.444	20	–	12	.625
Kansas State	8	–	10	.444	19	–	15	.559
Cincinnati	7	–	11	.389	22	–	15	.595
UCF	7	–	11	.389	17	–	16	.515
Oklahoma State	4	–	14	.222	12	–	20	.375
West Virginia	4	–	14	.222	9	–	23	.281
† 2024 Big 12 tournament winner Rankings from AP poll

The 2023–24 TCU Horned Frogs men's basketball team represented Texas Christian University during the 2023–24 NCAA Division I men's basketball season. The team was led by eighth-year head coach Jamie Dixon, and played their home games at Schollmaier Arena in Fort Worth, Texas as a member of the Big 12 Conference.

== Previous season ==
The Horned Frogs finished the 2022–23 season 22–13, 9–9 in Big 12 play to finish in a tie for fifth place. Due to a tiebreaker, as the No. 6 seed in the Big 12 tournament, they defeated Kansas State in the quarterfinals, before losing to Texas in the semifinals. They received an at-large bid to the NCAA tournament as the No. 6 seed in the West Region, where they defeated Arizona State in the first round before losing to Gonzaga in the second round.

== Offseason ==
=== Departures ===
Name	Number	Pos.	Height	Weight	Year	Hometown	Reason for departure
Mike Miles Jr.	1	G	6'2"	195	Junior	Highland Hills, TX	Declare for 2023 NBA draft
PJ Haggerty	3	G	6'3"	183	Freshman	Crosby, TX	Transferred to Tulsa
Eddie Lampkin Jr.	4	C	6'11"	268	Sophomore	Houston, TX	Transferred to Colorado
Damion Baugh	10	G	6'4"	195	Senior	Nashville, TN	Graduated/2023 NBA draft
Rondel Walker	11	G	6'5"	185	Junior	Midwest City, OK	Transferred to North Texas
Shahada Wells	13	G	6'0"	180	Senior	Amarillo, TX	Graduate transferred to McNeese State
Souleymane Doumbia	25	C	6'11"	235	Junior	Abidjan, Ivory Coast	Transferred to Sam Houston State

=== Incoming transfers ===
Name	Number	Pos.	Height	Weight	Year	Hometown	Previous school
Avery Anderson III	3	G	6'3"	158	GS senior	Justin, TX	Oklahoma State
Jameer Nelson Jr.	4	G	6'1"	200	RS senior	Haverford, PA	Delaware
Ernest Udeh Jr.	8	C	6'11"	250	Sophomore	Orlando, FL	Kansas
Trevian Tennyson	11	G	6'4"	180	GS senior	Arlington, TX	Texas A&M–Corpus Christi
Essam Mostafa	44	C	6'9"	250	RS senior	Cairo, Egypt	Coastal Carolina

=== Recruiting classes ===
==== 2023 recruiting class ====
College recruiting
Name	Hometown	School	Height	Weight	Commit date
Jace Posey #22 PF	Houston, TX	Strake Jesuit College Prep	6 ft 4 in (1.93 m)	175 lb (79 kg)	Sep 9, 2022
Jace Posey #22 PF	Recruit ratings: Scout: Rivals: 247Sports: ESPN: (82)				
Isaiah Manning #40 PF	Mansfield, TX	Mansfield Legacy High School	6 ft 7 in (2.01 m)	200 lb (91 kg)	Jul 11, 2022
Isaiah Manning #40 PF	Recruit ratings: Scout: Rivals: 247Sports: ESPN: (82)				
Overall recruit ranking:
Note: In many cases, Scout, Rivals, 247Sports, On3, and ESPN may conflict in their listings of height and weight.; In these cases, the average was taken. ESPN grades are on a 100-point scale.; Sources: "2023 TCU Commits". Rivals.; "2023 Team Ranking". Rivals.

== Roster ==
2023–24 TCU Horned Frogs men's basketball team
Players
Coaches

Pos.	#	Name	Height	Weight	Year	Previous school	Hometown
G	0	Micah Peavy	6 ft 8 in (2.03 m)	215 lb (98 kg)	Sr	Texas Tech	Cibolo, Texas
F	1	Isaiah Manning	6 ft 8 in (2.03 m)	220 lb (100 kg)	Fr	Mansfield Legacy High School	Mansfield, Texas
F	2	Emanuel Miller	6 ft 7 in (2.01 m)	217 lb (98 kg)	GS	Texas A&M	Scarborough, Ontario
G	3	Avery Anderson III	6 ft 3 in (1.91 m)	170 lb (77 kg)	GS	Oklahoma State	Justin, Texas
G	4	Jameer Nelson Jr.	6 ft 2 in (1.88 m)	205 lb (93 kg)	RS Sr	Delaware	Haverford, Pennsylvania
F	5	Chuck O'Bannon Jr.	6 ft 7 in (2.01 m)	220 lb (100 kg)	RS Sr	USC	Las Vegas, Nevada
C	8	Ernest Udeh Jr.	6 ft 11 in (2.11 m)	260 lb (118 kg)	So	Kansas	Orlando, Florida
G	11	Trevian Tennyson	6 ft 4 in (1.93 m)	180 lb (82 kg)	GS	Texas A&M–Corpus Christi	Arlington, Texas
F	12	Xavier Cork	6 ft 9 in (2.06 m)	235 lb (107 kg)	Sr	Western Carolina	Sulphur Springs, Texas
F	21	JaKobe Coles	6 ft 8 in (2.03 m)	216 lb (98 kg)	Jr	Butler	Denton, Texas
G	22	Tyler Lundblade	6 ft 7 in (2.01 m)	212 lb (96 kg)	RS So	SMU	Dallas, Texas
G	30	Darius Ford (W)	5 ft 11 in (1.8 m)	155 lb (70 kg)	Jr	Paul Laurence Dunbar YMLA	Fort Worth, Texas
G	33	Trey Stuart (W)	6 ft 2 in (1.88 m)	175 lb (79 kg)	RS So	Brock High School	Weatherford, Texas
G	35	Cole Despie (W)	6 ft 3 in (1.91 m)	168 lb (76 kg)	RS So	Bellarmine College Prep	San Jose, California
F	41	Jace Posey	6 ft 5 in (1.96 m)	206 lb (93 kg)	Fr	Strake Jesuit College Prep	Houston, Texas
C	44	Essam Mostafa	6 ft 9 in (2.06 m)	250 lb (113 kg)	RS Sr	Coastal Carolina	Cairo, Egypt
G	55	Zach Gonsoulin (W)	6 ft 0 in (1.83 m)	157 lb (71 kg)	So	IMG Academy	Houston, Texas

Head coach

- Jamie Dixon (TCU)

Assistant coach(es)

- Tony Benford (Texas Tech)
- Duane Broussard (Bradley)
- Jamie McNeilly (LSU New Orleans)

Legend

- (C) Team captain
- (S) Suspended
- (I) Ineligible
- (W) Walk-on
- Injured
- Current redshirt

Roster

== Schedule and results ==
Date time, TV	Rank^{#}	Opponent^{#}	Result	Record	High points	High rebounds	High assists	Site (attendance) city, state
Exhibition
October 30, 2023*; 7:00 p.m., ESPN+		Texas Wesleyan	W 98–61	–	24 – Miller	4 – Tied	5 – Tied	Schollmaier Arena (N/A); Fort Worth, TX
Non-conference regular season
November 6, 2023*; 8:00 p.m., ESPN+		Southern	W 108–75	1–0	21 – Peavy	9 – Miller	6 – Nelson	Schollmaier Arena (5,729); Fort Worth, TX
November 9, 2023*; 7:00 p.m., ESPN+		Omaha	W 82–60	2–0	21 – Coles	11 – Udeh	5 – Anderson III	Schollmaier Arena (5,885); Fort Worth, TX
November 14, 2023*; 7:00 p.m., ESPN+		UT Rio Grande Valley	W 88–55	3–0	16 – Coles	9 – Mostafa	6 – Tennyson	Schollmaier Arena (5,438); Fort Worth, TX
November 17, 2023*; 7:00 p.m., ESPN+		Mississippi Valley State	W 86–52	4–0	13 – Tied	8 – Udeh	5 – Miller	Schollmaier Arena (5,574); Fort Worth, TX
November 21, 2023*; 7:00 p.m., ESPN+		Alcorn State	W 93–74	5–0	20 – Coles	6 – Miller	5 – Anderson III	Schollmaier Arena (5,328); Fort Worth, TX
November 27, 2023*; 7:00 p.m., ESPN+		Houston Christian	W 101–64	6–0	19 – Miller	6 – Coles	10 – Nelson Jr.	Schollmaier Arena (5,505); Fort Worth, TX
December 2, 2023*; 4:37 p.m., FS1		at Georgetown; Big East–Big 12 Battle	W 84–83	7–0	29 – Miller	7 – Anderson	4 – Tied	Capital One Arena (7,910); Washington, D.C.
December 9, 2023*; 3:00 p.m., FS1		vs. No. 24 Clemson; Basketball Hall of Fame Series Toronto	L 66–74	7–1	16 – Miller	10 – Udeh Jr.	2 – Tied	Coca-Cola Coliseum (5,281); Toronto, ON
December 16, 2023*; 8:00 p.m., ESPNU		vs. Arizona State; USLBM Coast-to-Coast Challenge	W 79–59	8–1	18 – Miller	12 – Peavy	10 – Peavy	Dickies Arena (4,890); Fort Worth, TX
December 21, 2023*; 4:30 p.m., ESPNU		vs. Old Dominion; Diamond Head Classic Quarterfinals	W 111–87	9–1	25 – O'Bannon	10 – Coles	6 – Nelson Jr.	Stan Sheriff Center (4,927); Honolulu, HI
December 22, 2023*; 4:00 p.m., ESPN2		vs. Nevada; Diamond Head Classic Semifinals	L 75–88	9–2	24 – Miller	8 – Miller	4 – Coles	Stan Sheriff Center (–); Honolulu, HI
December 24, 2023*; 5:30 p.m., ESPN2		at Hawai'i; Diamond Head Classic 3rd Place Game	W 65–51	10–2	13 – Nelson Jr.	8 – Cork	2 – Tied	Stan Sheriff Center (–); Honolulu, HI
January 1, 2024*; 3:00 p.m., ESPN+		Texas A&M–Commerce	W 77–42	11–2	13 – Tied	18 – Udeh Jr.	5 – Tied	Schollmaier Arena (6,194); Fort Worth, TX
Big 12 regular season
January 6, 2024; 1:00 p.m., CBS		at No. 2 Kansas	L 81–83	11–3 (0–1)	24 – Tennyson	5 – Tied	4 – Tied	Allen Fieldhouse (16,300); Lawrence, KS
January 10, 2024; 8:00 p.m., ESPN2		No. 9 Oklahoma	W 80–71	12–3 (1–1)	27 – Miller	9 – Miller	5 – Anderson III	Schollmaier Arena (6,864); Fort Worth, TX
January 13, 2024; 6:00 p.m., ESPN		No. 2 Houston	W 68–67	13–3 (2–1)	13 – Miller	9 – Udeh Jr.	6 – Anderson III	Schollmaier Arena (6,151); Fort Worth, TX
January 16, 2024; 6:00 p.m., ESPN+	No. 19	at Cincinnati	L 77–81 ^{OT}	13–4 (2–2)	17 – Tennyson	9 – Udeh Jr.	6 – Anderson III	Fifth Third Arena (10,314); Cincinnati, OH
January 20, 2024; 1:00 p.m., ESPNU	No. 19	No. 24 Iowa State	L 71–72	13–5 (2–3)	19 – Tennyson	9 – Peavy	4 – Miller	Schollmaier Arena (7,739); Fort Worth, TX
January 23, 2024; 8:00 p.m., ESPN2		at Oklahoma State	W 74–69	14–5 (3–3)	21 – Miller	11 – Miller	4 – Tied	Gallagher-Iba Arena (6,017); Stillwater, OK
January 27, 2024; 3:00 p.m., ESPN2		at No. 15 Baylor	W 105–102 ^{3OT}	15–5 (4–3)	30 – Nelson Jr.	7 – Udeh	5 – Anderson III	Foster Pavilion (7,500); Waco, TX
January 30, 2024; 6:00 p.m., ESPN2	No. 25	No. 15 Texas Tech	W 85–78	16–5 (5–3)	23 – Tennyson	7 – Udeh	4 – Peavy	Schollmaier Arena (6,903); Fort Worth, TX
February 3, 2024; 1:00 p.m., ESPN2	No. 25	Texas	L 66–77	16–6 (5–4)	15 – Miller	5 – Miller	4 – Tied	Schollmaier Arena (7,894); Fort Worth, TX
February 10, 2024; 1:00 p.m., ESPN2		at No. 14 Iowa State	L 59–71	16–7 (5–5)	18 – Miller	6 – Miller	4 – Anderson III	Hilton Coliseum (14,267); Ames, IA
February 12, 2024; 7:00 p.m., ESPN+		West Virginia	W 81–65	17–7 (6–5)	14 – Tied	7 – Peavy	5 – Tied	Schollmaier Arena (5,694); Fort Worth, TX
February 17, 2024; 11:00 a.m., ESPNU		at Kansas State	W 75–72	18–7 (7–5)	26 – Peavy	9 – Peavy	7 – Nelson Jr.	Bramlage Coliseum (9,609); Manhattan, KS
February 20, 2024; 8:00 p.m., ESPN2		at No. 23 Texas Tech	L 81–82	18–8 (7–6)	15 – Tied	12 – Miller	4 – Anderson III	United Supermarkets Arena (15,098); Lubbock, TX
February 24, 2024; 2:00 p.m., ESPN+		Cincinnati	W 75–57	19–8 (8–6)	18 – Tied	6 – Tied	6 – Miller	Schollmaier Arena (6,090); Fort Worth, TX
February 26, 2024; 8:00 p.m., ESPN		No. 15 Baylor	L 54–62	19–9 (8–7)	11 – Nelson Jr.	5 – Miller	4 – Nelson Jr.	Schollmaier Arena (6,810); Fort Worth, TX
March 2, 2024; 8:00 p.m., ESPN+		at BYU	L 75–87	19–10 (8–8)	15 – Miller	9 – Miller	5 – Nelson Jr.	Marriott Center (17,978); Provo, UT
March 6, 2024; 6:00 p.m., ESPN+		at West Virginia	W 93–81	20–10 (9–8)	21 – Miller	5 – Tied	6 – Nelson Jr.	WVU Coliseum (9,674); Morgantown, WV
March 9, 2024; 4:00 p.m., ESPN+		UCF	L 77–79	20–11 (9–9)	15 – Nelson Jr.	9 – Udeh Jr.	4 – Tied	Schollmaier Arena (7,033); Fort Worth, TX
Big 12 tournament
March 13, 2024; 2:00 p.m., ESPN+	(8)	vs. (9) Oklahoma; Second Round	W 77−70	21–11	26 – Miller	8 – Miller	5 – Nelson	T-Mobile Center (16,044); Kansas City, MO
March 14, 2024; 2:00 p.m., ESPN	(8)	vs. (1) No. 1 Houston; Quarterfinals	L 45–60	21–12	13 – Peavy	11 – Peavy	2 – Coles	T-Mobile Center (17,186); Kansas City, MO
NCAA tournament
March 22, 2024; 8:55 p.m., TBS	(9 MW)	vs. (8 MW) No. 20 Utah State; First Round	L 72–88	21–13	19 – Coles	11 – Miller	4 – Nelson Jr.	Gainbridge Fieldhouse (16,668); Indianapolis, IN
*Non-conference game. ^{#}Rankings from AP poll. (#) Tournament seedings in parentheses. MW=Midwest region. All times are in Central Time.

== Rankings ==
Ranking movements Legend: ██ Increase in ranking ██ Decrease in ranking — = Not ranked RV = Received votes
	Week																				
Poll	Pre	1	2	3	4	5	6	7	8	9	10	11	12	13	14	15	16	17	18	19	Final
AP	RV	RV	RV	RV	RV	RV	RV	—	—	RV	19	RV	25	RV	RV	RV	RV	—	—	—	—
Coaches	RV	RV	RV	RV	RV	RV	RV	RV	RV	RV	22	RV	25	RV	RV	25	RV	RV	—	—	—
