= Ernest Udeh Jr. =

American basketball player (born 2004)

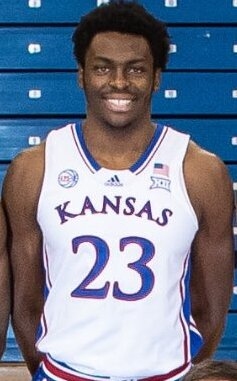
- Udeh in 2022

No. 88 – Cleveland Cavaliers
- Position: Center
- League: NBA

Personal information
- Born: January 8, 2004 (age 22) Orlando, Florida, U.S.
- Listed height: 6 ft 9 in (2.06 m)
- Listed weight: 266 lb (121 kg)

Career information
- High school: Dr. Phillips (Orlando, Florida)
- College: Kansas (2022–2023); TCU (2023–2025); Miami (Florida) (2025–2026)
- NBA draft: 2026: undrafted
- Playing career: 2026–present

Career history
- 2026–present: Cleveland Cavaliers
- 2026–present: →Cleveland Charge

Career highlights
- ACC All-Defensive team (2026); McDonald's All-American (2022)
- Stats at NBA.com
- Stats at Basketball Reference

Ernest Maduabuchi Udeh Jr. (born January 8, 2004) is an American basketball player for the Cleveland Cavaliers of the National Basketball Association (NBA), on a two-way contract with the Cleveland Charge of the NBA G League. He played college basketball for the Kansas Jayhawks, TCU Horned Frogs and Miami Hurricanes.

== Early life and high school career ==
Udeh grew up in Orlando, Florida and attended Dr. Phillips High School. He averaged 10.1 points, 9.8 rebounds, and 1.9 blocks per game as a junior as Dr. Phillips won the Class 7A state championship. Udeh averaged 13.1 points and 9.2 rebounds per game during his senior season. He played in the 2022 McDonald's All-American Boys Game.

=== Recruiting ===
Udeh was considered a five-star recruit by ESPN and a four-star recruit by 247Sports and Rivals. On October 20, 2021, he committed to playing college basketball for Kansas over offers from UCLA, Alabama, Arkansas, and Baylor.

College recruiting
Name	Hometown	School	Height	Weight	Commit date
Ernest Udeh Jr. C	Orlando, FL	Dr. Phillips (FL)	6 ft 10 in (2.08 m)	230 lb (100 kg)	Oct 20, 2021
Ernest Udeh Jr. C	Recruit ratings: Rivals: 247Sports: ESPN: (90)				
Overall recruit ranking: Rivals: 35 247Sports: 32 ESPN: 24
Note: In many cases, Scout, Rivals, 247Sports, On3, and ESPN may conflict in their listings of height and weight.; In these cases, the average was taken. ESPN grades are on a 100-point scale.; Sources: "Kansas 2022 Basketball Commitments". Rivals.; "2022 Kansas Jayhawks Recruiting Class". ESPN.; "2022 Team Ranking". Rivals.

== College career ==
Udeh enrolled at Kansas shortly after graduating high school and took part in the Jayhawks' summer practices. He made his college debut in Kansas's season opener against Omaha and scored five points with five rebounds and one block in over 14 minutes.

On May 31, 2023, Udeh committed to TCU. As a junior, he averaged 6.6 points, 7.5 rebounds, and 1.2 assists per game. Following the season he transferred to Miami. Udeh averaged 6.7 points, 9.2 rebounds, 1.0 steals and 1.4 blocks per game and was named to the All-ACC Defensive Team.

== Professional career ==
After going undrafted in the 2026 NBA draft, Udeh signed a two-way contract with the Cleveland Cavaliers on July 1, 2026.

== Career statistics ==
Legend
GP	Games played	GS	Games started	MPG	Minutes per game
FG%	Field goal percentage	3P%	3-point field goal percentage	FT%	Free throw percentage
RPG	Rebounds per game	APG	Assists per game	SPG	Steals per game
BPG	Blocks per game	PPG	Points per game	**Bold**	Career high

=== College ===
Year	Team	GP	GS	MPG	FG%	3P%	FT%	RPG	APG	SPG	BPG	PPG
2022–23	Kansas	30	0	8.3	**.756**	–	.409	1.8	0.3	0.7	0.6	2.6
2023–24	TCU	29	29	17.2	.609	–	.560	5.3	0.3	1.0	0.8	4.3
2024–25	TCU	30	30	26.6	.634	–	**.598**	7.5	**1.2**	**1.4**	1.3	6.6
2025–26	Miami	**33**	**33**	**28.2**	.727	–	.512	**9.2**	0.5	1.0	**1.4**	**6.7**
**Career**		**122**	**92**	**20.3**	**.678**	–	**.546**	**6.0**	**0.6**	**1.0**	**1.0**	**5.1**
