= 2022–23 TCU Horned Frogs men's basketball team =

American college basketball season

2022–23 TCU Horned Frogs men's basketball

Emerald Coast Classic champions

NCAA tournament, Second Round
- Conference: Big 12 Conference

Ranking
- AP: No. 22
- Record: 22–13 (9–9 Big 12)
- Head coach: Jamie Dixon (7th season)
- Associate head coach: Tony Benford
- Assistant coaches: Duane Broussard; Jamie McNeilly
- Home arena: Schollmaier Arena

2022–23 Big 12 men's basketball standings
	Conf.				Overall
Team	W		L	PCT	W		L	PCT
No. 4 Kansas	13	–	5	.722	28	–	8	.778
No. 5 Texas †	12	–	6	.667	29	–	9	.763
No. 15 Kansas State	11	–	7	.611	26	–	10	.722
No. 11 Baylor	11	–	7	.611	23	–	11	.676
Iowa State	9	–	9	.500	19	–	14	.576
No. 22 TCU	9	–	9	.500	22	–	13	.629
Oklahoma State	8	–	10	.444	20	–	16	.556
West Virginia	7	–	11	.389	19	–	15	.559
Texas Tech	5	–	13	.278	16	–	16	.500
Oklahoma	5	–	13	.278	15	–	17	.469
† 2023 Big 12 tournament winner Rankings from AP poll

The 2022–23 TCU Horned Frogs men's basketball team represented Texas Christian University during the 2022–23 NCAA Division I men's basketball season. The team was led by seventh-year head coach Jamie Dixon, and played their home games at Schollmaier Arena in Fort Worth, Texas as a member of the Big 12 Conference. They finished the season 22–13, 9–9 in Big 12 Play to finish in a tie for 5th place. They defeated Kansas State in the quarterfinals of the Big 12 Tournament before losing to Texas in the semifinals. They received an at-large bid to the NCAA Tournament, where they defeated Arizona State in the first round before losing in the second round to Gonzaga.

== Previous season ==
The Horned Frogs finished the 2021–22 season 21–13, 8–10 in Big 12 play to finish in fifth place. As the No. 5 seed in the Big 12 tournament, they defeated Texas in the quarterfinals, before losing to Kansas in the semifinals. They received an at-large bid to the NCAA tournament as the No. 9 seed in the South Region, where they defeated Seton Hall in the first round before losing to Arizona in the second round in an overtime thriller.

There was a small controversy regarding the final play in regular time during the game versus Arizona. Mike Miles Jr. looked like he had been fouled, but the foul was not called. However, Miles could have attempted the free throw shots, since there was a bonus. These shots would have sealed the game for a victory against Arizona.

With their win over Seton Hall in the first round, the Horned Frogs won their first NCAA tournament game since 1987.

== Offseason ==
=== Departures ===
Name	Number	Pos.	Height	Weight	Year	Hometown	Reason for departure
Francisco Farabello	3	G	6'3"	178	Junior	Cañada de Gómez, Argentina	Transferred to Creighton
Brandon Childress	14	G	6'4"	178	Freshman	Little Rock, AR	Walk-on; not on team roster
Harrison Young	30	G	5'11"	170	Senior	Auckland, New Zealand	Left the team for personal reasons
Maxwell Evans	33	G	6'2"	200	GS senior	Houston, TX	Graduated

=== Incoming transfers ===
Name	Number	Pos.	Height	Weight	Year	Hometown	Previous school
Rondel Walker	11	G	6'4"	170	Junior	Midwest City, OK	Oklahoma State
Tyler Lundblade	22	G	6'5"	185	Sophomore	Dallas, TX	SMU

=== Recruiting classes ===
==== 2022 recruiting class ====
College recruiting
Name	Hometown	School	Height	Weight	Commit date
PJ Haggerty #27 SG	Missouri City, TX	Crosby High School	6 ft 3 in (1.91 m)	170 lb (77 kg)	Jun 14, 2021
PJ Haggerty #27 SG	Recruit ratings: Scout: Rivals: 247Sports: ESPN: (81)				
Overall recruit ranking:
Note: In many cases, Scout, Rivals, 247Sports, On3, and ESPN may conflict in their listings of height and weight.; In these cases, the average was taken. ESPN grades are on a 100-point scale.; Sources: "2022 TCU Commits". Rivals.; "2022 Team Ranking". Rivals.

==== 2023 recruiting class ====
College recruiting (2023)
Name	Hometown	School	Height	Weight	Commit date
Isaiah Manning #29 PF	Mansfield, TX	Mansfield Legacy High School	6 ft 7 in (2.01 m)	200 lb (91 kg)	Jul 11, 2022
Isaiah Manning #29 PF	Recruit ratings: Scout: Rivals: 247Sports: ESPN: (79)				
Overall recruit ranking:
Note: In many cases, Scout, Rivals, 247Sports, On3, and ESPN may conflict in their listings of height and weight.; In these cases, the average was taken. ESPN grades are on a 100-point scale.; Sources: "2023 TCU Commits". Rivals.; "2023 Team Ranking". Rivals.

== Roster ==
2022–23 TCU Horned Frogs men's basketball team
Players
Coaches

Pos.	#	Name	Height	Weight	Year	Previous school	Hometown
G	0	Micah Peavy	6 ft 7 in (2.01 m)	215 lb (98 kg)	Jr	Texas Tech	Cibolo, Texas
G	1	Mike Miles Jr.	6 ft 2 in (1.88 m)	195 lb (88 kg)	Jr	Lancaster High School	Highland Hills, Texas
F	2	Emanuel Miller	6 ft 7 in (2.01 m)	215 lb (98 kg)	Sr	Texas A&M	Scarborough, Ontario
G	3	PJ Haggerty	6 ft 3 in (1.91 m)	183 lb (83 kg)	Fr	Crosby	Crosby, Texas
C	4	Eddie Lampkin Jr.	6 ft 11 in (2.11 m)	268 lb (122 kg)	So	Morton Ranch High School	Houston, Texas
F	5	Chuck O'Bannon Jr.	6 ft 6 in (1.98 m)	215 lb (98 kg)	RS Sr	USC	Las Vegas, Nevada
G	10	Damion Baugh	6 ft 4 in (1.93 m)	195 lb (88 kg)	Sr	Memphis	Nashville, Tennessee
G	11	Rondel Walker	6 ft 5 in (1.96 m)	185 lb (84 kg)	Jr	Putnam City West HS	Midwest City, OK
F	12	Xavier Cork	6 ft 9 in (2.06 m)	228 lb (103 kg)	Jr	Western Carolina	Sulphur Springs, Texas
G	13	Shahada Wells	6 ft 0 in (1.83 m)	180 lb (82 kg)	Sr	UT Arlington	Amarillo, Texas
F	21	JaKobe Coles	6 ft 7 in (2.01 m)	225 lb (102 kg)	So	Butler	Denton, Texas
G	22	Tyler Lundblade	6 ft 5 in (1.96 m)	207 lb (94 kg)	RS Fr	SMU	Dallas, Texas
C	25	Souleymane Doumbia	6 ft 11 in (2.11 m)	235 lb (107 kg)	Jr	Navarro College	Abidjan, Ivory Coast
G	30	Darius Ford (W)	5 ft 10 in (1.78 m)	142 lb (64 kg)	So	Paul Laurence Dunbar YMLA	Fort Worth, Texas
G	35	Cole Despie (W)	6 ft 3 in (1.91 m)	180 lb (82 kg)	So	Bellarmine College Prep	San Jose, California

Head coach

- Jamie Dixon (TCU)

Assistant coach(es)

- Tony Benford (Texas Tech)
- Duane Broussard (Bradley)
- Jamie McNeilly (LSU New Orleans)

Legend

- (C) Team captain
- (S) Suspended
- (I) Ineligible
- (W) Walk-on
- Injured
- Current redshirt

Roster

== Schedule and results ==
Date time, TV	Rank^{#}	Opponent^{#}	Result	Record	High points	High rebounds	High assists	Site (attendance) city, state
Exhibition
October 30, 2022*; 4:00 p.m.	No. 14	Paul Quinn	W 112–42		20 – Wells	8 – Tied	7 – Baugh	Schollmaier Arena (1,487); Fort Worth, TX
Regular season
November 7, 2022*; 7:00 p.m., ESPN+	No. 14	Arkansas–Pine Bluff	W 73–72	1–0	19 – Miller	7 – O'Bannon Jr.	5 – Wells	Schollmaier Arena (5,483); Fort Worth, TX
November 11, 2022*; 7:00 p.m., ESPN+	No. 14	Lamar	W 77–66	2–0	26 – Miles Jr.	9 – Lampkin Jr.	6 – Tied	Schollmaier Arena (5,320); Fort Worth, TX
November 14, 2022*; 7:00 p.m., ESPN+	No. 15	Northwestern State	L 63–64	2–1	12 – O'Bannon Jr.	11 – Lampkin Jr.	5 – Wells	Schollmaier Arena (5,038); Fort Worth, TX
November 17, 2022*; 7:00 p.m., ESPN+	No. 15	Louisiana–Monroe; Emerald Coast Classic Campus site game	W 95–60	3–1	16 – Miller	7 – Tied	7 – Wells	Schollmaier Arena (4,959); Fort Worth, TX
November 25, 2022*; 8:30 p.m., CBSSN		vs. California; Emerald Coast Classic semifinal	W 59–48	4–1	23 – Miles Jr.	9 – Peavy	2 – Tied	The Arena at NFSC (1,700); Niceville, FL
November 26, 2022*; 6:00 p.m., CBSSN		vs. No. 25 Iowa; Emerald Coast Classic Championship	W 79–66	5–1	16 – Peavy	8 – Peavy	5 – Miles Jr.	The Arena at NFSC (1,624); Niceville, FL
November 30, 2022*; 7:00 p.m., ESPN+		Providence; Big East–Big 12 Battle	W 75–62	6–1	16 – Lampkin	12 – Lampkin	5 – Baugh	Schollmaier Arena (5,593); Fort Worth, TX
December 6, 2022*; 7:00 p.m., ESPN+	No. 24	Jackson State	W 78–51	7–1	21 – Coles	7 – Tied	5 – Baugh	Schollmaier Arena (5,097); Fort Worth, TX
December 10, 2022*; 9:00 p.m., ESPN2	No. 24	vs. SMU	W 83–75	8–1	18 – Miles Jr.	8 – Lampkin Jr.	6 – Baugh	Dickies Arena (5,439); Fort Worth, TX
December 18, 2022*; 5:00 p.m., ESPN+	No. 21	Mississippi Valley State	W 88–43	9–1	15 – Miles Jr.	7 – Miller	5 – Miller	Schollmaier Arena (5,201); Fort Worth, TX
December 21, 2022*; 8:00 p.m., P12N	No. 20	vs. Utah	W 75–71	10–1	21 – Miller	10 – Lampkin	4 – Miles Jr.	Vivint Arena (7,202); Salt Lake City, UT
December 28, 2022*; 4:00 p.m., ESPN+	No. 18	Central Arkansas	W 103–57	11–1	21 – Miles Jr.	10 – Miller	6 – Baugh	Schollmaier Arena (5,387); Fort Worth, TX
December 31, 2022; 11:00 a.m., ESPNU	No. 18	Texas Tech	W 67–61	12–1 (1–0)	23 – Miles Jr.	8 – Lampkin	5 – Baugh	Schollmaier Arena (5,899); Fort Worth, TX
January 4, 2023; 8:00 p.m., ESPN2	No. 17	at No. 19 Baylor	W 88–87	13–1 (2–0)	33 – Miles Jr.	9 – Lampkin Jr.	7 – Baugh	Ferrell Center (8,710); Waco, TX
January 7, 2023; 1:00 p.m., ESPNU	No. 17	No. 25 Iowa State	L 67–69	13–2 (2–1)	18 – Miles Jr.	7 – Baugh	5 – Baugh	Schollmaier Arena (6,333); Fort Worth, TX
January 11, 2023; 8:00 p.m., ESPN2	No. 17	at No. 10 Texas	L 75–79	13–3 (2–2)	21 – Miller	9 – Lampkin Jr.	10 – Baugh	Moody Center (11,313); Austin, TX
January 14, 2023; 1:00 p.m., ESPN2	No. 17	No. 11 Kansas State	W 82–68	14–3 (3–2)	23 – Miller	8 – Miller	11 – Miles Jr.	Schollmaier Arena (5,884); Fort Worth, TX
January 18, 2023; 6:00 p.m., ESPN+	No. 14	at West Virginia	L 65–74	14–4 (3–3)	21 – Miles Jr.	5 – Miller	4 – Baugh	WVU Coliseum (11,402); Morgantown, WV
January 21, 2023; 12:00 p.m., CBS	No. 14	at No. 2 Kansas	W 83–60	15–4 (4–3)	17 – Wells	8 – Miller	4 – Tied	Allen Fieldhouse (16,300); Lawrence, KS
January 24, 2023; 7:00 p.m., ESPN+	No. 11	Oklahoma	W 79–52	16–4 (5–3)	23 – Miles Jr.	10 – Miller	5 – Baugh	Schollmaier Arena (8,145); Fort Worth, TX
January 28, 2023*; 3:00 p.m., ESPN2	No. 11	at Mississippi State; Big 12/SEC Challenge	L 74–81 ^{OT}	16–5	19 – Baugh	8 – Coles	4 – Baugh	Humphrey Coliseum (8,643); Starkville, MS
January 31, 2023; 8:00 p.m., ESPNU	No. 15	West Virginia	W 76–72	17–5 (6–3)	17 – Coles	7 – Miller	10 – Baugh	Schollmaier Arena (7,444); Fort Worth, TX
February 4, 2023; 1:00 p.m., ESPN+	No. 15	at Oklahoma State	L 73–79	17–6 (6–4)	17 – Miller	6 – Baugh	5 – Baugh	Gallagher-Iba Arena (9,581); Stillwater, OK
February 7, 2023; 8:00 p.m., ESPNU	No. 17	at No. 12 Kansas State	L 61–82	17–7 (6–5)	18 – Nowell	9 – Greene	7 – Nowell	Bramlage Coliseum (8,667); Manhattan, KS
February 11, 2023; 3:00 p.m., ESPN2	No. 17	No. 14 Baylor	L 68–72	17–8 (6–6)	16 – Baugh	7 – Baugh	10 – Baugh	Schollmaier Arena (7,055); Fort Forth, TX
February 15, 2023; 8:00 p.m., ESPNU	No. 22	at No. 19 Iowa State	L 59–70	17–9 (6–7)	15 – Wells	7 – Wells	9 – Baugh	Hilton Coliseum (13,557); Ames, IA
February 18, 2023; 1:00 p.m., ESPN+	No. 22	Oklahoma State	W 100–75	18–9 (7–7)	18 – Miller	5 – Miller	11 – Baugh	Schollmaier Arena (6,404); Fort Worth, TX
February 20, 2023; 8:00 p.m., ESPN	No. 24	No. 3 Kansas	L 58–63	18–10 (7–8)	13 – Miles Jr.	8 – Lampkin Jr.	4 – Baugh	Schollmaier Arena (7,831); Fort Worth, TX
February 25, 2023; 11:00 a.m., ESPN2	No. 24	at Texas Tech	W 83–82	19–10 (8–8)	24 – Miles Jr.	12 – Miller	9 – Baugh	United Supermarkets Arena (14,410); Lubbock, TX
March 1, 2023; 8:00 p.m., ESPN2	No. 22	No. 9 Texas	W 75–73	20–10 (9–8)	24 – Baugh	10 – Miller	9 – Baugh	Schollmaier Arena (8,194); Fort Worth, TX
March 4, 2023; 2:00 p.m., ESPN+	No. 22	at Oklahoma	L 60–74	20–11 (9–9)	17 – Miles Jr.	8 – Baugh	3 – Baugh	Lloyd Noble Center (7,711); Norman, OK
Big 12 tournament
March 9, 2023; 8:30 p.m., ESPN2	(6) No. 22	vs. (3) No. 12 Kansas State; Quarterfinals	W 80–67	21–11	22 – Tied	7 – Tied	4 – Tied	T-Mobile Center (17,476); Kansas City, MO
March 10, 2023; 8:30 p.m., ESPN	(6) No. 22	vs. (2) No. 7 Texas; Semifinals	L 60–66	21–12	15 – Miles Jr.	10 – Baugh	4 – Baugh	T-Mobile Center; Kansas City, MO
NCAA Tournament
March 17, 2023*; 9:05 pm, TruTV	(6 W) No. 22	vs. (11 W) Arizona State; First Round	W 72–70	22–12	26 – Miles Jr.	7 – Miller	8 – Baugh	Ball Arena (19,152); Denver, CO
March 19, 2023*; 8:40 pm, TBS	(6 W) No. 22	vs. (3 W) No. 9 Gonzaga; Second Round	L 81–84	22–13	24 – Miles Jr.	8 – Baugh	4 – Tied	Ball Arena (19,229); Denver, CO
*Non-conference game. ^{#}Rankings from AP Poll. (#) Tournament seedings in parentheses. All times are in Central Time.

== Rankings ==
Ranking movements Legend: ██ Increase in ranking ██ Decrease in ranking RV = Received votes
	Week																			
Poll	Pre	1	2	3	4	5	6	7	8	9	10	11	12	13	14	15	16	17	18	Final
AP	14	15	RV	RV	24	21	20	18	17	17	14	11	15	17	22	24	22	22	22	Not released
Coaches	16	18*	RV	RV	25	22	19	19	17	17	13	11	16	19	24	RV	22	23	23	RV

*No poll released
