= Chuck O'Bannon Jr. =

American basketball player (born 1999)

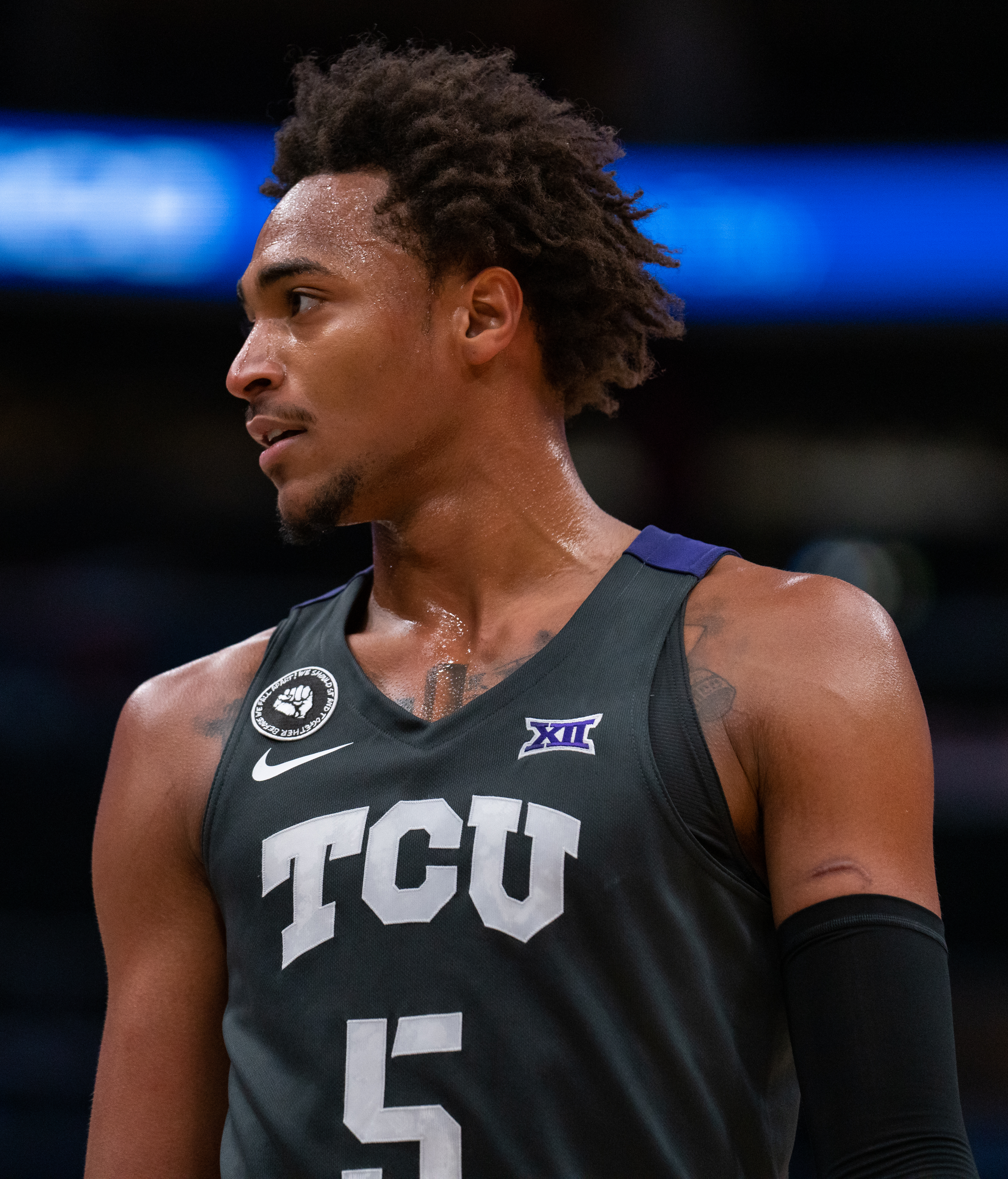
- O'Bannon with TCU in 2021

Free agent
- Position: Shooting guard / small forward

Personal information
- Born: March 1, 1999 (age 27) Long Beach, California, U.S.
- Listed height: 6 ft 6 in (1.98 m)
- Listed weight: 215 lb (98 kg)

Career information
- High school: Bishop Gorman (Las Vegas, Nevada)
- College: USC (2017–2019); TCU (2020–2024)
- NBA draft: 2024: undrafted
- Playing career: 2024–present

Career history
- 2024–2025: Nitra Blue Wings
- 2025–2026: Budapesti Honvéd SE

Career highlights
- McDonald's All-American (2017)

Charles Edward O'Bannon Jr. (born March 1, 1999) is an American professional basketball player who most recently played for Budapesti Honvéd SE of the Nemzeti Bajnokság I/A. He played college basketball for the TCU Horned Frogs and the USC Trojans.

== Early life ==
O'Bannon was born to Valencia and Charles O'Bannon, who was playing professional basketball. O'Bannon lived in Japan from ages 2 to 14 with his parents while his father was playing there.

O'Bannon attended Bishop Gorman High School in Las Vegas, Nevada. He averaged 21.4 points as a senior at Bishop Gorman. In December 2016, he committed to the USC Trojans. He chose USC over UNLV, NC State, and UCLA. He was named a McDonald's All-American.

== College career ==
O'Bannon was the first McDonald's All-American to join USC since DeMar DeRozan in 2008. He struggled with injuries during his two and a half seasons with the Trojans. After suffering an injury to his left pinky finger that required surgery, he redshirted the 2018-19 season. O'Bannon injured his middle finger early in the following season and played three games. He played a total of 18 games at USC and averaged 1.8 points and 0.8 rebounds per game. In January 2020, O'Bannon transferred to TCU and was later granted a waiver for immediate eligibility.

In 2021–22, TCU was a No. 9 seed in the 2022 NCAA tournament, and earned their first NCAA Tournament win in 35 years. O'Bannon scored a career-high 23 points in a second-round loss to Arizona, ending the Horned Frogs bid to reach the Sweet 16 for the first time.

== Professional career ==
After going undrafted in the 2024 NBA draft, O'Bannon signed a contract with the Nitra Blue Wings. In 2025, he joined Budapesti Honvéd SE of the Nemzeti Bajnokság I/A. In 24 games in Hungary, he averaged 9.3 points, 4.6 rebounds and 1.0 block per game before leaving the team in April 2026.

== Career statistics ==
Legend
GP	Games played	GS	Games started	MPG	Minutes per game
FG%	Field goal percentage	3P%	3-point field goal percentage	FT%	Free throw percentage
RPG	Rebounds per game	APG	Assists per game	SPG	Steals per game
BPG	Blocks per game	PPG	Points per game	**Bold**	Career high

=== College ===
Year	Team	GP	GS	MPG	FG%	3P%	FT%	RPG	APG	SPG	BPG	PPG
2017–18	USC	14	0	5.1	.217	.125	**1.000**	.6	.1	.3	.0	1.3
2018–19	USC	1	0	10.0	.000	.000	.000	1.0	.0	.0	.0	.0
2019–20	USC	3	0	6.3	.000	.000	**1.000**	1.3	.3	.7	.0	.7
2020–21	TCU	25	15	18.0	.407	**.368**	.756	3.8	.5	.8	.5	6.8
2021–22	TCU	34	25	**24.0**	.408	.338	.703	**4.2**	.9	**.9**	.6	**9.5**
2022–23	TCU	**35**	**31**	21.9	.381	.311	.750	3.4	**1.0**	.8	**1.0**	7.7
2023–24	TCU	31	3	14.6	**.420**	.365	.776	2.6	.8	.4	.5	5.5
Career		143	74	18.1	.393	.335	.748	3.1	.8	.7	.6	6.7

== Personal life ==
O'Bannon's father, Charles, and uncle, Ed O'Bannon, were teammates on UCLA's 1994–95 national title team.
