= 2022–23 Kansas Jayhawks men's basketball team =

American college basketball season

2022–23 Kansas Jayhawks men's basketball
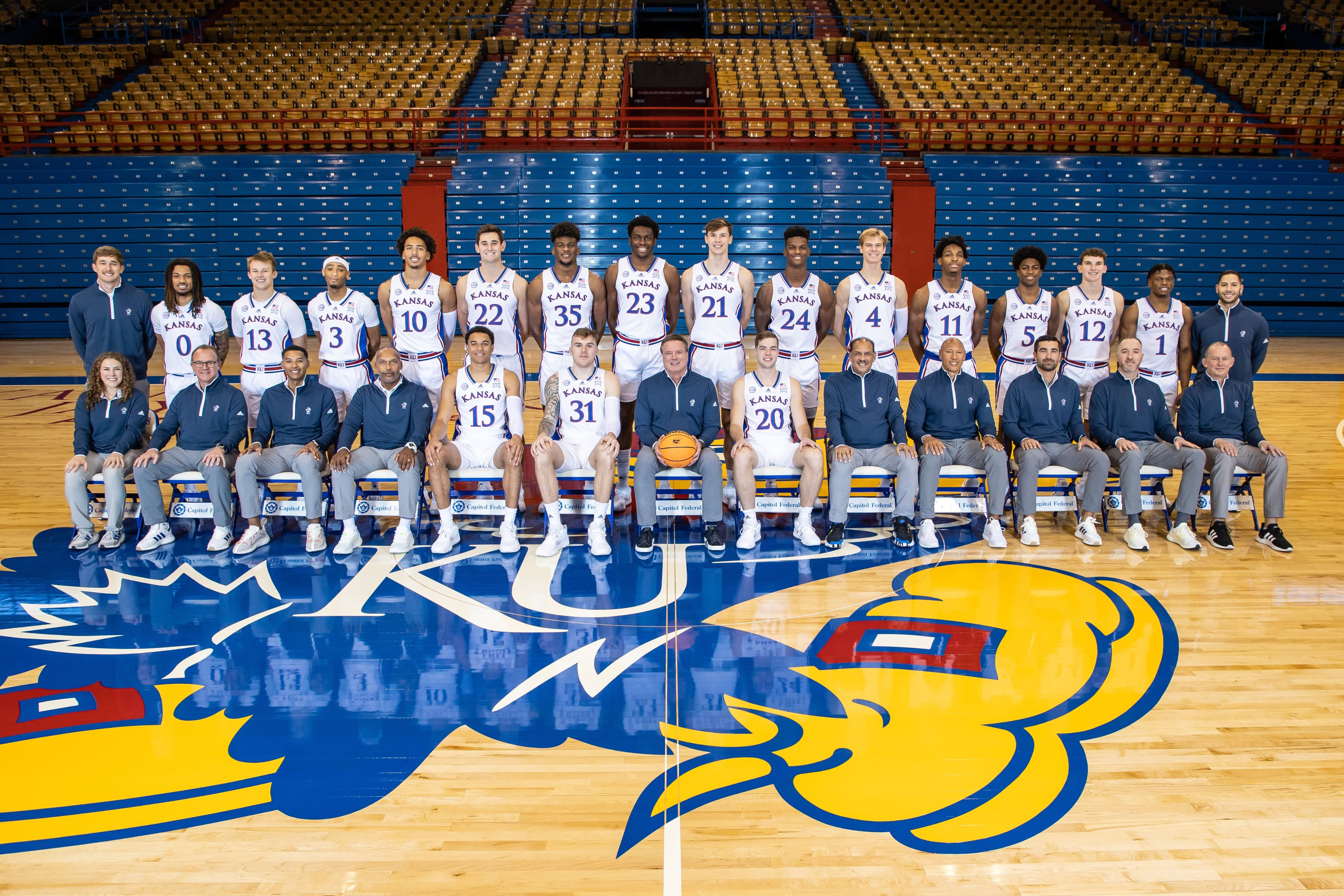

Big 12 regular season champions

NCAA tournament, Second Round
- Conference: Big 12 Conference

Ranking
- Coaches: No. 11
- AP: No. 4
- Record: 28–8 (13–5 Big 12)
- Head coach: Bill Self (20th season; suspended first 4 games, illness for Big 12 Tournament and NCAA Tournament); Norm Roberts (acting, 4–0)
- Assistant coaches: Jeremy Case (2nd season); Norm Roberts (12th season); Kurtis Townsend (19th season)
- Home arena: Allen Fieldhouse

2022–23 Big 12 men's basketball standings
	Conf.				Overall
Team	W		L	PCT	W		L	PCT
No. 4 Kansas	13	–	5	.722	28	–	8	.778
No. 5 Texas †	12	–	6	.667	29	–	9	.763
No. 15 Kansas State	11	–	7	.611	26	–	10	.722
No. 11 Baylor	11	–	7	.611	23	–	11	.676
Iowa State	9	–	9	.500	19	–	14	.576
No. 22 TCU	9	–	9	.500	22	–	13	.629
Oklahoma State	8	–	10	.444	20	–	16	.556
West Virginia	7	–	11	.389	19	–	15	.559
Texas Tech	5	–	13	.278	16	–	16	.500
Oklahoma	5	–	13	.278	15	–	17	.469
† 2023 Big 12 tournament winner Rankings from AP poll

The 2022–23 Kansas Jayhawks men's basketball team represented the University of Kansas in the 2022–23 NCAA Division I men's basketball season, which was the Jayhawks' 125th basketball season. The Jayhawks, members of the Big 12 Conference, played their home games at Allen Fieldhouse in Lawrence, Kansas. They were led by 20th year Hall of Fame head coach Bill Self. Kansas finished first in the Big 12 in the regular season. The Jayhawks qualified for the NCAA tournament but lost in the 2nd round.

== Season summary ==
On November 2, 2022, Kansas announced that Self and assistant coach Kurtis Townsend would serve a four-game suspension for alleged recruiting violations from a 2017 FBI probe. Assistant coach Norm Roberts served as acting head coach during the suspension. Roberts would serve as acting head again during the Big 12 and NCAA Tournaments while Self was out following a procedure on his heart.

In January, the Jayhawks lost to Kansas State, TCU, and Baylor for what is only their 4th 3 game losing streak under Self, and only the 11th losing streak of any length. Kansas finished the regular season 25–6, their 33rd consecutive 20+ win season and their 38th in the previous 39 seasons. After defeating Texas Tech on February 28, the Jayhawks clinched the Big 12 title, their 21st regular season Big 12 title and their 64th regular season conference title. All of the Jayhawks 6 regular season losses came to ranked teams and five of the six finished the season ranked in the AP and all six made the NCAA tournament. In turn, the Jayhawks were undefeated against unranked teams. They also went undefeated against quadrant 2, 3, and 4 teams with a combined 10–0 record in those quads. They also finished the season with 17 quadrant 1 wins, the most in the nation. Redshirt junior forward Jalen Wilson was named First Team All-American by the AP.

The Jayhawks qualified for the NCAA tournament with an at-large bid. It was the Jayhawks NCAA record extending 33rd consecutive and their 51st in program history. They won their first round game over Howard 96–68, extending their first round winning streak to 16 straight. They would lose in the second round to Arkansas 72–71 marking the third time in their last four tournament appearances they failed to make the Sweet 16.

== Offseason ==
=== Players graduated ===
Below are players who ran out of eligibility or seniors that did not declare intent for a 5th year as allowed by the NCAA due to the COVID-19 pandemic.

Name	Position
Ochai Agbaji	G
Jalen Coleman-Lands	G
Mitch Lightfoot	F
Remy Martin	G
David McCormack	C
Chris Teahan	G

=== Entered NBA draft ===
Players listed below are underclassmen who have entered the 2022 NBA draft. Class provided is class from previous season.

Name	Position	Class	Returned?
Christian Braun	G	Junior	No
Jalen Wilson	G	RS Junior	Yes

=== Incoming transfers ===
Name	Position	Class	Old school
Kevin McCullar Jr.	G	RS Senior	Texas Tech

=== Walk-ons ===
Name	Position	Class
Wilder Evers	Guard	Freshman

=== 2022 recruiting class ===
College recruiting information
Name	Hometown	School	Height	Weight	Commit date
Gradey Dick; F	Wichita, KS	Sunrise Christian Academy	6 ft 7 in (2.01 m)	195 lb (88 kg)	Mar 3, 2021
Gradey Dick; F	Recruit ratings: Rivals: 247Sports: ESPN: (92)				
M. J. Rice; F	Durham, NC	Prolific Prep	6 ft 5 in (1.96 m)	200 lb (91 kg)	Aug 10, 2021
M. J. Rice; F	Recruit ratings: Rivals: 247Sports: ESPN: (89)				
Ernest Udeh Jr. C	Orlando, FL	Dr. Phillips	6 ft 10 in (2.08 m)	232 lb (105 kg)	Oct 20, 2021
Ernest Udeh Jr. C	Recruit ratings: Rivals: 247Sports: ESPN: (90)				
Zuby Ejiofor; C	Garland, TX	Garland	6 ft 8 in (2.03 m)	220 lb (100 kg)	Jul 1, 2021
Zuby Ejiofor; C	Recruit ratings: Rivals: 247Sports: ESPN: (82)				
Overall recruiting rankings: 247 Sports: 4 Rivals: 3 ESPN: 5

== Roster ==
2022–23 Kansas Jayhawks men's basketball team
Players
Coaches

Pos.	#	Name	Height	Weight	Year	Hometown
G	0	Bobby Pettiford Jr.	6 ft 1 in (1.85 m)	190 lb (86 kg)	So	Durham, NC
G	1	Joseph Yesufu	6 ft 0 in (1.83 m)	180 lb (82 kg)	Jr	Bolingbrook, IL
G	3	Dajuan Harris Jr.	6 ft 1 in (1.85 m)	170 lb (77 kg)	RS Jr	Columbia, MO
G	4	Gradey Dick	6 ft 7 in (2.01 m)	195 lb (88 kg)	Fr	Wichita, KS
G	5	Kyle Cuffe Jr. (injured)	6 ft 2 in (1.88 m)	180 lb (82 kg)	RS Fr	New York, NY
F	10	Jalen Wilson	6 ft 8 in (2.03 m)	225 lb (102 kg)	RS Jr	Denton, TX
G	11	M. J. Rice	6 ft 5 in (1.96 m)	200 lb (91 kg)	Fr	Durham, NC
G	12	Wilder Evers (W)	6 ft 3 in (1.91 m)	190 lb (86 kg)	Fr	Birmingham, AL
G	13	Charlie McCarthy (W)	6 ft 2 in (1.88 m)	195 lb (88 kg)	So	Rancho Mirage, CA
G	15	Kevin McCullar Jr.	6 ft 6 in (1.98 m)	210 lb (95 kg)	RS Sr	San Antonio, TX
G	20	Michael Jankovich (W)	6 ft 5 in (1.96 m)	190 lb (86 kg)	Sr	Dallas, TX
F	21	Zach Clemence	6 ft 10 in (2.08 m)	225 lb (102 kg)	So	San Antonio, TX
F	22	Dillon Wilhite (W)	6 ft 9 in (2.06 m)	240 lb (109 kg)	RS Fr	San Diego, CA
C	23	Ernest Udeh Jr.	6 ft 11 in (2.11 m)	250 lb (113 kg)	Fr	Orlando, FL
F	24	KJ Adams Jr.	6 ft 7 in (2.01 m)	225 lb (102 kg)	So	Austin, TX
F	31	Cam Martin (injured)	6 ft 9 in (2.06 m)	230 lb (104 kg)	RS Sr	Yukon, OK
F	35	Zuby Ejiofor	6 ft 8 in (2.03 m)	220 lb (100 kg)	Fr	Garland, TX

Head coach

- Bill Self (Oklahoma State)

Assistant coach(es)

- Norm Roberts (Queens (NY))
- Kurtis Townsend (Western Kentucky)
- Jeremy Case (Kansas)

Legend

- (C) Team captain
- (S) Suspended
- (I) Ineligible
- (W) Walk-on
- Injured
- Current redshirt

Roster
Last update: February 21, 2023

== Schedule and results ==
Date time, TV	Rank^{#}	Opponent^{#}	Result	Record	High points	High rebounds	High assists	Site (attendance) city, state
Exhibition
November 3, 2022*; 7:00 pm, ESPN+	No. 5т	Pittsburg State	W 94–63	–	23 – Wilson	4 – Tied	4 – Harris Jr.	Allen Fieldhouse (16,300); Lawrence, KS
Regular Season
November 7, 2022*; 7:00 pm, ESPN+	No. 5т	Omaha	W 89–64	1–0	23 – Dick	11 – Wilson	7 – Wilson	Allen Fieldhouse (16,300); Lawrence, KS
November 10, 2022*; 7:00 pm, ESPN+	No. 5т	North Dakota State	W 82–59	2–0	21 – Wilson	9 – Wilson	8 – Pettiford Jr.	Allen Fieldhouse (16,300); Lawrence, KS
November 15, 2022*; 8:30 pm, ESPN	No. 6	vs. No. 7 Duke; Champions Classic	W 69–64	3–0	25 – Wilson	11 – Wilson	10 – Harris Jr.	Gainbridge Fieldhouse (15,828); Indianapolis, IN
November 18, 2022*; 7:00 pm, ESPN+	No. 6	Southern Utah	W 82–76	4–0	33 – Wilson	8 – McCullar Jr.	4 – Tied	Allen Fieldhouse (16,300); Lawrence, KS
November 23, 2022*; 11:00 am, ESPN	No. 3	vs. NC State; Battle 4 Atlantis; First round	W 80–74	5–0	25 – Dick	11 – Tied	6 – Harris Jr.	Imperial Arena (1,275); Paradise Island, The Bahamas
November 24, 2022*; 10:00 am, ESPN	No. 3	vs. Wisconsin; Battle 4 Atlantis; Semifinals	W 69–68 ^{OT}	6–0	29 – Wilson	14 – Wilson	7 – Harris Jr.	Imperial Arena (1,185); Paradise Island, The Bahamas
November 25, 2022*; 6:30 pm, ESPN	No. 3	vs. No. 22 Tennessee; Battle 4 Atlantis; Championship	L 50–64	6–1	14 – Wilson	7 – Adams Jr.	3 – Tied	Imperial Arena (2,018); Paradise Island, The Bahamas
November 28, 2022*; 7:00 pm, ESPN+	No. 9	Texas Southern	W 87–55	7–1	22 – Wilson	6 – Dick	6 – Wilson	Allen Fieldhouse (16,300); Lawrence, KS
December 1, 2022*; 8:00 pm, ESPN	No. 9	Seton Hall; Big East–Big 12 Battle	W 91–65	8–1	17 – McCullar Jr.	13 – Wilson	7 – Harris Jr.	Allen Fieldhouse (16,300); Lawrence, KS
December 10, 2022*; 4:15 pm, ESPN	No. 6	at Missouri; Border War	W 95–67	9–1	24 – Wilson	10 – Wilson	9 – Harris Jr.	Mizzou Arena (15,061); Columbia, MO
December 17, 2022*; 11:00 am, ESPN2	No. 8	No. 14 Indiana	W 84–62	10–1	20 – Dick	11 – McCullar Jr.	10 – Harris Jr.	Allen Fieldhouse (16,300); Lawrence, KS
December 22, 2022*; 8:00 pm, ESPN2	No. 4	Harvard	W 68–54	11–1	21 – Wilson	11 – McCullar Jr.	4 – Tied	Allen Fieldhouse (16,300); Lawrence, KS
December 31, 2022; 1:00 pm, CBS	No. 4	Oklahoma State	W 69–67	12–1 (1–0)	20 – Wilson	9 – Dick	9 – Harris Jr.	Allen Fieldhouse (16,300); Lawrence, KS
January 3, 2023; 8:00 pm, ESPN2	No. 3	at Texas Tech	W 75–72	13–1 (2–0)	17 – Harris Jr.	8 – Dick	3 – Tied	United Supermarkets Arena (14,385); Lubbock, TX
January 7, 2023; 5:00 pm, ESPN+	No. 3	at West Virginia	W 76–62	14–1 (3–0)	16 – Dick	14 – Wilson	4 – Harris Jr.	WVU Coliseum (14,135); Morgantown, WV
January 10, 2023; 8:00 pm, ESPN2	No. 2	Oklahoma	W 79–75	15–1 (4–0)	22 – Adams Jr.	8 – Wilson	5 – Harris Jr.	Allen Fieldhouse (16,300); Lawrence, KS
January 14, 2023; 3:00 pm, ESPN+	No. 2	No. 14 Iowa State	W 62–60	16–1 (5–0)	21 – Dick	11 – Wilson	6 – Harris Jr.	Allen Fieldhouse (16,300); Lawrence, KS
January 17, 2023; 6:00 pm, ESPN	No. 2	at No. 13 Kansas State; Sunflower Showdown	L 82–83 ^{OT}	16–2 (5–1)	38 – Wilson	9 – Wilson	11 – Harris Jr.	Bramlage Coliseum (11,000); Manhattan, KS
January 21, 2023; 12:00 pm, CBS	No. 2	No. 14 TCU	L 60–83	16–3 (5–2)	30 – Wilson	7 – Wilson	8 – Harris Jr.	Allen Fieldhouse (16,300); Lawrence, KS
January 23, 2023; 8:00 pm, ESPN	No. 9	at No. 17 Baylor	L 69–75	16–4 (5–3)	23 – Wilson	12 – McCullar Jr.	4 – Tied	Ferrell Center (10,219); Waco, TX
January 28, 2023*; 7:00 pm, ESPN	No. 9	at Kentucky; Big 12/SEC Challenge	W 77–68	17–4	22 – Wilson	12 – McCullar Jr.	8 – Harris Jr.	Rupp Arena (20,418); Lexington, KY
January 31, 2023; 7:00 pm, ESPN+	No. 8	No. 7 Kansas State; Sunflower Showdown	W 90–78	18–4 (6–3)	20 – Wilson	13 – McCullar Jr.	4 – Tied	Allen Fieldhouse (16,300); Lawrence, KS
February 4, 2023; 11:00 am, ESPN	No. 8	at No. 13 Iowa State	L 53–68	18–5 (6–4)	26 – Wilson	11 – McCullar Jr.	3 – Tied	Hilton Coliseum (14,267); Ames, IA
February 6, 2023; 8:00 pm, ESPN	No. 9	No. 5 Texas	W 88–80	19–5 (7–4)	21 – Dick	8 – Adams Jr.	6 – McCullar Jr.	Allen Fieldhouse (16,300); Lawrence, KS
February 11, 2023; 12:00 pm, CBS	No. 9	at Oklahoma	W 78–55	20–5 (8–4)	18 – Wilson	5 – Tied	5 – Wilson	Lloyd Noble Center (9,418); Norman, OK
February 14, 2023; 8:00 pm, ESPN	No. 5	at Oklahoma State	W 87–76	21–5 (9–4)	26 – Dick	5 – Harris Jr.	9 – Harris Jr.	Gallagher-Iba Arena (11,165); Stillwater, OK
February 18, 2023; 3:00 pm, ESPN	No. 5	No. 9 Baylor	W 87–71	22–5 (10–4)	21 – Wilson	13 – Wilson	9 – Harris Jr.	Allen Fieldhouse (16,300); Lawrence, KS
February 20, 2023; 8:00 pm, ESPN	No. 3	at No. 24 TCU	W 63–58	23–5 (11–4)	19 – Dick	13 – Wilson	8 – Harris Jr.	Schollmaier Arena (7,831); Fort Worth, TX
February 25, 2023; 3:00 pm, ESPN	No. 3	West Virginia	W 76–74	24–5 (12–4)	17 – Harris Jr.	6 – Tied	6 – Harris Jr.	Allen Fieldhouse (16,300); Lawrence, KS
February 28, 2023; 8:00 pm, ESPN	No. 3	Texas Tech	W 67–63	25–5 (13–4)	21 – Wilson	8 – Adams Jr.	5 – Harris Jr.	Allen Fieldhouse (16,300); Lawrence, KS
March 4, 2023; 3:00 pm, ESPN	No. 3	at No. 9 Texas	L 59–75	25–6 (13–5)	23 – Wilson	10 – Wilson	7 – Harris Jr.	Moody Center (11,313); Austin, TX
Big 12 Tournament
March 9, 2023; 2:00 p.m., ESPN	(1) No. 3	vs. (8) West Virginia; Quarterfinals	W 78–61	26–6	22 – Wilson	11 – Wilson	8 – Harris Jr.	T-Mobile Center (18,034); Kansas City, MO
March 10, 2023; 6:00 p.m., ESPN	(1) No. 3	vs. (5) Iowa State; Semifinals	W 71–58	27–6	25 – Wilson	10 – Wilson	6 – Harris Jr.	T-Mobile Center (19,135); Kansas City, MO
March 11, 2023; 5:00 p.m., ESPN	(1) No. 3	vs. (2) No. 7 Texas; Championship	L 56–76	27–7	24 – Wilson	8 – Dick	4 – Harris Jr.	T-Mobile Center (17,763); Kansas City, MO
NCAA Tournament
March 16, 2023*; 1:00 pm, TBS	(1 W) No. 4	vs. (16 W) Howard; First Round	W 96–68	28–7	20 – Wilson	11 – Dick	7 – Harris Jr.	Wells Fargo Arena (16,745); Des Moines, IA
March 18, 2023*; 4:15 pm, CBS	(1 W) No. 4	vs. (8 W) Arkansas; Second Round	L 71–72	28–8	20 – Wilson	7 – Dick	5 – Harris Jr.	Wells Fargo Arena (16,796); Des Moines, IA
*Non-conference game. ^{#}Rankings from AP Poll. (#) Tournament seedings in parentheses. All times are in Central Time.

== Rankings ==
Ranking movements Legend: ██ Increase in ranking ██ Decrease in ranking т = Tied with team above or below ( ) = First-place votes
	Week																			
Poll	Pre	1	2	3	4	5	6	7	8	9	10	11	12	13	14	15	16	17	18	Final
AP	5т	6	3 (1)	9	6	8	4	4	3	2 (22)	2 (23)	9	8	9	5	3 (7)	3 (8)	3	4	Not released
Coaches	5	5*	3	9	6	6	4 (1)	4	3	2 (12)	2 (9)	9	8	8	8	4 (1)	3 (3)	4 (2)	5	11

*No poll released
