= 2017–18 USC Trojans men's basketball team =

American college basketball season

2017–18 USC Trojans men's basketball

Diamond Head Classic champions

NIT, Second Round
- Conference: Pac-12 Conference
- Record: 24–12 (12–6 Pac-12)
- Head coach: Andy Enfield (5th season)
- Assistant coaches: Jason Hart; Chris Capko; Martin Bahar
- Home arena: Galen Center

2017–18 Pac-12 Conference men's basketball standings
	Conf.				Overall
Team	W		L	PCT	W		L	PCT
No. 12 Arizona †	14	–	4	.778	27	–	8	.771
USC	12	–	6	.667	24	–	12	.667
UCLA	11	–	7	.611	21	–	12	.636
Utah	11	–	7	.611	23	–	12	.657
Stanford	11	–	7	.611	19	–	16	.543
Oregon	10	–	8	.556	23	–	13	.639
Washington	10	–	8	.556	21	–	13	.618
Colorado	8	–	10	.444	17	–	15	.531
Arizona State	8	–	10	.444	20	–	12	.625
Oregon State	7	–	11	.389	16	–	16	.500
Washington State	4	–	14	.222	12	–	19	.387
California	2	–	16	.111	8	–	24	.250
† Pac-12 Tournament winner Rankings from AP poll

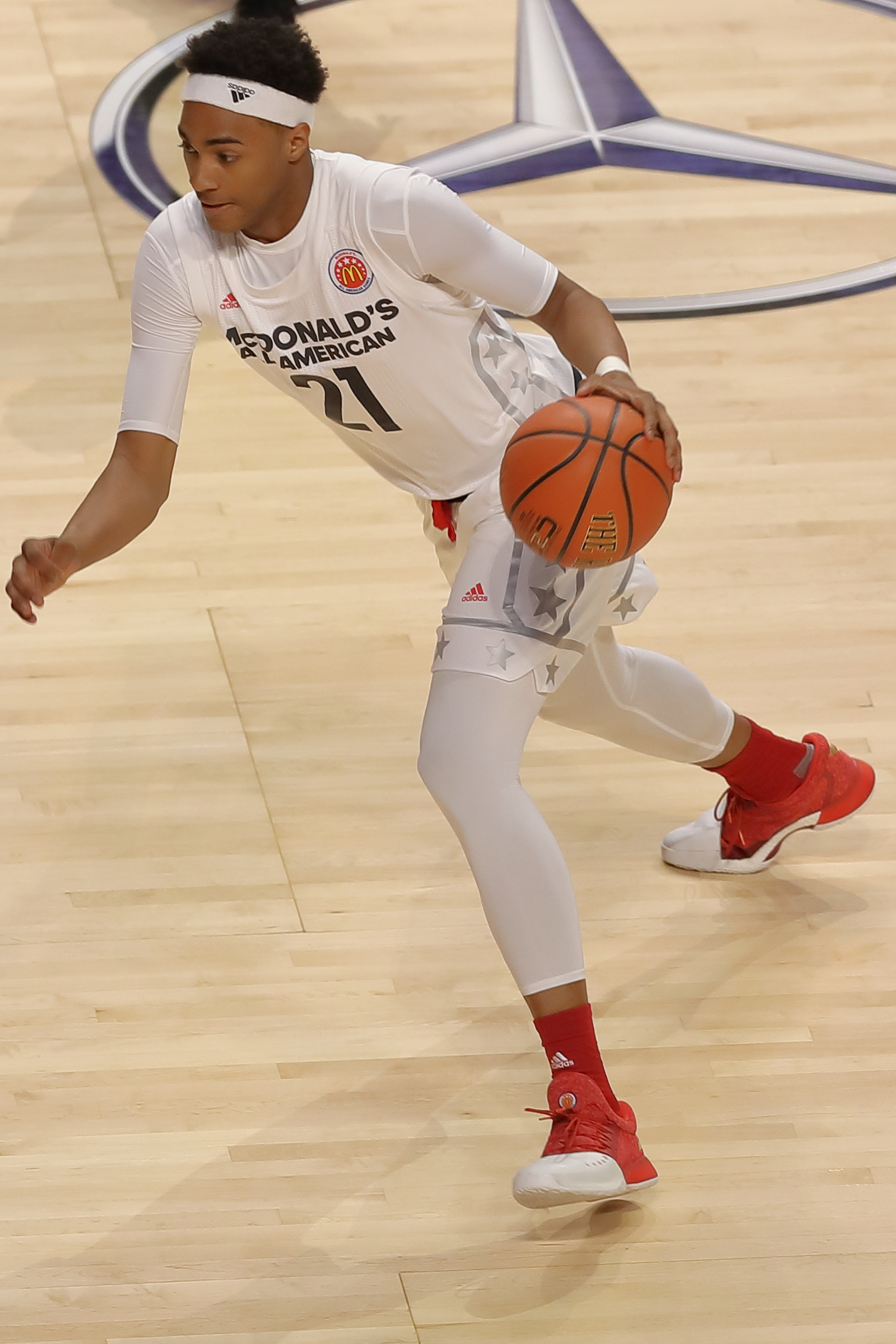
USC recruit Charles O'Bannon Jr. at the 2017 McDonald's All-American Boys Game.

The 2017–18 USC Trojans men's basketball team represented the University of Southern California during the 2017–18 NCAA Division I men's basketball season. Led by fifth-year head coach Andy Enfield, they played their home games at the Galen Center in Los Angeles, California as members of the Pac-12 Conference. They finished the season 24–12, 12–6 in Pac-12 play to finish in second place. As the No. 2 seed in the Pac-12 tournament, they defeated Oregon State in the quarterfinals and Oregon in the semifinals before losing to Arizona in the championship game. They were one of the last four teams not selected for the NCAA tournament and as a result earned a No. 1 seed in the National Invitation Tournament, where they defeated UNC Asheville in the first round before losing to Western Kentucky in the second round.

== Previous season ==
The Trojans finished the 2016–17 season 26–10, 10–8 in Pac-12 play to finish in a tie for fifth place; their 26 victories set a program record. They defeated Washington in the first round of the Pac-12 tournament before losing in the quarterfinals to UCLA. They received an at-large bid to the NCAA tournament where they defeated Providence in the First Four and SMU in the First Round before losing in the Second Round to Baylor.

== FBI investigation ==
On September 26, federal prosecutors in New York announced charges of fraud and corruption against 10 people involved in college basketball, including USC assistant coach Tony Bland. The charges allege that Bland and others allegedly received benefits from financial advisers and others to influence student-athletes to retain their services. Following the announcement, USC placed Bland on administrative leave and announced that it would conduct an internal investigation of the matter. Potential 2018 NBA draft pick De'Anthony Melton would be indefinitely suspended in relation to the scandal in January before leaving USC on February 21, 2018.

== Off-season ==
=== Departures ===
Name	Pos.	Height	Weight	Year	Hometown	Reason for departure
Charles Buggs	PF	6'9"	230	RS Sr.	Arlington, TX	Graduated
Samer Dhillon	SF	6'8"	210	Sr.	Sacramento, CA	Walk-on; Graduated

=== 2017 recruiting class ===
College recruiting
Name	Hometown	School	Height	Weight	Commit date
Jordan Usher; SF	Marietta, GA	Wheeler HS	6 ft 7 in (2.01 m)	210 lb (95 kg)	May 10, 2016
Jordan Usher; SF	Recruit ratings: Scout: Rivals: 247Sports: ESPN: (83)				
Victor Uyaelunmo; C	Miami, FL	Calvary Christian HS	6 ft 10.75 in (2.10 m)	213 lb (97 kg)	Sep 11, 2016
Victor Uyaelunmo; C	Recruit ratings: Scout: Rivals: 247Sports: ESPN: (82)				
Charles O'Bannon Jr. G/F	Las Vegas, NV	Bishop Gorman HS	6 ft 5.75 in (1.97 m)	196 lb (89 kg)	Dec 13, 2016
Charles O'Bannon Jr. G/F	Recruit ratings: Scout: Rivals: 247Sports: ESPN: (90)				
Overall recruit ranking:
Note: In many cases, Scout, Rivals, 247Sports, On3, and ESPN may conflict in their listings of height and weight.; In these cases, the average was taken. ESPN grades are on a 100-point scale.; Sources: "USC 2017 Basketball Commitments". Rivals.; "2017 USC Trojans Recruiting Class". ESPN.; "2017 Team Ranking". Rivals.; "2017 USC 24/7 Sports Commits". 247Sports.

=== Future recruits ===
College recruiting (2018)
Name	Hometown	School	Height	Weight	Commit date
Kevin Porter Jr. SG	Seattle, WA	Rainier Beach HS	6 ft 5 in (1.96 m)	200 lb (91 kg)	Feb 7, 2017
Kevin Porter Jr. SG	Recruit ratings: Scout: Rivals: 247Sports: ESPN: (89)				
Elijah Weaver; PG	Oldsmar, FL	Oldsmar Christian School	6 ft 4 in (1.93 m)	195 lb (88 kg)	Oct 23, 2017
Elijah Weaver; PG	Recruit ratings: Scout: Rivals: 247Sports: ESPN: (89)				
J'Raan Brooks; PF	Seattle, WA	Garfield HS	6 ft 8 in (2.03 m)	215 lb (98 kg)	Mar 11, 2018
J'Raan Brooks; PF	Recruit ratings: Scout: Rivals: 247Sports: ESPN: (84)				
Overall recruit ranking:
Note: In many cases, Scout, Rivals, 247Sports, On3, and ESPN may conflict in their listings of height and weight.; In these cases, the average was taken. ESPN grades are on a 100-point scale.; Sources: "2018 Team Ranking". Rivals.

== Roster ==
2017–18 USC Trojans men's basketball team
Players
Coaches

Pos.	#	Name	Height	Weight	Year	Previous school	Hometown
G	0	Shaqquan Aaron	6 ft 7 in (2.01 m)	195 lb (88 kg)	RS Jr	Louisville	Seattle, Washington
G/F	1	Jordan Usher	6 ft 7 in (2.01 m)	225 lb (102 kg)	Fr	Joseph Wheeler HS	Canton, Georgia
G	2	Jonah Mathews	6 ft 3 in (1.91 m)	195 lb (88 kg)	So	Santa Monica HS	Santa Monica, California
F	3	Harrison Henderson	6 ft 10 in (2.08 m)	225 lb (102 kg)	So	South Grand Prairie HS	Dallas, Texas
F	4	Chimezie Metu	6 ft 11 in (2.11 m)	225 lb (102 kg)	Jr	Lawndale HS	Lawndale, California
G	5	Derryck Thornton	6 ft 2 in (1.88 m)	195 lb (88 kg)	RS So	Duke	Los Angeles, California
G	11	Jordan McLaughlin	6 ft 1 in (1.85 m)	185 lb (84 kg)	Sr	Etiwanda HS	Etiwanda, California
G	12	Devin Fleming (W)	6 ft 2 in (1.88 m)	190 lb (86 kg)	Jr	Valley View HS	Moreno Valley, California
G	13	Charles O'Bannon Jr.	6 ft 6 in (1.98 m)	210 lb (95 kg)	Fr	Bishop Gorman HS	Las Vegas, Nevada
G	21	Kurt Karis (W)	6 ft 1 in (1.85 m)	195 lb (88 kg)	RS Sr	Chicago State	Northbrook, Illinois
F	25	Bennie Boatwright (injured)	6 ft 10 in (2.08 m)	227 lb (103 kg)	Jr	Village Christian	Mission Hills, California
G	30	Elijah Stewart	6 ft 5 in (1.96 m)	195 lb (88 kg)	Sr	Westchester	DeRidder, Louisiana
C	31	Nick Rakocevic	6 ft 11 in (2.11 m)	230 lb (104 kg)	So	St. Joseph HS	Chicago, Illinois
C	34	Victor Uyaelunmo	6 ft 11 in (2.11 m)	220 lb (100 kg)	Fr	Calvary Christian HS	Miami, Florida

Head coach

- Andy Enfield (Johns Hopkins)

Assistant coach(es)

- Jason Hart (Syracuse)
- Martin Bahar (Vanderbilt)
- Chris Capko (South Florida)

Legend

- (C) Team captain
- (S) Suspended
- (I) Ineligible
- (W) Walk-on
- Injured
- Current redshirt

Roster
Last update: November 2, 2017

- Sophomore guard De'Anthony Melton was officially ruled ineligible to play for the remainder of the season by USC amid an FBI bribery investigation. He later left USC on February 21, 2018 for the 2018 NBA draft.
- Feb. 16, 2018 - Sophomore forward Bennie Boatwright to miss the remainder of the season with a left leg injury.

== Schedule and results ==
Date time, TV	Rank^{#}	Opponent^{#}	Result	Record	High points	High rebounds	High assists	Site (attendance) city, state
Non-conference regular season
November 10, 2017*; 7:00 pm, P12N	No. 10	Cal State Fullerton	W 84–42	1–0	18 – Metu	10 – Metu	6 – McLaughlin	Galen Center (6,327); Los Angeles, CA
November 13, 2017*; 8:00 pm, P12N	No. 10	North Dakota State	W 75–65	2–0	28 – Boatwright	8 – Tied	4 – McLaughlin	Galen Center (2,402); Los Angeles, CA
November 19, 2017*; 6:00 pm, SECN	No. 10	at Vanderbilt	W 93–89 ^{OT}	3–0	35 – McLaughlin	8 – Metu	4 – McLaughlin	Memorial Gymnasium (8,284); Nashville, TN
November 22, 2017*; 7:00 pm, P12N	No. 10	Lehigh	W 88–63	4–0	19 – Boatwright	11 – Boatwright	7 – McLaughlin	Galen Center (3,125); Los Angeles, CA
November 26, 2017*; 7:00 pm, P12N	No. 10	No. 16 Texas A&M	L 59–75	4–1	13 – Metu	8 – Metu	7 – McLaughlin	Galen Center (5,347); Los Angeles, CA
December 2, 2017*; 7:00 pm, ESPNU	No. 14	at SMU	L 55–72	4–2	13 – Metu	8 – Boatwright	7 – McLaughlin	Moody Coliseum (6,918); Dallas, TX
December 8, 2017*; 7:30 pm, ESPN2	No. 25	vs. Oklahoma; Basketball Hall of Fame Classic	L 83–85	4–3	23 – Stewart	11 – Metu	9 – McLaughlin	Staples Center (6,456); Los Angeles, CA
December 14, 2017*; 7:00 pm, P12N		Santa Clara	W 82–59	5–3	21 – Boatright	11 – Tied	10 – McLaughlin	Galen Center (2,712); Los Angeles, CA
December 17, 2017*; 5:00 pm, P12N		UC Santa Barbara	W 98–87	6–3	31 – Metu	12 – Rakocevic	19 – McLaughlin	Galen Center (3,519); Los Angeles, CA
December 19, 2017*; 8:00 pm, P12N		Princeton; Diamond Head Classic non-bracket game	L 93–103 ^{OT}	6–4	25 – Metu	10 – Metu	8 – McLaughlin	Galen Center (4,041); Los Angeles, CA
December 22, 2017*; 5:00 pm, ESPN2		vs. Akron; Diamond Head Classic quarterfinals	W 84–53	7–4	20 – Stewart	9 – Rakocevic	6 – Mclaughlin	Stan Sheriff Center; Honolulu, HI
December 23, 2017*; 1:30 pm, ESPN2		vs. Middle Tennessee; Diamond Head Classic semifinals	W 89–84	8–4	13 – Metu	6 – Metu	5 – McLaughlin	Stan Sheriff Center; Honolulu, HI
December 25, 2017*; 3:00 pm, ESPN2		vs. New Mexico State; Diamond Head Classic championship	W 77–72	9–4	33 – Boatwright	7 – Boatwright	8 – McLaughlin	Stan Sheriff Center; Honolulu, HI
Pac-12 regular season
December 29, 2017; 7:30 pm, P12N		Washington	L 81–88	9–5 (0–1)	26 – Metu	10 – Metu	8 – McLaughlin	Galen Center (3,104); Los Angeles, CA
December 31, 2017; 6:00 pm, ESPN2		Washington State	W 89–71	10–5 (1–1)	17 – Stewart	7 – Boatwright	11 – McLaughlin	Galen Center (2,518); Los Angeles, CA
January 4, 2018; 7:30 pm, P12N		at California	W 80–62	11–5 (2–1)	19 – Rakoocevic	7 – 3 tied	8 – McLaughlin	Haas Pavilion (6,915); Berkeley, CA
January 7, 2018; 7:00 pm, FS1		at Stanford	L 76–77	11–6 (2–2)	20 – Metu	11 – Boatwright	7 – McLaughlin	Maples Pavilion (4,087); Stanford, CA
January 10, 2018; 7:00 pm, FS1		Colorado	W 70–58	12–6 (3–2)	20 – McLaughlin	13 – Metu	3 – McLaughlin	Galen Center (3,669); Los Angeles, CA
January 14, 2018; 5:00 pm, ESPNU		Utah	W 84–67	13–6 (4–2)	17 – Mathews	8 – Boatwright	7 – McLaughlin	Galen Center (4,822); Los Angeles, CA
January 18, 2018; 6:00 pm, ESPN2		at Oregon	W 75–70	14–6 (5–2)	18 – 2 tied	9 – McLaughlin	7 – McLaughlin	Matthew Knight Arena (9,202); Eugene, OR
January 20, 2018; 5:00 pm, P12N		at Oregon State	W 74–67	15–6 (6–2)	18 – Stewart	6 – Mathews	6 – McLaughlin	Gill Coliseum (6,301); Corvallis, OR
January 24, 2018; 6:00 pm, ESPNU		Stanford	W 69–64	16–6 (7–2)	18 – Mathews	10 – Metu	9 – McLaughlin	Galen Canter (4,116); Los Angeles, CA
January 28, 2018; 1:00 pm, P12N		California	W 77–59	17–6 (8–2)	16 – Tied	8 – Tied	10 – McLaughlin	Galen Center (6,144); Los Angeles, CA
February 3, 2018; 3:00 pm, ESPN2		at UCLA; Rivalry	L 79–82	17–7 (8–3)	20 – Stewart	12 – Metu	8 – McLaughlin	Pauley Pavilion (12,837); Los Angeles, CA
February 8, 2018; 8:00 pm, ESPN2		at Arizona State	L 78–80	17–8 (8–4)	19 – Rakocevic	8 – Boatwright	4 – McLaughlin	Wells Fargo Arena (12,377); Tempe, AZ
February 10, 2018; 7:15 pm, ESPN		at No. 13 Arizona	L 67–81	17–9 (8–5)	18 – Metu	9 – Rakocevic	5 – McLaughlin	McKale Center (14,644); Tucson, AZ
February 15, 2018; 6:00 pm, ESPN2		Oregon	W 72–70	18–9 (9–5)	20 – Mathews	10 – Metu	11 – McLaughlin	Galen Center (4,322); Los Angeles, CA
February 17, 2018; 8:00 pm, FS1		Oregon State	W 72–59	19–9 (10–5)	28 – Stewart	7 – Metu	11 – McLaughlin	Galen Center (4,542); Los Angeles, CA
February 21, 2018; 7:30 pm, FS1		at Colorado	W 75–64	20–9 (11–5)	21 – Metu	6 – Rakocevic	7 – McLaughlin	Coors Events Center (7,008); Boulder, CO
February 24, 2018; 11:30 am, P12N		at Utah	W 74–58	21–9 (12–5)	14 – Tied	9 – Metu	5 – McLaughlin	Jon M. Huntsman Center (13,598); Salt Lake City, UT
March 3, 2018; 7:15 pm, ESPN		UCLA; Rivalry	L 72–83	21–10 (12–6)	19 – McLaughlin	10 – Metu	4 – McLaughlin	Galen Center (10,258); Los Angeles, CA
Pac-12 Tournament
March 8, 2018; 6:00 pm, P12N	(2)	vs. (10) Oregon State; Quarterfinals	W 61–48	22–10	22 – Metu	11 – Metu	4 – McLaughlin	T-Mobile Arena (13,194); Paradise, NV
March 9, 2018; 8:30 pm, FS1	(2)	vs. (6) Oregon; Semifinals	W 74–54	23–10	27 – Mathews	11 – Rakocevic	9 – McLaughlin	T-Mobile Arena (16,596); Paradise, NV
March 10, 2018; 7:00 pm, FS1	(2)	vs. (1) No. 15 Arizona; Championship	L 61–75	23–11	13 – Rakocevic	6 – Rakocevic	9 – McLaughlin	T-Mobile Arena (16,501); Paradise, NV
NIT
March 13, 2018*; 8:00 pm, ESPN2	(1)	(8) UNC Asheville; First Round – USC Bracket	W 103–98 ^{2OT}	24–11	26 – McLaughlin	19 – Rakocevic	13 – McLaughlin	Galen Center (1,614); Los Angeles, CA
March 19, 2018*; 8:30 pm, ESPN2	(1)	(4) Western Kentucky; Second Round – USC Bracket	L 75–79	24–12	20 – Stewart	10 – Rakocevic	13 – McLaughlin	Galen Center (2,130); Los Angeles, CA
*Non-conference game. ^{#}Rankings from AP Poll. (#) Tournament seedings in parentheses. All times are in Pacific Time.

== Ranking movement ==
Ranking movement Legend: ██ Increase in ranking. ██ Decrease in ranking. RV=Received votes.
Poll	Pre	Wk 2	Wk 3	Wk 4	Wk 5	Wk 6	Wk 7	Wk 8	Wk 9	Wk 10	Wk 11	Wk 12	Wk 13	Wk 14	Wk 15	Wk 16	Wk 17	Wk 18	Post	Final
AP	10	10	10	14	25	NR														N/A*
Coaches	11		10	18	25	NR														
