= M. J. Rice =

American basketball player

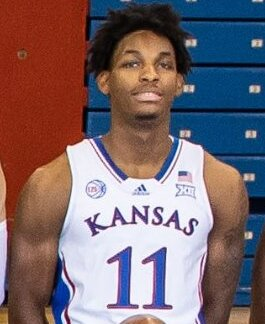
- Rice in 2022

Cape Fear Sea Devils
- Position: Shooting guard

Personal information
- Born: February 5, 2003 (age 23) Henderson, North Carolina, U.S.
- Listed height: 6 ft 5 in (1.96 m)
- Listed weight: 215 lb (98 kg)

Career information
- High school: Durham Academy (Durham, North Carolina); Oak Hill Academy (Mouth of Wilson, Virginia); Prolific Prep (Napa, California)
- College: Kansas (2022–2023); NC State (2023–2024); Cape Fear CC (2025–present)

Career highlights
- McDonald's All-American (2022)

Marquise Jacari Rice (born February 5, 2003) is an American basketball player at Cape Fear Community College. He has played for the Kansas Jayhawks and the NC State Wolfpack.

== Early life and high school career ==
Rice grew up in Henderson, North Carolina and initially attended Durham Academy. He tore his ACL as a sophomore. Rice transferred to Oak Hill Academy in Mouth of Wilson, Virginia after his sophomore year. He averaged 19.6 points per game at Oak Hill as a junior before transferring to Prolific Prep in Napa, California before the start of his senior year. Rice averaged 20.1 points, 5.3 rebounds, and 2.3 assists per game during his senior season. He was selected to play in the 2022 McDonald's All-American Boys Game during the season.

=== Recruiting ===
Rice was considered a five-star recruit by Rivals, and a four-star recruit by ESPN and 247Sports. On August 10, 2021, he committed to playing college basketball for Kansas over offers from Pittsburgh, Oklahoma State, and NC State. Rice also considered playing professionally in the NBA G League.

College recruiting
Name	Hometown	School	Height	Weight	Commit date
M. J. Rice; SF	Henderson, NC	Prolific Prep (CA)	6 ft 5 in (1.96 m)	225 lb (102 kg)	Aug 10, 2021
M. J. Rice; SF	Recruit ratings: Rivals: 247Sports: ESPN: (89)				
Overall recruit ranking: Rivals: 29 247Sports: 37 ESPN: 33
Note: In many cases, Scout, Rivals, 247Sports, On3, and ESPN may conflict in their listings of height and weight.; In these cases, the average was taken. ESPN grades are on a 100-point scale.; Sources: "Kansas 2022 Basketball Commitments". Rivals.; "2022 Kansas Jayhawks Recruiting Class". ESPN.; "2022 Team Ranking". Rivals.

== College career ==
Rice enrolled at Kansas shortly after graduating high school and took part in the Jayhawks' summer practices. He entered his freshman season as a reserve shooting guard. Rice made his college debut in the second game of the season against North Dakota State, scoring 10 points on 5-of-10 shooting in a 82–59 win. Rice missed several games in December 2022 and January 2023 due to back spasms. He played in 23 of Kansas' 36 games during his freshman season and averaged 7.6 minutes of play with 2.2 points and one rebound per game. After the season, Rice entered the NCAA transfer portal.

Rice ultimately transferred to NC State. After playing in nine games, he announced that he would sit out the rest of the season and utilize a redshirt. Rice later left the program.

Rice enrolled at Cape Fear Community College in August 2025.

== Career statistics ==
Legend
GP	Games played	GS	Games started	MPG	Minutes per game
FG%	Field goal percentage	3P%	3-point field goal percentage	FT%	Free throw percentage
RPG	Rebounds per game	APG	Assists per game	SPG	Steals per game
BPG	Blocks per game	PPG	Points per game	**Bold**	Career high

=== College ===
Year	Team	GP	GS	MPG	FG%	3P%	FT%	RPG	APG	SPG	BPG	PPG
2022–23	Kansas	23	0	7.6	.408	.200	.667	1.0	.2	.3	.1	2.2
