= Mike Miles Jr. =

American basketball player (born 2002)

Mike Miles
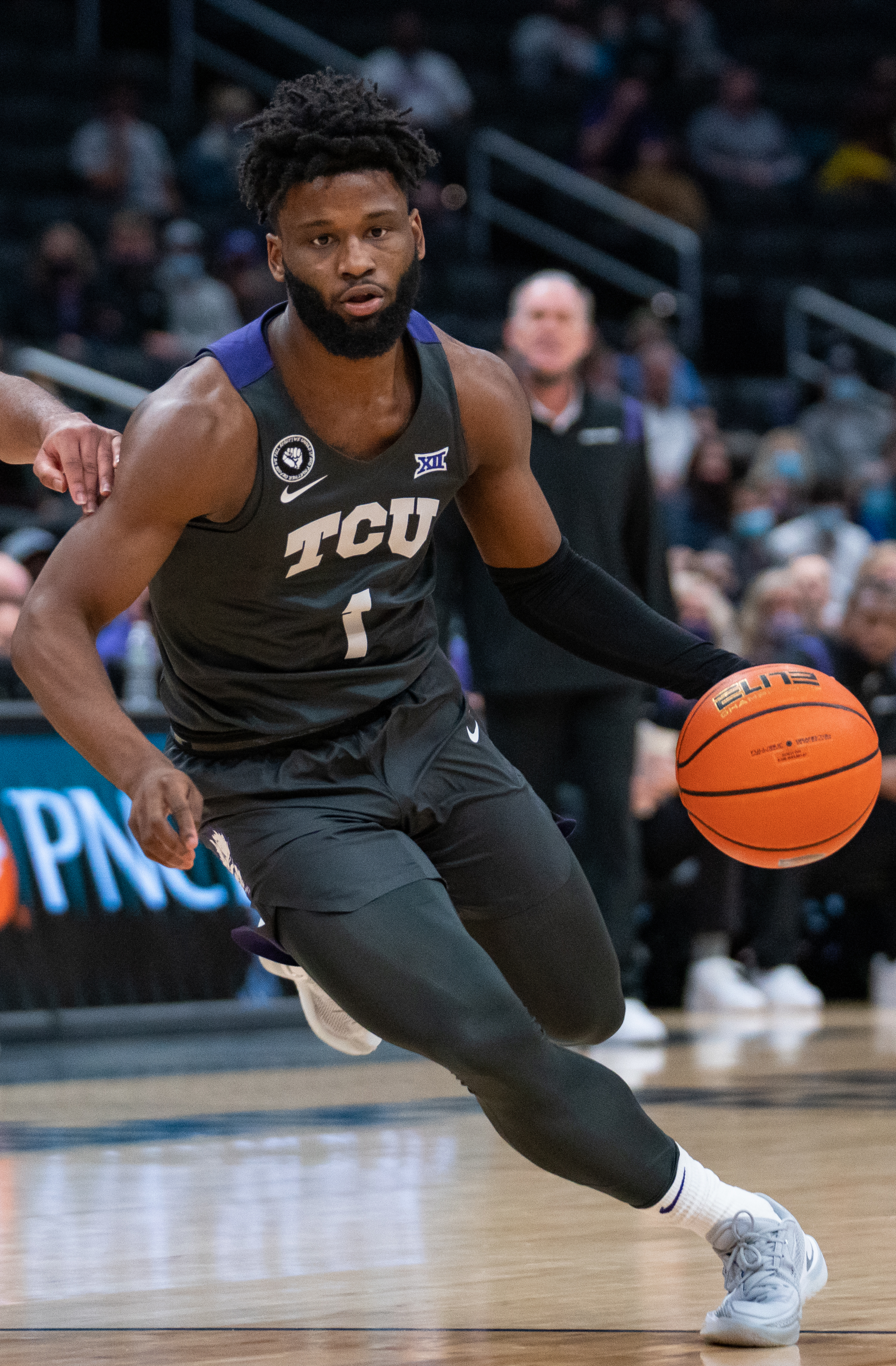
- Miles with TCU in 2021

No. 3 – Paisas
- Position: Point guard / Shooting guard
- League: Baloncesto Profesional Colombiano

Personal information
- Born: August 24, 2002 (age 24) Highland Hills, Dallas, Texas, U.S.A.
- Listed height: 6 ft 2 in (1.88 m)
- Listed weight: 220 lb (100 kg)

Career information
- High school: Lancaster (Lancaster, Texas)
- College: TCU (2020–2023)
- NBA draft: 2023: undrafted
- Playing career: 2023–present

Career history
- 2023–2024: Texas Legends
- 2024: Iowa Wolves
- 2024–2026: Windy City Bulls
- 2026–present: Paisas de Medellín

Career highlights
- 2× Second-team All-Big 12 (2022, 2023); Big 12 All-Freshman Team (2021)
- Stats at NBA.com
- Stats at Basketball Reference
Medals
Men's basketball
Representing United States
FIBA Under-19 World Cup
Gold medal – first place	2021 Latvia	Team

Michael Derrell Miles Jr. (born August 24, 2002) is an American professional basketball player for Paisas de Medellín of the Baloncesto Profesional Colombiano. He played college basketball at TCU.

== Early life and high school career ==
Miles grew up playing basketball for the Texas Titans on the Amateur Athletic Union (AAU) circuit alongside Cade Cunningham. When Miles was in fourth grade, his AAU highlight videos drew national attention; Yahoo Sports labeled him "the elementary school Allen Iverson." He attended Lancaster High School in Lancaster, Texas. As a junior, he averaged 18 points, 4.5 assists and 2.3 steals per game, leading his team to a 31–3 record. As a senior, Miles averaged 21.4 points, four rebounds, four assists and three steals per game, leading his team to a 36–1 record. He was named SportsDayHS All-Area Player of the Year by The Dallas Morning News, as well as Class 5A Player of the Year. Miles committed to playing college basketball for TCU over offers from LSU, Oregon and Oklahoma State, among other programs.

== College career ==
On January 30, 2021, Miles recorded a freshman season-high 28 points and five assists in a 102–98 overtime loss to Missouri. As a freshman, he averaged 13.6 points, 3.5 rebounds and 3.1 assists per game. Miles was named to the Big 12 All-Freshman Team and earned All-Big 12 honorable mention. As a sophomore, he averaged 15.4 points, 3.8 assists and 3.5 rebounds per game. He was named to the Second Team All-Big 12 as a sophomore. On March 30, 2022, Miles declared for the 2022 NBA draft, forgoing his remaining college eligibility. However, he later clarified that he did not hire an agent and is maintaining his college eligibility. On April 11, Miles withdrew from the draft and announced he would return to TCU for his junior season. He was named to the Second Team All-Big 12 as a junior.

== Professional career ==
=== Texas Legends (2023–2024) ===
After going undrafted in the 2023 NBA draft, Miles signed a two-way contract with the Dallas Mavericks. However, he was waived on October 14. On October 29, he joined the Texas Legends.

On July 26, 2024, Miles signed with Greek club Aris Midea, but parted ways with the team, citing personal reasons in August.

=== Iowa Wolves (2024) ===
On October 25, 2024, Miles joined the Iowa Wolves. However, he was waived on December 13.

=== Windy City Bulls (2024–2026) ===
On December 27, 2024, Miles joined the Windy City Bulls.

== National team career ==
Miles represented the United States at the 2021 FIBA Under-19 World Cup in Latvia. He averaged 9.1 points, 3.9 assists and 3.3 rebounds per game, helping his team win the gold medal.

== Personal life ==
Miles is the son of Jeanee Miles.

== Career statistics ==
Legend
GP	Games played	GS	Games started	MPG	Minutes per game
FG%	Field goal percentage	3P%	3-point field goal percentage	FT%	Free throw percentage
RPG	Rebounds per game	APG	Assists per game	SPG	Steals per game
BPG	Blocks per game	PPG	Points per game	**Bold**	Career high

=== College ===
Year	Team	GP	GS	MPG	FG%	3P%	FT%	RPG	APG	SPG	BPG	PPG
2020–21	TCU	25	21	32.9	.413	.360	**.827**	**3.5**	3.1	1.0	.2	13.6
2021–22	TCU	**31**	**31**	**33.4**	.382	.295	.759	**3.5**	**3.8**	**1.2**	.2	15.4
2022–23	TCU	27	26	31.9	**.497**	**.362**	.749	2.7	2.7	**1.2**	**.3**	**17.9**
Career		83	78	32.7	.426	.334	.767	3.3	3.2	1.1	.2	15.6
