= 2022–23 Kansas State Wildcats men's basketball team =

2022–23 Kansas State Wildcats men's basketball

Cayman Islands Classic Champions

NCAA tournament, Elite Eight
- Conference: Big 12 Conference

Ranking
- Coaches: No. 9
- AP: No. 15
- Record: 26–10 (11–7 Big 12)
- Head coach: Jerome Tang (1st season)
- Associate head coach: Ulric Maligi (1st season)
- Assistant coaches: Jareem Dowling; Rodney Perry
- Home arena: Bramlage Coliseum

2022–23 Big 12 men's basketball standings
	Conf.				Overall
Team	W		L	PCT	W		L	PCT
No. 4 Kansas	13	–	5	.722	28	–	8	.778
No. 5 Texas †	12	–	6	.667	29	–	9	.763
No. 15 Kansas State	11	–	7	.611	26	–	10	.722
No. 11 Baylor	11	–	7	.611	23	–	11	.676
Iowa State	9	–	9	.500	19	–	14	.576
No. 22 TCU	9	–	9	.500	22	–	13	.629
Oklahoma State	8	–	10	.444	20	–	16	.556
West Virginia	7	–	11	.389	19	–	15	.559
Texas Tech	5	–	13	.278	16	–	16	.500
Oklahoma	5	–	13	.278	15	–	17	.469
† 2023 Big 12 tournament winner Rankings from AP poll

The 2022–23 Kansas State Wildcats men's basketball team represented Kansas State University in the 2022–23 NCAA Division I men's basketball season, their 120th basketball season. The Wildcats were led by first-year head coach Jerome Tang and played their home games in Bramlage Coliseum in Manhattan, Kansas as members of the Big 12 Conference. They finished the season 26–10, 11–7 in Big 12 play to finish in a tie for third place. They lost in the quarterfinals of the Big 12 tournament to TCU. They received an at-large bid to the NCAA tournament as the No. 3 seed in the East region. They defeated Montana State, Kentucky, and Michigan State to advance to the Elite Eight. There they lost to Florida Atlantic.

== Previous season ==
The Wildcats finished the 2021–22 season 14–17, 6–12 in Big 12 play to finish ninth place. They lost to West Virginia in the first round of the Big 12 tournament.

On March 10, 2022, head coach Bruce Weber announced he was stepping down as head coach. On March 21, the school named longtime Baylor assistant Jerome Tang the team's new head coach.

== Offseason ==
=== Departures ===
Name	Number	Pos.	Height	Weight	Year	Hometown	Reason for departure
Mike McGuirl	00	G	6'3"	200	GS Senior	Ellington, CT	Graduated
Maximus Edwards	2	G	6'5"	220	Freshman	Stratford, CT	Transferred to George Washington
Selton Miguel	3	G/F	6'4"	210	Sophomore	Luanda, Angola	Transferred to South Florida
Seryee Lewis	4	F	6'9"	230	Sophomore	Chicago, IL	Transferred to Rice
Carlton Linguard Jr.	12	F	7'0"	220	Junior	San Antonio, TX	Transferred to UTSA
Mark Smith	13	G	6'4"	225	GS Senior	Edwardsville, IL	Graduated/signed to play professional in Germany with BG Göttingen
Drew Honas	14	G	6'2"	175	Senior	Medicine Lodge, KS	Walk-on; transferred
Trey Harris	15	G	5'11"	165	Sophomore	Bloomington, IL	Walk-on; left the team for personal reasons
Kaosi Ezeagu	20	F	6'10"	255	RS Junior	Brampton, ON	Transferred to Sam Houston State
Davion Bradford	21	F	7'0"	270	Sophomore	St. Louis, MO	Transferred to Wake Forest
Luke Kasubke	22	G	6'5"	190	Sophomore	St. Louis, MO	Transferred to Illinois State
Jordan Brooks	23	F	6'4"	190	Sophomore	Grayson, KY	Walk-on; left the team for personal reasons
Nijel Pack	24	G	6'0"	180	Sophomore	Indianapolis, IN	Transferred to Miami (FL)
Logan Landers	33	F	6'9"	215	Freshman	Cedarburg, WI	Transferred to Grand Canyon

=== Incoming transfers ===
Name	Number	Pos.	Height	Weight	Year	Hometown	Previous school
David N'Guessan	3	F	6'9"	205	Junior	De Lier, Netherlands	Virginia Tech
Tykei Greene	4	G	6'4"	205	RS Senior	Queens, NY	Stony Brook
Cam Carter	5	G	6'3"	185	Sophomore	Donaldsonville, LA	Mississippi State
Keyontae Johnson	11	G/F	6'6"	229	GS Senior	Norfolk, VA	Florida
Anthony Thomas	12	F	6'7"	180	Sophomore	Silver Spring, MD	Tallahassee CC
Desi Sills	13	G	6'2"	195	Senior	Jonesboro, AR	Arkansas State
Jerrell Colbert	20	C	6'10"	216	Sophomore	Houston, TX	LSU
Nate Awbrey	21	G	6'3"		Senior	Manhattan, KS	Manhattan Christian College
Abayomi Iyiola	23	F	6'10"	215	GS Senior	Atlanta, GA	Hofstra
Nae'Qwan Tomlin	35	F	6'10"	195	Junior	New York, NY	Chipola College

=== Recruiting classes ===
==== 2022 recruiting class ====
College recruiting information
Name	Hometown	School	Height	Weight	Commit date
Taj Manning #39 PF	La Porte, IN	La Lumiere School	6 ft 7 in (2.01 m)	200 lb (91 kg)	Sep 25, 2021
Taj Manning #39 PF	Recruit ratings: Scout: Rivals: 247Sports: ESPN: (79)				
Dorian Finister; SG	New Orleans, LA	Carver High School	6 ft 5 in (1.96 m)	180 lb (82 kg)	May 2, 2022
Dorian Finister; SG	Recruit ratings: Scout: Rivals: 247Sports: ESPN: (NR)				
Overall recruit ranking: Scout: Not Ranked Top 20 Rivals: Not Ranked Top 25 ESPN: Not Ranked Top 25
Note: In many cases, Scout, Rivals, 247Sports, On3, and ESPN may conflict in their listings of height and weight.; In these cases, the average was taken. ESPN grades are on a 100-point scale.; Sources: "2022 Kansas State Basketball Commits". Rivals.; "2022 Kansas State Basketball Commits". Scout.; "2022 Kansas State Basketball Commits". ESPN.; "Scout.com Team Recruiting Rankings". Scout.; "2022 Team Ranking". Rivals.

==== 2023 recruiting class ====
College recruiting information (2023)
Name	Hometown	School	Height	Weight	Commit date
R.J. Jones #7 SG	Aubrey, TX	Wasatch Academy	6 ft 3 in (1.91 m)	180 lb (82 kg)	Sep 7, 2022
R.J. Jones #7 SG	Recruit ratings: Scout: Rivals: 247Sports: ESPN: (86)				
Dai Dai Ames #12 PG	Chicago, IL	Kenwood Academy High School	6 ft 1 in (1.85 m)	170 lb (77 kg)	Jul 20, 2022
Dai Dai Ames #12 PG	Recruit ratings: Scout: Rivals: 247Sports: ESPN: (83)				
Overall recruit ranking: Scout: Not Ranked Top 20 Rivals: Not Ranked Top 25 ESPN: Not Ranked Top 25
Note: In many cases, Scout, Rivals, 247Sports, On3, and ESPN may conflict in their listings of height and weight.; In these cases, the average was taken. ESPN grades are on a 100-point scale.; Sources: "2023 Kansas State Basketball Commits". Rivals.; "2023 Kansas State Basketball Commits". Scout.; "2023 Kansas State Basketball Commits". ESPN.; "Scout.com Team Recruiting Rankings". Scout.; "2023 Team Ranking". Rivals.

== Roster ==
2022–23 Kansas State Wildcats men's basketball team
Players
Coaches

Pos.	#	Name	Height	Weight	Year	Previous school	Hometown
G	1	Markquis Nowell	5 ft 8 in (1.73 m)	160 lb (73 kg)	Sr	Little Rock	Harlem, New York
F	3	David N'Guessan	6 ft 9 in (2.06 m)	205 lb (93 kg)	Jr	Virginia Tech	De Lier, Netherlands
G	4	Tykei Greene	6 ft 4 in (1.93 m)	205 lb (93 kg)	RS Sr	Stony Brook	Queens, New York
G	5	Cam Carter	6 ft 3 in (1.91 m)	185 lb (84 kg)	So	Mississippi State	Donaldsonville, Louisiana
F	11	Keyontae Johnson	6 ft 6 in (1.98 m)	229 lb (104 kg)	GS	Florida	Norfolk, Virginia
G/F	12	Anthony Thomas	6 ft 7 in (2.01 m)	180 lb (82 kg)	So	Tallahassee Community College	Silver Spring, Maryland
G	13	Desi Sills	6 ft 3 in (1.91 m)	200 lb (91 kg)	Sr	Arkansas State	Jonesboro, Arkansas
F	15	Taj Manning	6 ft 8 in (2.03 m)	215 lb (98 kg)	Fr	La Lumiere School	Grandview, Missouri
C	20	Jerrell Colbert	6 ft 10 in (2.08 m)	216 lb (98 kg)	So	LSU	Houston, Texas
G	21	Nate Awbrey (W)	6 ft 3 in (1.91 m)	190 lb (86 kg)	Sr	Manhattan Christian College	Manhattan, Kansas
F/C	23	Abayomi Iyiola	6 ft 10 in (2.08 m)	215 lb (98 kg)	GS	Hofstra	Atlanta, Georgia
G/F	24	Dorian Finister	6 ft 5 in (1.96 m)	180 lb (82 kg)	Fr	Carver	New Orleans, Louisiana
F	25	Ismael Massoud	6 ft 9 in (2.06 m)	210 lb (95 kg)	Jr	Wake Forest	East Harlem, New York
F/C	35	Nae'Qwan Tomlin	6 ft 10 in (2.08 m)	195 lb (88 kg)	Jr	Chipola College	Harlem, New York
G	43	Peyton Ackerman (W)	5 ft 10 in (1.78 m)	150 lb (68 kg)	Fr	Epic Charter Schools	Oklahoma City, Oklahoma

Head coach

- Jerome Tang (Charter Oak)

Assistant coach(es)

- Ulric Maligi (Howard)
- Jareem Dowling (Maryland Eastern Shore)
- Rodney Perry (Dallas Christian)

Legend

- (C) Team captain
- (S) Suspended
- (I) Ineligible
- (W) Walk-on
- Injured
- Current redshirt

Roster

== Schedule and results ==
Date time, TV	Rank^{#}	Opponent^{#}	Result	Record	High points	High rebounds	High assists	Site (attendance) city, state
Exhibition
November 1, 2022*; 7:00 p.m., ESPN+		Washburn	W 76–49		13 – Carter	7 – Tomlin	7 – Sills	Bramlage Coliseum (6,800); Manhattan, KS
Regular season
November 7, 2022*; 8:00 p.m., ESPN+		Texas–Rio Grande Valley	W 93–59	1–0	14 – Tied	8 – Tomlin	7 – Nowell	Bramlage Coliseum (7,635); Manhattan, KS
November 11, 2022*; 6:00 p.m., P12N		at California	W 63–54	2–0	16 – Johnson	9 – Johnson	7 – Nowell	Haas Pavilion (3,607); Berkeley, CA
November 17, 2022*; 5:30 p.m., ESPN+		Kansas City	W 69–53	3–0	19 – Johnson	7 – Tied	6 – Tied	Bramlage Coliseum (7,376); Manhattan, KS
November 21, 2022*; 6:30 p.m., FloSports		vs. Rhode Island; Cayman Islands Classic Quarterfinals	W 77–57	4–0	15 – Tomlin	7 – N’Guessan	12 – Nowell	John Gray Gymnasium (1,250); George Town, Cayman Islands
November 22, 2022*; 6:30 p.m., FloSports		vs. Nevada; Cayman Islands Classic Semifinals	W 96–87 ^{OT}	5–0	29 – Nowell	9 – Johnson	11 – Nowell	John Gray Gymnasium (1,200); George Town, Cayman Islands
November 23, 2022*; 6:30 p.m., FloSports		vs. LSU; Cayman Islands Classic Championship	W 61–59	6–0	18 – Nowell	7 – Carter	5 – Sills	John Gray Gymnasium (2,400); George Town, Cayman Islands
November 30, 2022*; 5:30 p.m., FS1		at Butler; Big East–Big 12 Battle	L 64–76	6–1	20 – Johnson	12 – Johnson	8 – Nowell	Hinkle Fieldhouse (7,660); Indianapolis, IN
December 3, 2022*; 8:00 p.m., ESPNU		Wichita State	W 55–50	7–1	17 – Johnson	6 – Tied	7 – Nowell	Bramlage Coliseum (8,957); Manhattan, KS
December 6, 2022*; 7:00 p.m., ESPN+		Abilene Christian	W 81–64	8–1	23 – N’Guessan	8 – Tomlin	12 – Nowell	Bramlage Coliseum (7,136); Manhattan, KS
December 11, 2022*; 2:00 p.m., ESPN+		Incarnate Word	W 98–50	9–1	18 – Johnson	9 – Tomlin	8 – Nowell	Bramlage Coliseum (7,042); Manhattan, KS
December 17, 2022*; 6:00 p.m., ESPN+		vs. Nebraska; Wildcat Classic	W 71–56	10–1	23 – Johnson	11 – Johnson	7 – Nowell	T-Mobile Center (13,184); Kansas City, MO
December 21, 2022*; 1:30 p.m., ESPN+		Radford	W 73–65	11–1	26 – Tomlin	9 – Tomlin	11 – Nowell	Bramlage Coliseum (6,939); Manhattan, KS
December 31, 2022; 6:00 p.m., ESPN+		No. 24 West Virginia	W 82–76 ^{OT}	12–1 (1–0)	23 – Nowell	8 – Iyiola	10 – Nowell	Bramlage Coliseum (8,199); Manhattan, KS
January 3, 2023; 8:00 p.m., LHN		at No. 6 Texas	W 116–103	13–1 (2–0)	36 – Nowell	9 – Johnson	9 – Nowell	Moody Center (10,763); Austin, TX
January 7, 2023; 5:00 p.m., ESPN+		at No. 19 Baylor	W 97–95 ^{OT}	14–1 (3–0)	32 – Nowell	9 – Johnson	14 – Nowell	Ferrell Center (9,211); Waco, TX
January 10, 2023; 6:00 p.m., ESPNU	No. 11	Oklahoma State	W 65–57	15–1 (4–0)	20 – Nowell	7 – Tied	7 – Nowell	Bramlage Coliseum (11,000); Manhattan, KS
January 14, 2023; 1:00 p.m., ESPN2	No. 11	at No. 17 TCU	L 68–82	15–2 (4–1)	18 – Johnson	10 – Tomlin	5 – Tomlin	Schollmaier Arena (5,884); Fort Worth, TX
January 17, 2023; 6:00 p.m., ESPN	No. 13	No. 2 Kansas; Sunflower Showdown	W 83–82 ^{OT}	16–2 (5–1)	24 – Tied	10 – Tomlin	7 – Nowell	Bramlage Coliseum (11,000); Manhattan, KS
January 21, 2023; 1:00 p.m., ESPN2	No. 13	Texas Tech	W 68–58	17–2 (6–1)	23 – Nowell	11 – Johnson	5 – Nowell	Bramlage Coliseum (11,000); Manhattan, KS
January 24, 2023; 8:00 p.m., ESPNU	No. 5	at No. 12 Iowa State	L 76–80	17–3 (6–2)	23 – Nowell	10 – Johnson	9 – Nowell	Hilton Coliseum (14,267); Ames, IA
January 28, 2023*; 5:00 p.m., ESPN2	No. 5	Florida; Big 12/SEC Challenge	W 64–50	18–3	13 – Tied	11 – Johnson	8 – Nowell	Bramlage Coliseum (11,000); Manhattan, KS
January 31, 2023; 7:00 p.m., ESPN+	No. 7	at No. 8 Kansas; Sunflower Showdown	L 78–90	18–4 (6–3)	23 – Nowell	12 – Johnson	4 – Nowell	Allen Fieldhouse (16,300); Lawrence, KS
February 4, 2023; 3:00 p.m., ESPN2	No. 7	No. 10 Texas	L 66–69	18–5 (6–4)	16 – Johnson	6 – Tied	3 – Tied	Bramlage Coliseum (11,000); Manhattan, KS
February 7, 2023; 8:00 p.m., ESPNU	No. 12	No. 17 TCU	W 82–61	19–5 (7–4)	18 – Nowell	9 – Greene	7 – Nowell	Bramlage Coliseum (8,667); Manhattan, KS
February 11, 2023; 6:00 p.m., ESPN+	No. 12	at Texas Tech	L 63–71	19–6 (7–5)	18 – Nowell	8 – Johnson	4 – Nowell	United Supermarkets Arena (12,973); Lubbock, TX
February 14, 2023; 8:00 p.m., ESPNU	No. 12	at Oklahoma	L 65–79	19–7 (7–6)	17 – Tomlin	10 – Tomlin	6 – Nowell	Lloyd Noble Center (5,167); Norman, OK
February 18, 2023; 1:00 p.m., ESPN	No. 12	No. 19 Iowa State	W 61–55	20–7 (8–6)	20 – Nowell	6 – Tied	5 – Nowell	Bramlage Coliseum (11,000); Manhattan, KS
February 21, 2023; 6:00 p.m., ESPN2	No. 14	No. 9 Baylor	W 75–65	21–7 (9–6)	25 – Johnson	8 – Tied	10 – Nowell	Bramlage Coliseum (11,000); Manhattan, KS
February 25, 2023; 6:00 p.m., ESPNU	No. 14	at Oklahoma State	W 73–68	22–7 (10–6)	22 – Nowell	5 – Tied	8 – Nowell	Gallagher-Iba Arena (11,124); Stillwater, OK
March 1, 2023; 7:00 p.m., ESPN+	No. 11	Oklahoma	W 85–69	23–7 (11–6)	19 – Tomlin	9 – Sills	10 – Nowell	Bramlage Coliseum (11,000); Manhattan, KS
March 4, 2023; 1:00 p.m., ESPN+	No. 11	at West Virginia	L 81–89	23–8 (11–7)	24 – Tied	6 – Tied	8 – Nowell	WVU Coliseum (14,111); Morgantown, WV
Big 12 tournament
March 9, 2023; 8:30 p.m., ESPN2	(3) No. 12	vs. (6) No. 22 TCU; Quarterfinals	L 67–80	23–9	14 – Tied	9 – Tomlin	5 – Nowell	T-Mobile Center (17,476); Kansas City, MO
NCAA Tournament
March 17, 2023*; 8:40 p.m., CBS	(3 E) No. 15	vs. (14 E) Montana State; First Round	W 77–65	24–9	18 – Johnson	8 – Johnson	14 – Nowell	Greensboro Coliseum (17,150); Greensboro, NC
March 19, 2023*; 1:40 p.m., CBS	(3 E) No. 15	vs. (6 E) Kentucky; Second Round	W 75–69	25–9	27 – Nowell	6 – Tomlin	9 – Nowell	Greensboro Coliseum (16,517); Greensboro, NC
March 23, 2023*; 5:30 p.m., TBS	(3 E) No. 15	vs. (7 E) Michigan State; Sweet Sixteen	W 98–93 ^{OT}	26–9	22 – Johnson	7 – Tomlin	19 – Nowell	Madison Square Garden (19,624); New York, NY
March 25, 2023*; 5:09 p.m., TBS	(3 E) No. 15	vs. (9 E) No. 25 Florida Atlantic; Elite Eight	L 76–79	26–10	30 – Nowell	6 – Tomlin	12 – Nowell	Madison Square Garden (19,680); New York, NY
*Non-conference game. ^{#}Rankings from AP Poll. (#) Tournament seedings in parentheses. E=East. All times are in Central Time.

== Rankings ==
Ranking movements Legend: ██ Increase in ranking ██ Decrease in ranking
	Week																				
Poll	Pre	1	2	3	4	5	6	7	8	9	10	11	12	13	14	15	16	17	18	19	Final
AP											11	13	5	7	12	12	14	11	12	15	Not released
Coaches											13	15	5	6	11	14	16	11	12	13	9

*No poll released
