= Highland Hills, Dallas =

Coordinates: 32.757°N 96.582°W

Highland Hills
- Country: United States
- State: Texas
- County: Dallas
- City: Dallas
- Area: Oak Cliff
- Elevation: 152 m (498 ft)
- ZIP code: 75241
- Area codes: 214, 469, 972

Highland Hills is a neighborhood in the southern sector of Dallas, Texas. The neighborhood is centered on the intersection of Bonnie View and Simpson Stuart roads. Approximately 78% of the neighborhood is African American, 18% is Hispanic, 2% is white, and 2% are multiracial.

== Education ==
The neighborhood is served by the Dallas Independent School District (DISD). The portion of the neighborhood south of Simpson Stuart Road was served by the Wilmer-Hutchins Independent School District until July 1, 2006, when the district was dissolved, and the schools absorbed into DISD. Students in the neighborhood living north of Simpson Stuart Road attend J. N. Ervin Elementary School, Sarah Zumwalt Middle School, and Wilmer-Hutchins High School. Students in the neighborhood living north of Simpson Stuart Road attend either John Neely Bryan, N. W. Harllee, William Brown Miller, or Roger Q. Mills Elementary School, Oliver Wendell Holmes Middle School and Classical Academy, and Franklin D. Roosevelt High School.

=== Libraries ===
The Highland Hills Branch Library, part of the Dallas Public Library system, is located within the neighborhood.
