= Avery Anderson III =

American basketball player (born 2000)

No. 10 – Astros de Jalisco
- Position: Point guard
- League: LNBP

Personal information
- Born: September 26, 2000 (age 26) New Orleans, Louisiana, U.S.
- Listed height: 6 ft 3 in (1.91 m)
- Listed weight: 158 lb (72 kg)

Career information
- High school: Northwest (Justin, Texas)
- College: Oklahoma State (2019–2023); TCU (2023–2024)
- NBA draft: 2024: undrafted
- Playing career: 2024–present

Career history
- 2024–2025: Randers Cimbria
- 2025–2026: Górnik Wałbrzych
- 2026–present: Astros de Jalisco

Career highlights
- Third-team All-Big 12 (2022)

Avery Anderson III (born September 26, 2000) is an American professional basketball player for Astros de Jalisco of the Liga Nacional de Baloncesto Profesional. He previously played for Randers Cimbria, the TCU Horn Frogs and Oklahoma State Cowboys.

== Early life and high school career ==
Anderson lived in New Orleans until age four, when his family evacuated due to Hurricane Katrina and moved to Alabama before settling in Texas. He attended Northwest High School in Justin, Texas. Anderson averaged 22.7 points as a senior. He left as the school's all-time leading scorer with 2,767 career points. A four-star recruit, he committed to playing college basketball for Oklahoma State over offers from TCU, Texas Tech, Florida and LSU.

== College career ==
As a freshman at Oklahoma State, Anderson averaged 4.2 points and 2.1 rebounds per game. On March 6, 2021, he scored 31 points in an 85–80 upset win over sixth-ranked West Virginia, while his teammates Cade Cunningham and Isaac Likekele were sidelined with injuries. As a sophomore, Anderson averaged 12.2 points, 4 rebounds and 2 assists per game, shooting 47.5 percent from the floor. Following the season he declared for the 2021 NBA draft, but ultimately returned to Oklahoma State. Anderson was named to the Third Team All-Big 12 as a junior. As a senior, he averaged 11.1 points, 3.5 rebounds and 3.4 assists per game in 22 games but had his season shortened with a wrist injury.

On April 22, 2023, Anderson transferred to play for the TCU Horned Frogs. He averaged 7.8 points and 3.3 assists per game as he helped the Horned Frogs to a 21-12 record and a 9 seed.

== Professional career ==
Anderson began his professional career with Randers Cimbria of the Danish league and averaged 19.9 points, 4.7 rebounds, 4.7 assists, and 2.6 steals per game. On August 9, 2025, he signed with Górnik Wałbrzych of the Polish Basketball League (PLK). In 2026, Anderson joined Astros de Jalisco of the Liga Nacional de Baloncesto Profesional.

== Career statistics ==
Legend
GP	Games played	GS	Games started	MPG	Minutes per game
FG%	Field goal percentage	3P%	3-point field goal percentage	FT%	Free throw percentage
RPG	Rebounds per game	APG	Assists per game	SPG	Steals per game
BPG	Blocks per game	PPG	Points per game	**Bold**	Career high

=== College ===
Year	Team	GP	GS	MPG	FG%	3P%	FT%	RPG	APG	SPG	BPG	PPG
2019–20	Oklahoma State	**30**	5	15.3	.364	.077	.800	2.1	1.4	1.0	**.3**	4.2
2020–21	Oklahoma State	27	**23**	**30.4**	**.475**	**.328**	**.839**	**4.0**	**2.0**	**1.5**	**.3**	**12.2**
Career		57	28	22.5	.436	.250	.828	3.0	1.7	1.2	.3	8.0
