= 2020–21 Oklahoma State Cowboys basketball team =

American college basketball season

2020–21 Oklahoma State Cowboys basketball

NCAA tournament, Second Round
- Conference: Big 12 Conference

Ranking
- Coaches: No. 19
- AP: No. 11
- Record: 21–9 (11–7 Big 12)
- Head coach: Mike Boynton (4th season)
- Assistant coaches: Scott Sutton; Erik Pastrana; Cannen Cunningham
- Home arena: Gallagher-Iba Arena

2020–21 Big 12 men's basketball standings
	Conf.				Overall
Team	W		L	PCT	W		L	PCT
No. 1 Baylor	13	–	1	.929	28	–	2	.933
No. 16 Kansas	12	–	6	.667	21	–	9	.700
No. 21 Texas †	11	–	6	.647	19	–	8	.704
No. 18 West Virginia	11	–	6	.647	19	–	10	.655
No. 19 Oklahoma State	11	–	7	.611	21	–	9	.700
No. 22 Texas Tech	9	–	8	.529	18	–	11	.621
Oklahoma	9	–	8	.529	16	–	11	.593
TCU	5	–	11	.313	12	–	14	.462
Kansas State	4	–	14	.222	9	–	20	.310
Iowa State	0	–	18	.000	2	–	22	.083
† 2021 Big 12 Tournament winner Rankings from AP poll

The 2020–21 Oklahoma State Cowboys basketball team represented Oklahoma State University during the 2020–21 NCAA Division I men's basketball season. The team was led by fourth-year head coach Mike Boynton, and played their home games at Gallagher-Iba Arena in Stillwater, Oklahoma as a member of the Big 12 Conference. They finished the season 21-9, 11-7 in Big 12 Play to finish in 5th place. They defeated West Virginia and Baylor to advance to the championship game of the Big 12 tournament where they lost to Texas. They received an at-large bid to the NCAA tournament where they defeated Liberty in the First Round before getting upset in the Second Round by Oregon State.

== Previous season ==
The Cowboys finished the 2019–20 season 18–14, 7–11 in Big 12 play to finish in eighth place. They defeated Iowa State in the first round of the Big 12 tournament before all remaining games were canceled due to the COVID-19 pandemic.

== Departures ==
Name	Number	Pos.	Height	Weight	Year	Hometown	Reason for departure
Jonathan Laurent	1	G/F	6'6"	215	Senior	Orlando, FL	Graduated
Thomas Dziagwa	4	G	6'4"	190	Senior	Temple Terrace, FL	Graduated
Marcus Watson	5	G	6'6"	215	Freshman	Buford, GA	Transferred to New Mexico State
Cameron McGriff	12	F	6'7"	230	Senior	Grand Prairie, TX	Graduated
Yor Anei	14	F	6'10"	235	Sophomore	Overland Park, KS	Transferred to SMU
Lindy Waters III	21	G	6'6"	215	Senior	Norman, OK	Graduated
Trey Reeves	33	F	6'4"	220	Senior	Gans, OK	Graduated
Hidde Roessink	35	F	6'10"	220	Freshman	Arnhem, Netherlands	Transferred to Kansas City
J. K. Hadlock	54	G	6'1"	185	Senior	Fairfax, OK	Graduated

=== Incoming transfers ===
Name	Number	Pos.	Height	Weight	Year	Hometown	Previous school
Bryce Williams	14	G	6'2"	180	Senior	Tampa, FL	Ole Miss
Bernard Kouma	25	F	6'10"	240	Sophomore	N'Djamena, Chad	South Plains CC
Ferron Flavors Jr.	31	G	6'3"	190	Graduate Student	Federal Way, WA	California Baptist

== Recruits ==
College recruiting information
Name	Hometown	School	Height	Weight	Commit date
Cade Cunningham #2 CG	Arlington, Texas	Montverde Academy	6 ft 8 in (2.03 m)	220 lb (100 kg)	Nov 5, 2019
Cade Cunningham #2 CG	Recruit ratings: Rivals: 247Sports: ESPN: (97)				
Donovan Williams #4 CG	Lincoln, Nebraska	North Star HS	6 ft 5 in (1.96 m)	200 lb (91 kg)	Apr 13, 2020
Donovan Williams #4 CG	Recruit ratings: Rivals: 247Sports: ESPN: (81)				
Rondel Walker #5 SG	Midwest City, OK	Putnam City West High School	6 ft 4 in (1.93 m)	170 lb (77 kg)	Oct 31, 2019
Rondel Walker #5 SG	Recruit ratings: Rivals: 247Sports: ESPN: (85)				
Matthew-Alexander Moncrieffe #12 SF	Brampton, Ontario, Canada	Orangeville Prep	6 ft 7 in (2.01 m)	215 lb (98 kg)	Feb 21, 2020
Matthew-Alexander Moncrieffe #12 SF	Recruit ratings: Rivals: 247Sports: ESPN: (80)				
Montreal Pena Jr. #21 PF	Arlington, Texas	Martin High School	6 ft 10 in (2.08 m)	190 lb (86 kg)	Nov 21, 2019
Montreal Pena Jr. #21 PF	Recruit ratings: Rivals: 247Sports: ESPN: (78)				
Overall recruit ranking:
Note: In many cases, Scout, Rivals, 247Sports, On3, and ESPN may conflict in their listings of height and weight.; In these cases, the average was taken. ESPN grades are on a 100-point scale.; Sources: "2020 Team Ranking". Rivals.

== Roster ==
2020–21 Oklahoma State Cowboys men's basketball team
Players
Coaches

Pos.	#	Name	Height	Weight	Year	Previous school	Hometown
G	0	Avery Anderson III	6 ft 3 in (1.91 m)	170 lb (77 kg)	So	Northwest HS	Justin, TX
G	1	Chris Harris Jr.	6 ft 2 in (1.88 m)	200 lb (91 kg)	So	South Garland HS	Dallas, TX
G	2	Cade Cunningham	6 ft 8 in (2.03 m)	220 lb (100 kg)	Fr	Montverde Academy	Arlington, TX
G	4	Donovan Williams	6 ft 5 in (1.96 m)	200 lb (91 kg)	Fr	North Star HS	Lincoln, NE
G	5	Rondel Walker	6 ft 4 in (1.93 m)	170 lb (77 kg)	Fr	Putnam City West HS	Midwest City, OK
F	12	Matthew-Alexander Moncrieffe	6 ft 7 in (2.01 m)	215 lb (98 kg)	Fr	Orangeville Prep	Brampton, Ontario, Canada
G	13	Isaac Likekele	6 ft 5 in (1.96 m)	215 lb (98 kg)	Jr	Mansfield Timberview HS	Arlington, TX
G	14	Bryce Williams	6 ft 2 in (1.88 m)	180 lb (82 kg)	Sr	Ole Miss	Tampa, FL
G	15	Carson Sager (W)	6 ft 4 in (1.93 m)	207 lb (94 kg)	Fr	Rider HS	Wichita Falls, TX
G/F	20	Keylan Boone	6 ft 8 in (2.03 m)	200 lb (91 kg)	So	Tulsa Memorial HS	Tulsa, OK
F	21	Montreal Pena Jr.	6 ft 10 in (2.08 m)	190 lb (86 kg)	Fr	Martin HS	Arlington, TX
F	22	Kalib Boone	6 ft 9 in (2.06 m)	210 lb (95 kg)	So	Tulsa Memorial HS	Tulsa, OK
F	25	Bernard Kouma	6 ft 10 in (2.08 m)	240 lb (109 kg)	So	South Plains CC	N'Djamena, Chad
G	31	Ferron Flavors Jr.	6 ft 3 in (1.91 m)	190 lb (86 kg)	GS	California Baptist	Federal Way, WA
G	35	Weston Church (W)	6 ft 3 in (1.91 m)	180 lb (82 kg)	Fr	Fairview HS	Fairview, OK
F	42	Mason Robbins (W)	6 ft 9 in (2.06 m)	220 lb (100 kg)	Fr	Oklahoma Christian	Edmond, OK
G	55	Dee Mitchell (W)	6 ft 2 in (1.88 m)	190 lb (86 kg)	Jr	Jefferson	Jefferson, TX

Head coach

- Mike Boynton, Jr. (South Carolina)

Assistant coach(es)

- Scott Sutton (Oklahoma State)
- Erik Pastrana (Florida State)
- Cannen Cunningham (SMU)

Legend

- (C) Team captain
- (S) Suspended
- (I) Ineligible
- (W) Walk-on
- Injured
- Current redshirt

Roster

== Schedule and results ==
Date time, TV	Rank^{#}	Opponent^{#}	Result	Record	High points	High rebounds	High assists	Site (attendance) city, state
Regular Season
November 25, 2020*; 3:00 p.m., ESPN		at UT Arlington	W 75–68	1–0	21 – Cunningham	13 – Likekele	7 – Likekele	College Park Center (624); Arlington, TX
November 28, 2020*; 6:30 p.m., ESPN+		Texas Southern	W 85–65	2–0	20 – Cunningham	6 – Likekele	4 – Tied	Gallagher-Iba Arena (3,350); Stillwater, OK
December 1, 2020*; 6:00 p.m., FS1		at Marquette	W 70–62	3–0	16 – Walker	6 – Tied	4 – Williams	Fiserv Forum (0); Milwaukee, WI
December 5, 2020*; 6:30 p.m., ESPN+		Oakland	W 84–71	4–0	18 – Cunningham	7 – Tied	8 – Cunningham	Gallagher-Iba Arena (3,350); Stillwater, OK
December 8, 2020*; 7:00 p.m., ESPN+		Oral Roberts	W 83–78	5–0	29 – Cunningham	12 – Boone	3 – Cunningham	Gallagher-Iba Arena (3,350); Stillwater, OK
December 12, 2020*; 2:00 p.m., ESPN+		at Wichita State	W 67–64	6–0	14 – Likekele	8 – Likekele	3 – Tied	Charles Koch Arena (625); Wichita, KS
December 16, 2020; 6:00 p.m., ESPN		TCU	L 76–77	6–1 (0–1)	17 – Cunningham	9 – Likekele	6 – Likekele	Gallagher-Iba Arena (3,350); Stillwater, OK
December 20, 2020; 1:00 p.m., LHN		at No. 11 Texas	L 74–77	6–2 (0–2)	25 – Cunningham	9 – Likekele	3 – Cunningham	Frank Erwin Center (2,428); Austin, TX
January 2, 2021; 3:00 p.m., ESPN+		at No. 13 Texas Tech	W 82–77 ^{OT}	7–2 (1–2)	25 – Cunningham	9 – Likekele	3 – Cunningham	United Supermarkets Arena (4,013); Lubbock, TX
January 4, 2021; 8:00 p.m., ESPN2		No. 14 West Virginia	L 84–87	7–3 (1–3)	25 – Cunningham	9 – Cunningham	4 – Tied	Gallagher-Iba Arena (3,350); Stillwater, OK
January 9, 2021; 5:00 p.m., ESPN2		at Kansas State	W 70–54	8–3 (2–3)	15 – Tied	9 – Likekele	5 – Cunningham	Bramlage Coliseum (965); Manhattan, KS
January 12, 2021; 7:00 p.m., ESPN+		No. 6 Kansas	W 75–70	9–3 (3–3)	17 – Williams	10 – Walker	6 – Likekele	Gallagher-Iba Arena (3,350); Stillwater, OK
January 16, 2021; 7:00 p.m., ESPN2		Oklahoma	Postponed due to COVID-19 issues					Gallagher-Iba Arena; Stillwater, OK
January 19, 2021; 6:00 p.m., ESPN/ESPN2		at No. 14 West Virginia	Postponed due to COVID-19 issues					WVU Coliseum; Morgantown, WV
January 23, 2021; 1:00 p.m., CBS		No. 2 Baylor	L 66–81	9–4 (3–4)	21 – Ka. Boone	10 – Moncrieffe	7 – Likekele	Gallagher-Iba Arena (3,350); Stillwater, OK
January 25, 2021; 8:00 p.m., ESPN2		at Iowa State	W 81–60	10–4 (4–4)	22 – Moncrieffe	12 – Moncrieffe	5 – Anderson III	Hilton Coliseum (1,019); Ames, IA
January 30, 2021*; 3:00 p.m., ESPN2		Arkansas; Big 12/SEC Challenge	W 81–77	11–4	21 – Cunningham	12 – Ka. Boone	5 – Tied	Gallagher-Iba Arena (3,350); Stillwater, OK
February 3, 2021; 8:00 p.m., ESPN2		at TCU	L 78–81	11–5 (4–5)	19 – Cunningham	10 – Moncrieffe	6 – Williams	Schollmaier Arena (2,481); Fort Worth, TX
February 6, 2021; 2:00 p.m., ABC		No. 6 Texas	W 75–67 ^{2OT}	12–5 (5–5)	22 – Ka. Boone	15 – Ka. Boone	2 – Cunningham	Gallagher-Iba Arena (3,350); Stillwater, OK
February 8, 2021; 8:00 p.m., ESPN	No. 23	at Kansas	L 66–78	12–6 (5–6)	26 – Cunningham	9 – Cunningham	4 – Likekele	Allen Fieldhouse (2,500); Lawrence, KS
February 13, 2021; 11:00 a.m., ESPNU	No. 23	Kansas State	W 67–60	13–6 (6–6)	15 – Cunningham	9 – Ka. Boone	5 – Cunningham	Gallagher-Iba Arena (3,350); Stillwater, OK
February 16, 2021; 3:00 p.m., ESPN+		Iowa State	W 76–58	14–6 (7–6)	21 – Cunningham	9 – Moncrieffe	7 – Cunningham	Gallagher-Iba Arena (3,350); Stillwater, OK
February 20, 2021; 3:00 p.m., ESPN/ESPN2		at No. 2 Baylor	Postponed					Ferrell Center; Waco, TX
February 22, 2021; 8:00 p.m., ESPN		No. 18 Texas Tech	W 74–69 ^{OT}	15–6 (8–6)	20 – Cunningham	7 – Ka. Boone	3 – Likekele	Gallagher-Iba Arena (3,350); Stillwater, OK
February 27, 2021; 2:00 p.m., ABC		at No. 7 Oklahoma	W 94–90 ^{OT}	16–6 (9–6)	40 – Cunningham	12 – Moncrieffe	3 – Tied	Lloyd Noble Center (2,929); Norman, OK
March 1, 2021; 8:00 p.m., ESPN	No. 17	No. 16 Oklahoma	W 79–75	17–6 (10–6)	17 – Ka. Boone	9 – Ka. Boone	4 – Cunningham	Gallagher-Iba Arena (3,350); Stillwater, OK
March 4, 2021; 6:00 p.m., ESPN2	No. 17	at No. 3 Baylor	L 70–81	17–7 (10–7)	24 – Cunningham	7 – Cunningham	4 – Tied	Ferrell Center (2,350); Waco, TX
March 6, 2021; 1:00 p.m., ESPN2	No. 17	at No. 6 West Virginia	W 85–80	18–7 (11–7)	31 – Anderson III	10 – Kouma	6 – Williams	WVU Coliseum (2,800); Morgantown, WV
Big 12 Tournament
March 11, 2021; 10:30 a.m., ESPN	(5) No. 12	vs. (4) No. 10 West Virginia; Quarterfinals	W 72–69	19–7	17 – Tied	10 – Ka. Boone	4 – Cunningham	T-Mobile Center (3,491); Kansas City, MO
March 12, 2021; 5:30 p.m., ESPN	(5) No. 12	vs. (1) No. 2 Baylor; Semifinals	W 83–74	20–7	25 – Cunningham	8 – Cunningham	5 – Cunningham	T-Mobile Center (3,298); Kansas City, MO
March 13, 2021; 5:00 p.m., ESPN	(5) No. 12	vs. (3) No. 13 Texas; Championship	L 86–91	20–8	29 – Cunningham	7 – Moncrieffe	6 – Likekele	T-Mobile Center (3,525); Kansas City, MO
NCAA tournament
March 19, 2021; 5:25 p.m., TBS	(4 MW) No. 11	vs. (13 MW) Liberty; First Round	W 69–60	21–8	19 – Anderson III	9 – Moncrieffe	4 – Likekele	Indiana Farmers Coliseum (972); Indianapolis, IN
March 21, 2021; 8:40 p.m., TBS	(4 MW) No. 11	vs. (12 MW) Oregon State; Second Round	L 70–80	21–9	24 – Cunningham	8 – Ke. Boone	4 – Anderson III	Hinkle Fieldhouse (1,038); Indianapolis, IN
*Non-conference game. ^{#}Rankings from AP Poll. (#) Tournament seedings in parentheses. All times are in Central Time.
