= Jared Retkofsky =

American football player (born 1983)

No. 61
- Position: Long snapper

Personal information
- Born: March 16, 1983 (age 43); Wichita, Kansas, U.S.
- Listed height: 6 ft 5 in (1.96 m)
- Listed weight: 260 lb (118 kg)

Career information
- High school: Northwest (Justin, Texas)
- College: Texas Christian
- NFL draft: 2007: undrafted

Career history
- Pittsburgh Steelers (2007)*; Seattle Seahawks (2007)*; Pittsburgh Steelers (2008); New York Sentinels (2009); Pittsburgh Steelers (2009); Hartford Colonials (2010); Central Texas Wolf Pack (2015)
- * Offseason or practice squad member only

Awards and highlights
- Super Bowl champion (XLIII)

Career NFL statistics
- Games played: 11
- Total tackles: 2
- Stats at Pro Football Reference

Jared Michael Retkofsky (born March 16, 1983) is an American former professional football player who was a long snapper in the National Football League (NFL). He played college football for the TCU Horned Frogs and was signed by the Pittsburgh Steelers as an undrafted free agent in 2007.

Retkofsky earned a Super Bowl ring with the Steelers in Super Bowl XLIII. He was also a member of the Seattle Seahawks, as well as the New York Sentinels and Hartford Colonials of the United Football League (UFL).

== Professional career ==
As a free agent during the 2008 regular season, Retkofsky worked as a furniture mover.

He was re-signed by the Steelers on October 28 after long snapper Greg Warren was placed on season-ending injured reserve. Retkofsky served as the Steelers' long snapper through the rest of the regular season and playoffs as the Steelers won Super Bowl XLIII that year. Retkofsky was waived by the Steelers on April 30, after suffering a broken shoulder from a non-football related incident.

He then played for the New York Sentinels of the United Football League. Following the completion of the inaugural UFL season, Retkofsky returned to working for a moving company before being signed again by the Steelers.

Retkofsky re-signed with the Pittsburgh Steelers on December 21, 2009, replacing Greg Warren for the second straight season due to a torn ACL.

In 2015, he played for the Central Texas Wolf Pack of the National Public Safety Football League.
