= Mark Followill =

American sports announcer

- Born: Mark Duane Followill
- Occupation: Sportscaster
- Sports commentary career
- Genre: Play-by-play
- Sports: ACC; MLS; NBA

Mark Duane Followill is an American sports announcer, covering basketball, soccer and football. He is currently the voice of the NBA's Dallas Mavericks on MavsTV (aired on WFAA/KFAA-TV) and secondary play-by-play announcer for NBA on NBC on NBC Sports along with Mike Tirico, Noah Eagle, Terry Gannon,Michael Grady, and Jason Benetti.

== Career ==
Early in his career, Followill worked in various positions at KTCK The Ticket in Dallas including as host of The Ender. He still makes regular contributions to the station. He also had a stint at KTOK in Oklahoma City.

=== Basketball ===
Followill is the television play-by-play voice for the Dallas Mavericks, a position he's held since 2005. He and analyst Derek Harper won a Lone Star Emmy award in 2014 for their work on Mavericks broadcasts. Followill had previously been the radio play-by-play voice for the Mavericks on 103.3 ESPN Radio from 2001 to 2005. He won the Katie Award for Best Play-by-Play Sportscast in 2002 and the Texas Associated Press Award for Best Play-by-Play Broadcast in 2004 and 2005.

=== Soccer ===
Followill was previously the television play-by-play announcer for FC Dallas. In 2012, he began calling FCD games except when they conflicted with his responsibilities with the Mavericks. His work with FC Dallas gained the attention of Fox Sports, who named him as one of their announcers for Copa America Centenario. Later that summer, he was named as one of the announcers for NBC's coverage of soccer at the 2016 Summer Olympics. He returned to NBC for the Olympics in 2020 and 2024. In 2017, Fox named him part of their team covering that year's CONCACAF Gold Cup. He has also called UEFA Europa League, Bundesliga, MLS, FIFA U-17 World Cup, and FIFA U-20 World Cup action for Fox. He was also an announcer for the 2018 FIFA World Cup. After all MLS television broadcasts moved to Apple TV+, Followill joined the broadcasting team for MLS Season Pass in 2023.

=== Football ===
Followill also announces play-by-play action for college football telecasts for Fox Sports and Big Ten Network. Earlier in his career, he was the play-by-play announcer for the SMU football team. He called the Atlanta Falcons-Tampa Bay Buccaneers NFL game for Fox on November 1, 2026, in place of Kevin Kugler, who had been assigned to college basketball in Rome that weekend.

== Personal life ==
Followill is a native of the Dallas–Fort Worth metroplex. He graduated from Northwest High School in Justin, Texas. He attended the University of North Texas but left to pursue his broadcasting career. In 2020, three years after resuming course work, he graduated from North Texas with a Bachelor of Applied Arts and Sciences degree.
