= Tyler Collins (baseball) =

American baseball player (born 1990)

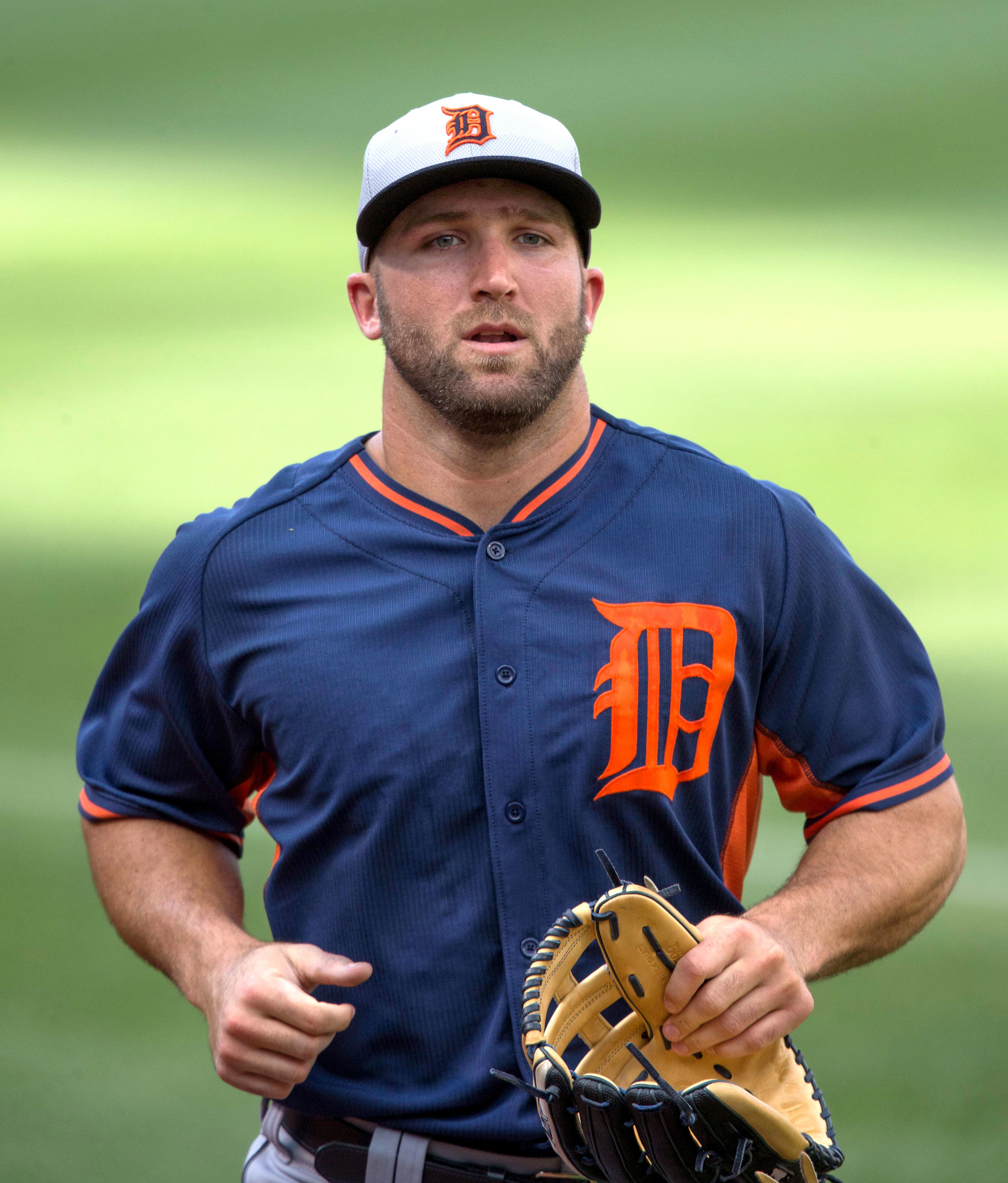
- Collins with the Detroit Tigers
- Outfielder
- Born: June 6, 1990 (age 35); Lubbock, Texas, U.S.
- Batted: Left Threw: Left

MLB debut
- March 31, 2014, for the Detroit Tigers

Last MLB appearance
- September 22, 2017, for the Detroit Tigers

Career statistics
- Batting average: .235
- Home runs: 14
- Runs batted in: 58
- Stats at Baseball Reference

Teams
- Detroit Tigers (2014–2017)

Tyler James Collins (born June 6, 1990) is an American former professional baseball outfielder. He played in Major League Baseball (MLB) for the Detroit Tigers from 2014 to 2017.

== Amateur career ==
Collins graduated from Northwest High School in Justin, Texas. He began his college baseball career at Baylor University, playing for the Baylor Bears baseball team. After his freshman year, he transferred to Howard College, where he played for the Howard Hawks. He was named the 2011 National Junior College Athletic Association Division I Baseball Player of the Year award, after he led the NJCAA Division I with 19 home runs and finished second with a .488 batting average and 82 runs batted in (RBIs).

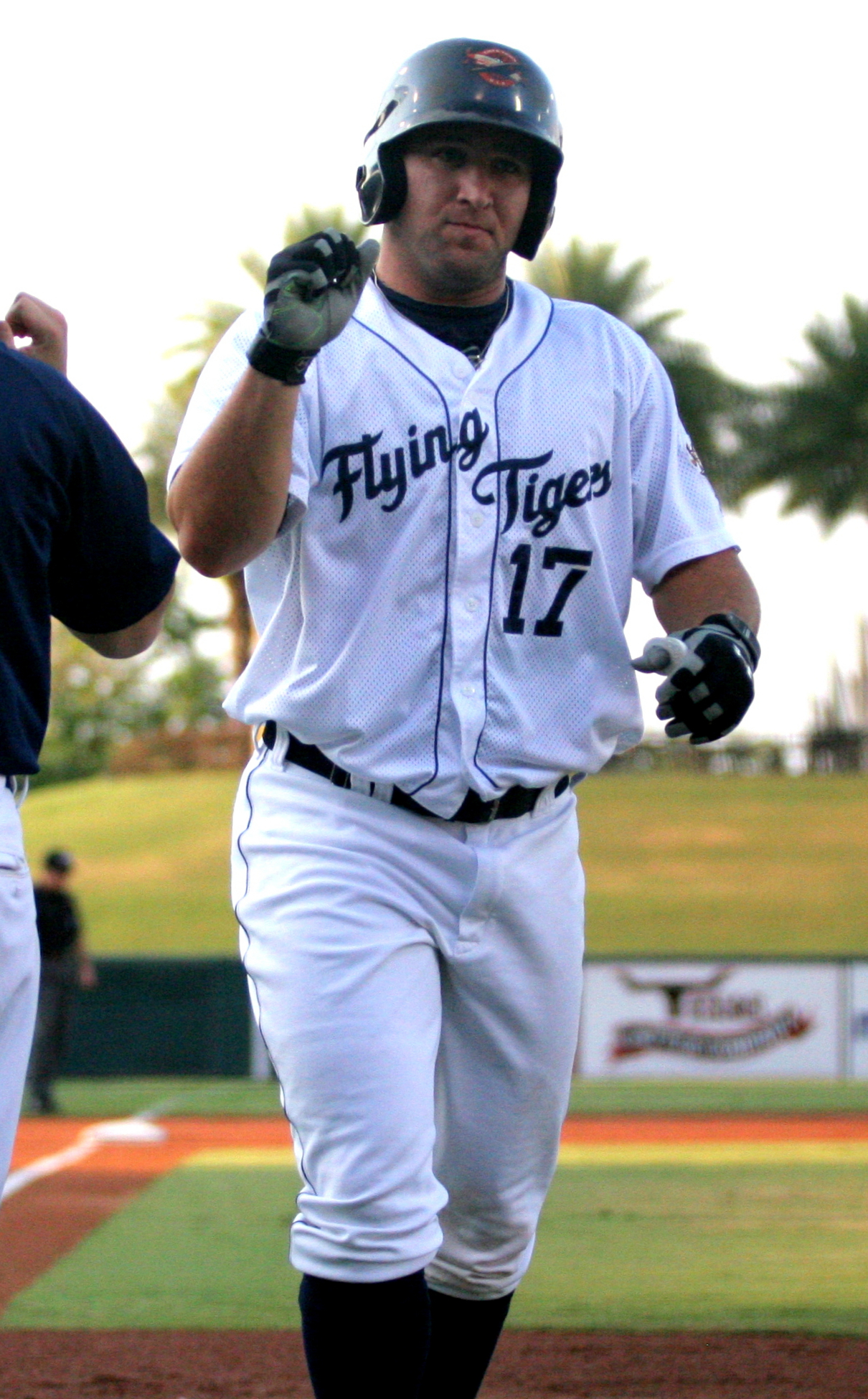
Collins with the Lakeland Flying Tigers in 2012

Following the 2011 season, Collins committed to transfer to Texas Christian University (TCU) to play for the TCU Horned Frogs.

== Professional career ==
=== Detroit Tigers ===
Collins was drafted by the Detroit Tigers in the sixth round of the 2011 MLB draft. Collins signed with the Tigers, rather than transfer to TCU. Following the regular season, he played for the Sydney Blue Sox of the Australian Baseball League, and was named to the 2011 Australian Baseball League All-Star Game where he earned the game's most valuable player award. After the 2013 season, the Tigers assigned Collins to the Arizona Fall League.

=== 2014 season ===
On March 29, 2014, the Detroit Tigers purchased Collins' contract from Double-A Erie, and added him to the 25-man roster. The Tigers intended for Collins to serve as a backup and platoon partner with Rajai Davis. He made his Major League debut March 31, as a pinch runner for Alex Avila in the bottom of the ninth and scored the winning run to end the game. After batting 2-for-14 in sporadic playing time, the Tigers optioned Collins to the Toledo Mud Hens of the Triple-A International League on April 18. On September 1, Collins was called up by the Tigers. Following being called up, Collins entered the game as a pinch hitter in the 9th inning of a game against the Cleveland Indians, where he hit his first career home run.

=== 2015 season ===
Collins saw more extensive major league playing time in 2015 after the Tigers traded away outfielder Yoenis Céspedes in late July. In 60 games, Collins hit .266 with four home runs and 25 RBIs.

=== 2016 season ===
On April 25, 2016, during a home game against the Oakland Athletics, Collins gave the Detroit crowd the finger after he lost a flyball in the lights and the home crowd began booing him. This play allowed Marcus Semien to advance to third base and put Jordan Zimmermann's scoreless streak on the line. Collins apologized after the game, saying that he was "embarrassed in himself" by his behavior. He was not suspended, but was optioned to the Toledo Mud Hens on April 27. Collins returned to Detroit on July 15 after Justin Upton was placed on the bereavement list. He remained with the Tigers following the return of Upton, as the team chose to option Steven Moya to Triple-A instead. He would finish 2016 with a .235 batting average and 4 home runs in 56 games.

=== 2017 season ===
On April 6, 2017, Collins hit his first home run of the season, a solo blast in the second inning against the Chicago White Sox. On May 17, Collins had the first multiple home run game of his career, slamming two homers in his first two at-bats against the Baltimore Orioles. He batted .200 on the season through May 28, including 5-for-61 (.082) in his last 20 games, and was designated for assignment.

Collins cleared waivers and returned to Toledo. Through the end of their regular season, he batted .288 with nine home runs and 46 RBIs in 74 games. Seven days later, on September 10, the Tigers promoted him to the major leagues. He was outrighted to Triple–A on November 2. Collins elected free agency on November 6.

=== Kansas City Royals (2018) ===
On January 17, 2018, Collins signed a minor league contract with the Kansas City Royals. After hitting .132 in 18 games with the Omaha Storm Chasers of the Pacific Coast League, Collins was released by the Royals on April 27.
