= Cooper McDonald =

American football player (born 2001)

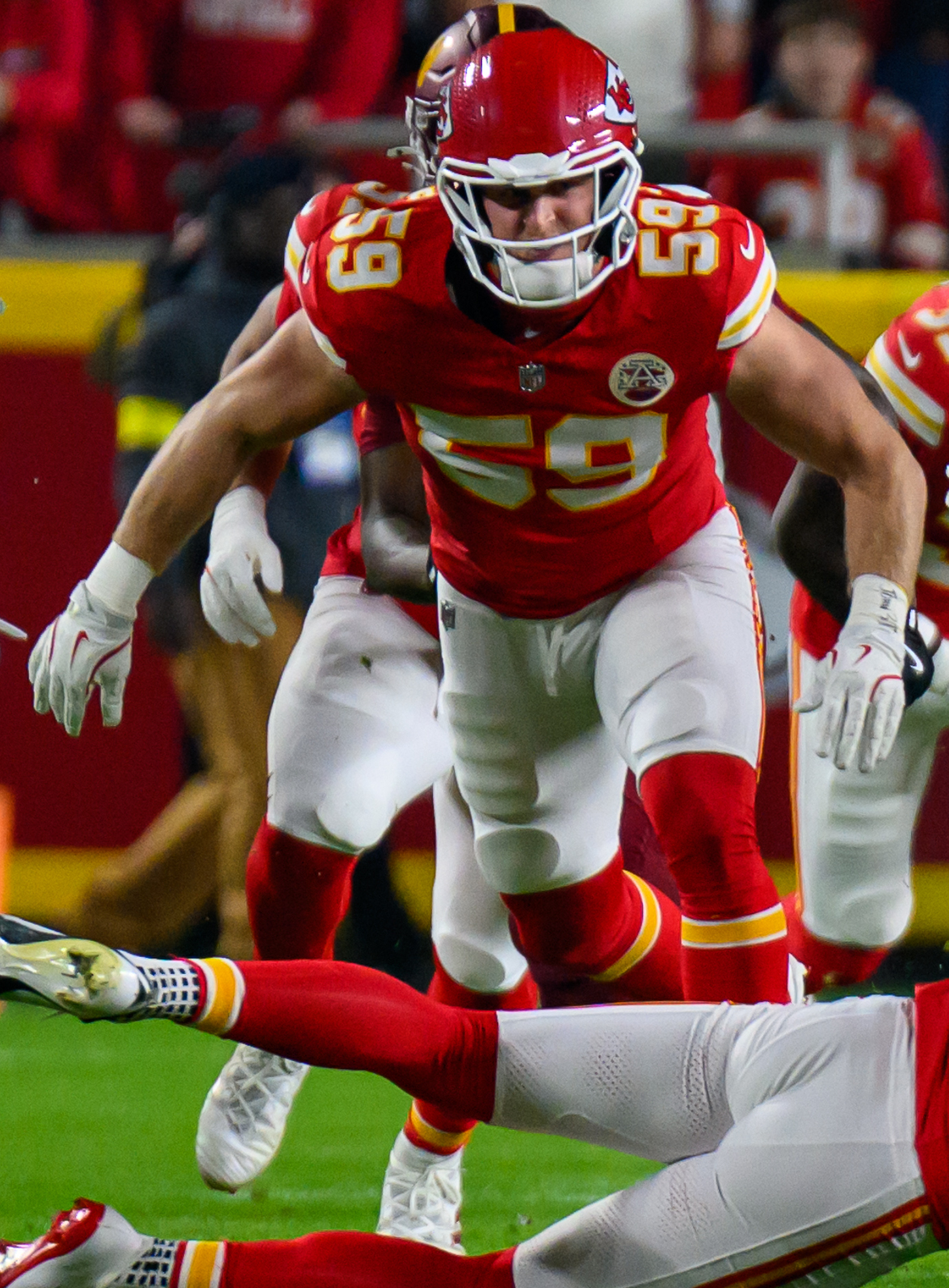
- McDonald with the Kansas City Chiefs in 2025

No. 44 – Kansas City Chiefs
- Position: Linebacker
- Roster status: Active

Personal information
- Born: August 7, 2001 (age 25); Dallas, Texas, U.S.
- Listed height: 6 ft 3 in (1.91 m)
- Listed weight: 240 lb (109 kg)

Career information
- High school: Northwest (Justin, Texas)
- College: Washington (2020–2021); San Diego State (2022–2023); TCU (2024)
- NFL draft: 2025: undrafted

Career history
- Kansas City Chiefs (2025–present)

Career NFL statistics as of 2025
- Total tackles: 25
- Stats at Pro Football Reference

Cooper McDonald (born August 7, 2001) is an American professional football linebacker for the Kansas City Chiefs of the National Football League (NFL). He played college football for the Washington Huskies, San Diego State Aztecs and TCU Horned Frogs and was signed by the Chiefs as an undrafted free agent in 2025.

== Early life ==
McDonald is from Haslet, Texas. He attended Northwest High School in Justin and competed in football and track and field there. As a junior in football, he had four forced fumbles and two interceptions. He then was named honorable mention all-state and the District 4-5A Division II Defensive MVP as a senior. A three-star recruit, he committed to play college football for the Washington Huskies.

== College career ==
As a freshman at Washington in 2020, McDonald appeared in four games and totaled four tackles and a pass breakup. He then became a starter at linebacker in 2021 after an injury to Zion Tupuola-Fetui. In 10 starts during the 2021 season, he made 25 tackles and one sack. After the season, he entered the NCAA transfer portal. McDonald transferred to the San Diego State Aztecs in 2022, posting 41 tackles, five tackles-for-loss and two sacks that year. In 2023, he started all 12 games and tallied 43 tackles, four tackles-for-loss and 1.5 sacks. He then transferred to the TCU Horned Frogs for his final year of college football in 2024. With the Horned Frogs, he posted 25 tackles, four tackles-for-loss and three sacks in nine games played.

== Professional career ==
Pre-draft measurables
| Height | Weight | Arm length | Hand span | Wingspan | 40-yard dash | 10-yard split | 20-yard split | 20-yard shuttle | Three-cone drill | Vertical jump | Broad jump | Bench press |
|---|---|---|---|---|---|---|---|---|---|---|---|---|
| 6 ft 2 1/4 in (1.89 m) | 235 lb (107 kg) | 31 3/8 in (0.80 m) | 9 7/8 in (0.25 m) | 6 ft 3 3/8 in (1.91 m) | 4.66 s | 1.55 s | 2.71 s | 4.60 s | 7.19 s | 33.0 in (0.84 m) | 9 ft 1 in (2.77 m) | 21 reps |
All values from Pro Day

After going unselected in the 2025 NFL draft, McDonald signed with the Kansas City Chiefs as an undrafted free agent, following a successful rookie minicamp tryout. He appeared in all 17 games (starting one) for the Chiefs during his rookie season, recording 25 combined tackles.

On September 16, 2026, McDonald was placed on injured reserve due to a knee injury suffered in the team's season–opening victory over the Denver Broncos.
