= Texas's 65th House of Representatives district =

American legislative district

Texas's 65th State House of Representatives district
Representative
| Mitch Little; R–Carrollton |
- Demographics: 51.6% White; 13.3% Black; 19.0% Hispanic; 14.4% Asian
- Population (2020) • Voting age: 202,249; 154,144

District 65 is a district of the Texas House of Representatives that serves a portion of Denton County.

The current representative is Mitch Little who was elected in 2024. He defeated Kronda Thimesch, who was elected in 2022 in a primary election. Previous incumbent Democrat Michelle Beckley, while joining a caucus of Texas House Democrats in Washington DC to break quorum, announced she would instead challenge US Representative Beth Van Duyne in 2022.

== District description ==
The district is located wholly within Denton County, representing southern portions of the county. The district includes northeastern parts of Lewisville, northern half of Carrollton, southern half of The Colony, all of Bartonville, Northlake, Justin, and Double Oak, as well as portions of Plano, Highland Village, Roanoke and small portions of Dallas and Fort Worth that extend into Denton County.

== History of district ==
From 1920 to 1951, District 65 was a floterial district covering Burleson, Lee and Milam counties.

From 2012 to 2022, the district represented portions of southern Denton County, primarily parts of Lewisville and Carrollton.

Texas House District 65 vote by party in recent elections
| Year | Democratic | Republican | Other |
|---|---|---|---|
| 2022 | 40.21% 28,878 | 59.79% 42,934 | - |
| 2020 | 51.51% 40,529 | 48.49% 38,156 | - |
| 2018 | 51.16% 29,972 | 48.84% 28,614 | - |
| 2016 | 43.74% 26,759 | 56.26% 34,418 | - |
| 2014 | 35.69% 10,440 | 64.31% 18,812 | - |
| 2012 | 38.58% 20,481 | 59.12% 31,386 | 2.31% 1,224 |

== Representatives ==
| Leg. | Representative | Party | Term start | Term end | Counties represented |
|---|---|---|---|---|---|
| 5th | Benjamin Franklin Neal | Unknown | December 27, 1853 | November 5, 1855 | Nueces, Refugio, San Patricio |
| 6th | Jerome B. McCown | Unknown | November 5, 1855 | November 2, 1857 | Nueces, Refugio, San Patricio |
| 7th | Somers Kinney | Unknown | November 5, 1857 | November 7, 1859 | Nueces, Refugio, San Patricio |
| 8th | Henry Kinney | Unknown | November 7, 1859 | February 9, 1861 | Nueces, Refugio, San Patricio |
| 8th | Alfred Marmaduke Hobby | Unknown | March 19, 1861 | November 4, 1861 | Nueces, Refugio, San Patricio |
| 9th | Washington Edmund Goodrich | Unknown | November 4, 1861 | November 2, 1863 | Guadalupe |
| 10th | Henry Maney | Unknown | November 6, 1863 | August 6, 1866 | Guadalupe |
| 11th | Middleton S. Dunn | Unknown | August 6, 1866 | February 7, 1870 | Guadalupe |
| 15th | John T. Haynes | Republican | April 18, 1876 | January 14, 1879 | Travis |
| 16th | Felix Ezell Smith | Democratic | January 14, 1879 | January 11, 1881 | Travis |
| 17th | Fred Carleton | Democratic | January 11, 1881 | January 9, 1883 | Travis |
| 18th | Henry Jacob Labatt | Democratic | January 9, 1883 | January 13, 1885 | Galveston |
| 19th | Lorenzo Clarke Fisher | Democratic | January 13, 1885 | January 11, 1887 | Galveston |
| 20th | Walter Gresham | Democratic | January 11, 1887 | January 8, 1889 | Galveston |
| 21st | Walter Gresham | Democratic | January 8, 1889 | January 13, 1891 | Galveston |
| 22nd | Miles Crowley | Democratic | January 13, 1891 | January 10, 1893 | Galveston |
| 23rd | Spencer Young | Democratic | January 10, 1893 | January 8, 1895 | Bell |
| 23rd | Shelby N. Strange | Democratic | January 10, 1893 | January 8, 1895 | Bell |
| 24th | Shelby N. Strange | Democratic | January 8, 1895 | January 12, 1897 | Bell |
| 24th | Daniel Edwin Patterson | Democratic | January 8, 1895 | January 12, 1897 | Bell |
| 25th | Daniel Edwin Patterson | Democratic | January 12, 1897 | January 10, 1899 | Bell |
| 25th | L. M. Benson | Democratic | January 12, 1897 | January 10, 1899 | Bell |
| 26th | Huling Parker Robertson | Democratic | January 10, 1899 | January 8, 1901 | Bell |
| 26th | William Tecumseh Shannon | Democratic | January 10, 1899 | January 8, 1901 | Bell |
| 27th | William Tecumseh Shannon | Democratic | January 8, 1901 | January 13, 1903 | Bell |
| 27th | William Attress Craddock | Democratic | January 8, 1901 | January 13, 1903 | Bell |
| 28th | John Emery Crawford | Democratic | January 13, 1903 | September 12, 1903 | Robertson |
| 29th | William T. Bartholomew | Democratic | January 10, 1905 | January 8, 1907 | Robertson |
| 30th | Jacob Leonard Goodman | Democratic | January 8, 1907 | January 12, 1909 | Robertson |
| 31st | Jacob Leonard Goodman | Democratic | January 12, 1909 | January 10, 1911 | Robertson |
| 32nd | Daniel F. Parker | Democratic | January 10, 1911 | January 14, 1913 | Robertson |
| 33rd | Randolph Roy Tyson | Democratic | January 14, 1913 | January 12, 1915 | Milam |
| 34th | Campbell McCleary Beard | Democratic | January 12, 1915 | January 9, 1917 | Milam |
| 35th | Campbell McCleary Beard | Democratic | January 9, 1917 | January 14, 1919 | Milam |
| 36th | Campbell McCleary Beard | Democratic | January 14, 1919 | January 11, 1921 | Milam |
| 37th | Isaac W. "Ike" Looney | Democratic | January 11, 1921 | January 9, 1923 | Milam |
| 38th | Oscar Dudley Baker | Democratic | January 9, 1923 | January 13, 1925 | Burleson, Lee, Milam |
| 39th | Ed R. Sinks | Democratic | January 13, 1925 | January 11, 1927 | Burleson, Lee, Milam |
| 40th | Ed R. Sinks | Democratic | January 11, 1927 | January 8, 1929 | Burleson, Lee, Milam |
| 41st | Ed R. Sinks | Democratic | January 8, 1929 | January 13, 1931 | Burleson, Lee, Milam |
| 42nd | James Joseph Elliott | Democratic | January 13, 1931 | January 10, 1933 | Burleson, Lee, Milam |
| 43rd | Jesse James | Democratic | January 10, 1933 | January 8, 1935 | Burleson, Lee, Milam |
| 44th | Jesse James | Democratic | January 8, 1935 | January 12, 1937 | Burleson, Lee, Milam |
| 45th | Jesse James | Democratic | January 12, 1937 | September 1, 1937 | Burleson, Lee, Milam |
| 45th | Henry Grady "Bud" Lehman | Democratic | September 27, 1937 | January 10, 1939 | Burleson, Lee, Milam |
| 46th | Henry Grady "Bud" Lehman | Democratic | January 10, 1939 | January 14, 1941 | Burleson, Lee, Milam |
| 47th | Henry Grady "Bud" Lehman | Democratic | January 14, 1941 | January 12, 1943 | Burleson, Lee, Milam |
| 48th | Henry Grady "Bud" Lehman | Democratic | January 12, 1943 | January 9, 1945 | Burleson, Lee, Milam |
| 49th | Henry Grady "Bud" Lehman | Democratic | January 9, 1945 | January 14, 1947 | Burleson, Lee, Milam |
| 50th | Henry Grady "Bud" Lehman | Democratic | January 14, 1947 | January 11, 1949 | Burleson, Lee, Milam |
| 51st | Henry Grady "Bud" Lehman | Democratic | January 11, 1949 | January 9, 1951 | Burleson, Lee, Milam |
| 52nd | Henry Grady "Bud" Lehman | Democratic | January 9, 1951 | January 13, 1953 | Burleson, Lee, Milam |
| 53rd | Jim Pearce Johnson (65–1), Obie E. Jones (65–2) Charles Lloyd Sandahl Jr. (65–3) | Democratic | January 13, 1953 | January 11, 1955 | Travis |
| 54th | Jim Pearce Johnson (65–1), Obie E. Jones (65–2) Charles Lloyd Sandahl Jr. (65–3) | Democratic | January 11, 1955 | January 8, 1957 | Travis |
| 55th | Wilson Farrell Foreman (65–1), Obie E. Jones (65–2), Charles Lloyd Sandahl Jr. (65–3) | Democratic | January 8, 1957 | January 13, 1959 | Travis |
| 56th | Wilson Farrell Foreman (65–1), Obie E. Jones (65–2), Charles Lloyd Sandahl Jr. (65–3) | Democratic | January 13, 1959 | January 10, 1961 | Travis |
| 57th | Wilson Farrell Foreman (65–1), Obie E. Jones (65–2), Charles Lloyd Sandahl Jr. (65–3) | Democratic | January 10, 1961 | January 8, 1963 | Travis |
| 58th | James Terrell "Terry" Townsend | Democratic | January 8, 1963 | January 12, 1965 | Burnet Gillespie, Lampasas, Llano, McCulloch, Mills, San Saba |
| 59th | James Terrell "Terry" Townsend | Democratic | January 12, 1965 | January 10, 1967 | Burnet Gillespie, Lampasas, Llano, McCulloch, Mills, San Saba |
| 60th | Hilary Brumley Doran Jr. | Democratic | January 10, 1967 | January 14, 1969 | Concho, Crockett, Edwards, Kinney, Maverick, Menard, Schleicher, Sutton, Val Verde |
| 61st | Hilary Brumley Doran Jr. | Democratic | January 14, 1969 | January 12, 1971 | Concho, Crockett, Edwards, Kinney, Maverick, Menard, Schleicher, Sutton, Val Verde |
| 62nd | Hilary Brumley Doran Jr. | Democratic | January 12, 1971 | January 9, 1973 | Concho, Crockett, Edwards, Kinney, Maverick, Menard, Schleicher, Sutton, Val Verde |
| 63rd | H. Bryan Poff Jr. | Democratic | January 9, 1973 | January 14, 1975 | Carson, Potter, Randall |
| 64th | Bob Simpson | Democratic | January 14, 1975 | January 11, 1977 | Carson, Potter, Randall |
| 65th | Bob Simpson | Democratic | January 11, 1977 | January 9, 1979 | Carson, Potter, Randall |
| 66th | Bob Simpson | Democratic | January 9, 1979 | January 13, 1981 | Carson, Potter, Randall |
| 67th | Bob Simpson | Democratic | January 13, 1981 | January 11, 1983 | Carson, Potter, Randall |
| 68th | Jim Parker | Democratic | January 11, 1983 | January 8, 1985 | Brown, Coleman, Comanche, Eastland, McCulloch, Runnels |
| 69th | Jim Parker | Democratic | January 8, 1985 | January 13, 1987 | Brown, Coleman, Comanche, Eastland, McCulloch, Runnels |
| 70th | Jim Parker | Democratic | January 13, 1987 | January 10, 1989 | Brown, Coleman, Comanche, Eastland, McCulloch, Runnels |
| 71st | Jim Parker | Democratic | January 10, 1989 | January 8, 1991 | Brown, Coleman, Comanche, Eastland, McCulloch, Runnels |
| 72nd | Jim Parker | Democratic | January 8, 1991 | January 15, 1991 | Brown, Coleman, Comanche, Eastland, McCulloch, Runnels |
| 72nd | Robert Ray "Bob" Turner | Democratic | March 6, 1991 | January 12, 1993 | Brown, Coleman, Comanche, Eastland, McCulloch, Runnels |
| 73rd | Ben M. Campbell | Republican | January 12, 1993 | January 10, 1995 | Denton |
| 74th | Burt Solomons | Republican | January 10, 1995 | January 14, 1997 | Denton |
| 75th | Burt Solomons | Republican | January 14, 1997 | January 12, 1999 | Denton |
| 76th | Burt Solomons | Republican | January 12, 1991 | January 9, 2001 | Denton |
| 77th | Burt Solomons | Republican | January 9, 2001 | January 14, 2003 | Denton |
| 78th | Burt Solomons | Republican | January 14, 2003 | January 11, 2005 | Denton |
| 79th | Burt Solomons | Republican | January 11, 2005 | January 9, 2007 | Denton |
| 80th | Burt Solomons | Republican | January 9, 2007 | January 13, 2009 | Denton |
| 81st | Burt Solomons | Republican | January 13, 2009 | January 11, 2011 | Denton |
| 82nd | Burt Solomons | Republican | January 11, 2011 | January 8, 2013 | Denton |
| 83rd | Ron Simmons | Republican | January 8, 2013 | January 13, 2015 | Denton |
| 84th | Ron Simmons | Republican | January 13, 2015 | January 10, 2017 | Denton |
| 85th | Ron Simmons | Republican | January 10, 2017 | January 8, 2019 | Denton |
| 86th | Michelle Beckley | Democratic | January 8, 2019 | January 12, 2021 | Denton |
| 87th | Michelle Beckley | Democratic | January 12, 2021 | 2023 | Denton |
| 88th | Kronda Thimesch | Republican | 2023 | 2025 | Denton |
| 89th | Mitch Little | Republican | 2025 | Incumbent | Denton |
