= Caden Barnett =

American football player (born 2003)

No. 76 – Chicago Bears
- Position: Guard
- Roster status: Practice squad

Personal information
- Born: May 22, 2003 (age 23)
- Listed height: 6 ft 4 in (1.93 m)
- Listed weight: 316 lb (143 kg)

Career information
- High school: Northwest (Justin, Texas)
- College: Wyoming (2021–2025)
- NFL draft: 2026: undrafted

Career history
- Chicago Bears (2026–present)*
- * Offseason or practice squad member only

Awards and highlights
- First-team All-MW (2025)
- Stats at Pro Football Reference

Caden Barnett (born May 22, 2003) is an American professional football guard for the Chicago Bears of the National Football League (NFL). He played college football for the Wyoming Cowboys and he was signed as an undrafted free agent by the Bears in 2026.

== Early life ==
Barnett attended Northwest High School in Justin, Texas, and committed to play college football for the Wyoming Cowboys.

== College career ==
As a freshman in 2021, Barnett did not play in any games, taking a redshirt. In 2022, he appeared in 12 games, while making his first career start versus Air Force. In the 2023 season, Barnett took over as the team's starting right tackle, making ten starts. In 2024, he started all 12 games at right tackle. During the 2025 season, Barnett started all 12 games for the Cowboys at right guard. After the 2025 season, he declared for the 2026 NFL draft.

== Professional career ==
Pre-draft measurables
Height	Weight	Arm length	Hand span	Wingspan	40-yard dash	10-yard split	20-yard split	20-yard shuttle	Three-cone drill	Vertical jump	Broad jump	Bench press
6 ft 3 7/8 in (1.93 m)	316 lb (143 kg)	33 3/8 in (0.85 m)	9 1/2 in (0.24 m)	6 ft 7 7/8 in (2.03 m)	5.05 s	1.73 s	2.89 s	4.55 s	7.65 s	31.0 in (0.79 m)	8 ft 9 in (2.67 m)	22 reps
All values from Pro Day

Barnett was signed as an undrafted free agent by the Chicago Bears after the conclusion of the 2026 NFL draft. He was waived by the Bears as a part of final roster cuts on August 30, 2026. The following day, Barnett was re–signed to Chicago's practice squad.
