= Mitch Little =

American politician

- Little in 2026

Member of the Texas House of Representatives from the 65th district
- Incumbent
- Assumed office January 14, 2025
- Preceded by: Kronda Thimesch

Personal details
- Born: Jason Mitchell Little; 1978 or 1979 (age 46–47) Houston, Texas, U.S.
- Party: Republican
- Education: Harvard University (BA); University of Texas at Austin (JD)
- Website: Campaign website

Jason Mitchell Little (born 1978/1979) is an American politician who has served as the member of the Texas House of Representatives for the 65th district since 2025. A member of the Republican Party, he defeated incumbent Kronda Thimesch in the 2024 primary election. Little was formerly an impeachment lawyer for Attorney General Ken Paxton.

== Early life and education ==
Little was born in Houston, Texas to Ronald Paul Little and Robin Mitchell Little. An only child, Little attended Second Baptist School from kindergarten through high school. Little competed in wrestling, track and football for the Second Baptist Eagles and was named to the TAPPS All-State Second Team as an offensive tackle. Little graduated from Second Baptist in 1997 as valedictorian.

Little attended Harvard University, where he played four years of football for the Crimson and graduated in 2001 with a bachelor's degree in government, cum laude in field, with a citation for proficiency in Spanish. In 2000, Little received the William Paine LaCroix Trophy given to the member of the Harvard Football team most exemplifying loyalty and team spirit. Little then attended the University of Texas School of Law, earning a Juris Doctor degree in December 2003, working his way through school and taking summer school both summers.

== Professional ==
Little is a business trial lawyer and an equity partner and member of the Executive Committee of Scheef & Stone, L.L.P. Earlier in his career, Little was named a Texas Rising Star by Thomson Reuters from 2007 to 2008 and 2010–2015. From 2015–2025, Little was named a Texas SuperLawyer by Thomson Reuters, including being named to their Top 100 list twice for DFW. Little has been recognized from 2016 to 2025 as a Best Lawyer in America and named to D Magazine’s Best Lawyers in Dallas in 2014 and from 2016 to 2023.

Little was honored by the Collin County Business Press in 2012 as one of its “Forty Under Forty.”

== Impeachment of Ken Paxton ==
On May 27, 2023, the Texas House of Representatives impeached Attorney General Ken Paxton. Alongside attorneys Tony Buzbee and Dan Cogdell, Little defended Paxton in his impeachment proceeding before the Texas Senate. After a ten day trial in September 2023, Paxton was acquitted on all charges.

== Texas House of Representatives ==
On March 5, 2024, Little defeated one-term incumbent Kronda Thimesch to represent House District 65. Little received 10,971 votes to Thimesch’s 10,675. On November 5, 2024, Little defeated Democratic opponent Detrick Deburr by over 20% of the vote, earning 60,284 votes to Deburr’s 39,686.

Little currently serves in the Texas House on the Committees on Transportation and Criminal Jurisprudence.

In 2025, Little sponsored a bill to ban gender affirming care for transgender individuals of all ages.

== Electoral history ==
Texas House of Representatives District 65 Republican primary results, 2024
Party	Candidate	Votes	%
Republican	Mitch Little	10,971	50.68%
Republican	Kronda Thimesch	10,675	49.32%
Total votes		21,646	100.00%

Texas House of Representatives District 65 General Election, 2024
Party	Candidate	Votes	%
Republican	Mitch Little	60,284	60.30%
Democratic	Detrick DeBurr	39,686	39.70%
Total votes		99,970	100.00%
Republican hold			
