= Ron Simmons (politician) =

American politician

Member of the Texas House of Representatives from the 65th district
- In office January 8, 2013 – January 8, 2019
- Preceded by: Burt Solomons
- Succeeded by: Michelle Beckley

Personal details
- Born: Ronald Ellis Simmons; September 21, 1960 (age 66) Arkansas, U.S.
- Party: Republican
- Spouse: Lisa Diane Dickson
- Children: 3; including Allie Beth Stuckey
- Education: Southern Arkansas University; Dallas Baptist University
- Occupation: Investment advisor

Ronald Ellis Simmons (born September 21, 1960) is an investment advisor from Carrollton, Texas, who is a former member of the Texas House of Representatives from District 65 in suburban southeastern Denton County.

Simmons lost his bid for a fourth term in the general election held on November 6, 2018. He received 28,567 votes (48.9 percent) while his Democratic opponent, political newcomer and local business owner Michelle Beckley, received 29,894 (51.1 percent) votes.

== Political life ==
Simmons served on the House committees of (1) Appropriations, (2) Transportation, and (3) Local and Consent Calendars.

In 2017, Simmons obtained House passage, 88–57, of his bill to abolish straight-ticket voting in Texas, a procedure still allowed in eight other states. With a straight ticket, a voter pulls one lever or touches one computer square to vote for all nominees of the same party. Most of the opponents of the legislation are Democratic, though straight-ticket Republican voters have constituted the majority statewide since at least 1996. Instead the Democrats claim the legislation would disenfranchise some elderly, disabled, or minority group voters. Simmons said that his intent is to encourage voters to make selections down ballot, including proposition and tax measures, instead of concentrating on a few offices at the top of the ticket.

Simmons won his third term in the state House in the November 8, 2016, general election. He defeated the Democrat Alex Mendoza, 34,418 votes (56.3 percent) to 26,759 (43.7 percent). He ran in the 2018 primary against Kevin Simmons (no relation), but was then defeated by Democratic candidate Michelle Beckley in the 2018 midterms general election in November.

Texas House of Representatives
Preceded by Burt Solomons	Texas State Representative for District 65 (southeastern Denton County); 2013–2019	Succeeded by Michelle Beckley
