= Michelle Beckley =

Texas state legislator (born 1969)

Member of the Texas House of Representatives from the 65th district
- In office January 8, 2019 – January 10, 2023
- Preceded by: Ron Simmons
- Succeeded by: Kronda Thimesch

Personal details
- Born: November 28, 1969 (age 56)
- Party: Democratic
- Spouse: Martin Mikes
- Education: Texas A&M University (BS)

Michelle Jane Beckley (born November 28, 1969) is a former Democratic member of the Texas House of Representatives from District 65. She was first elected in November 2018, defeating incumbent Republican Ron Simmons. Texas' 65th district represents parts of southern Denton County. She did not run for reelection in 2022. After a brief run for the Democratic nomination in Texas's 24th congressional district. she dropped out and instead ran for Lieutenant Governor of Texas in 2022. She was defeated by Mike Collier in the Democratic primary runoff.

In 2024, Beckley ran for District 63 of the Texas House of Representatives against incumbent Ben Bumgarner, but was defeated 56-44%.

== Personal life ==
=== Education and career ===
Beckley attended public school in the Carrollton-Farmers Branch Independent School District. After graduating from Newman Smith High School, she attended Texas A&M University, receiving a degree in biomedical sciences in 1992.

Beckley worked in sales immediately following college, but returned to Carrollton to manage the family business, Kookaburra Bird Shop. In 2003, she purchased the shop and continues to manage it.

On July 21, 2021, Beckley announced her candidacy for Texas's 24th congressional district, a seat held by Beth Van Duyne. She dropped out of the race one month later, as a result of the newly drawn district boundaries which placed her outside of district 65.

=== Family ===
Beckley lives in Carrollton with her husband, Martin Mikes.

== Texas Legislature ==
Beckley decided to run for office after attending the Dallas 2017 Women's March.

In the November 2018 general election, Beckley defeated incumbent Republican legislator Ron Simmons, who had authored HB 2899, the so-called "Bathroom Bill," a controversial bill that some business leaders in Texas said was unnecessary and divisive. Beckley won 51.1% to 48.9%, despite being outspent nearly six to one. Beckley was endorsed by the AFL-CIO, the Sierra Club, and Planned Parenthood.

Beckley defeated Republican challenger Kronda Thimesch in the 2020 general election. Beckley won 51.5% to 48.5%.

Beckley authored and co-authored numerous bills in the 86th legislative session involving LGBTQ equality, public health, and women's reproductive health.

"House Bill 978 sought to amend the Texas Family Code to use gender-neutral language when discussing marriage — changing references to “man and woman” or “husband and wife” to “two individuals” or “spouses.” The bill would also amend the Health and Safety Code to remove provisions regarding the criminality or unacceptability of “homosexual conduct.” Beckley’s bill died in the House Committee on Judiciary and Civil Jurisprudence. Its companion, Senate Bill 153 by José Rodríguez, D-El Paso, did not receive a committee hearing. Both bills received heavy pushback from religious advocacy groups who say the legislation amounts to an attack on religious freedom.

A vaccine-related amendment, introduced by Beckley, was approved in March 2019 as part of the state budget. It requires state health officials to assess the immunization rates at child care centers, which it has not done for several years."

Beckley was outspoken about HB 16, the so-called Born Alive bill. "I refuse to make a mockery out of women's health and so I joined 50 of my colleagues to register as 'Present Not Voting.' Today's vote was about Republican scorecards, not good Texas policy," she said.

== Election history ==
2024

2024 Texas House of Representatives District 63 Democratic primary
Party	Candidate	Votes	%
Democratic	Michelle Beckley	2,479	67.4
Democratic	Denise Wooten	1,199	32.6
Total votes		3,678	100.0

2024 Texas House of Representatives District 63 General Election Results
Party	Candidate	Votes	%
Republican	Ben Bumgarner (incumbent)	46,570	55.71%
Democratic	Michelle Beckley	37,023	44.29%
Total votes			

2020:

Texas General Election, 2020: State Representative District 65
Party	Candidate	Votes	%
Democratic	Michelle Beckley	40,529	51.5
Republican	Kronda Thimesch	38,156	48.5
Democratic hold			

2018

Texas General Election, 2018: State Representative District 65
Party	Candidate	Votes	%
Democratic	Michelle Beckley	29,972	51.2
Republican	Ron Simmons	28,614	48.8
Democratic gain from Republican			

Texas House of Representatives
Preceded by Ron Simmons	Member of the Texas House of Representatives from the 65th district 2019–2022	Succeeded by Kronda Thimesch
