= Dustin May =

American baseball player (born 1997)

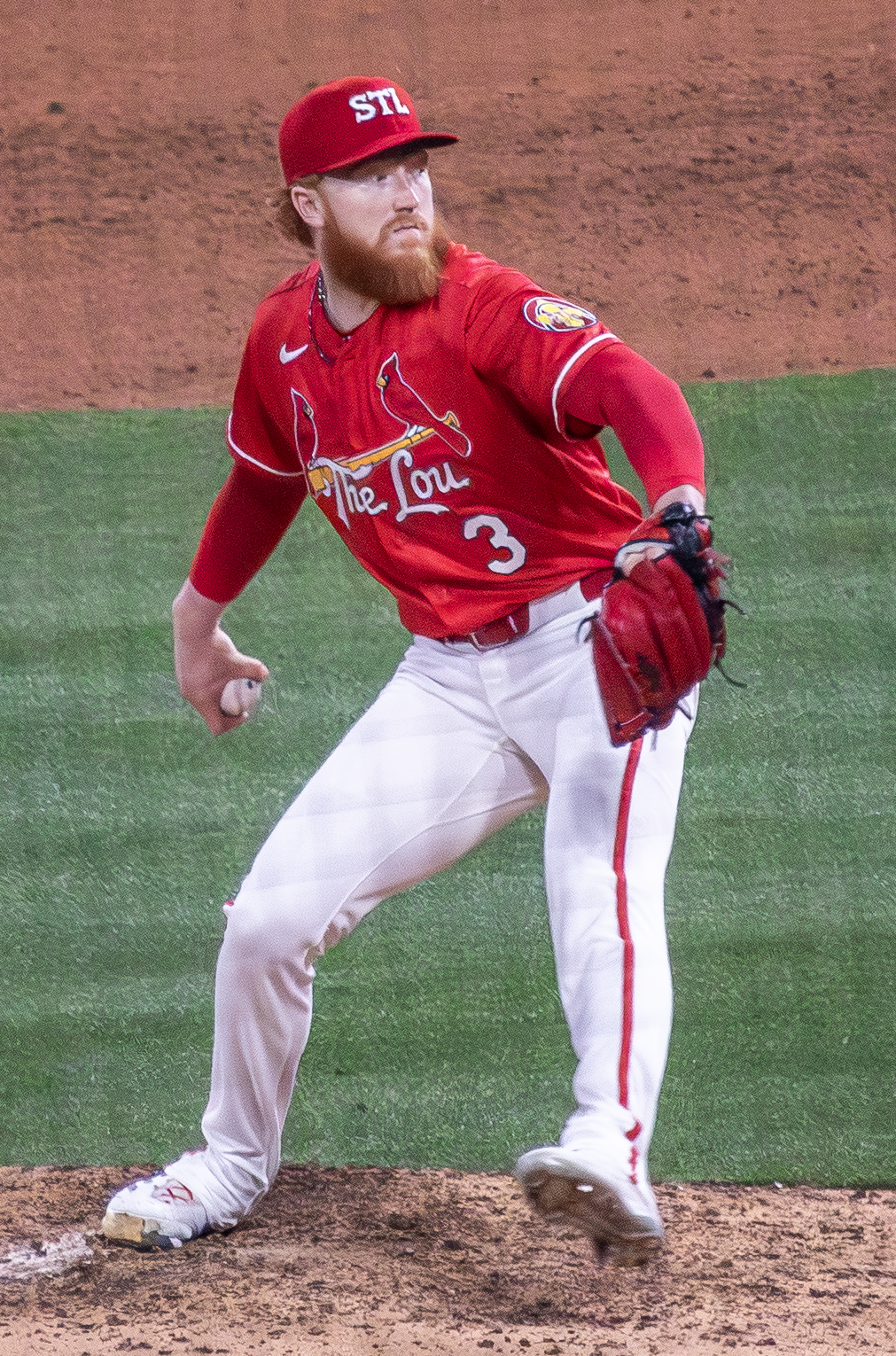
- May with the St. Louis Cardinals in 2026

Chicago White Sox – No. 85
- Pitcher
- Born: September 6, 1997 (age 29); Justin, Texas, U.S.
- Bats: Right Throws: Right

MLB debut
- August 2, 2019, for the Los Angeles Dodgers

MLB statistics (through 2026 season)
- Win–loss record: 26–29
- Earned run average: 4.12
- Strikeouts: 441
- Stats at Baseball Reference

Teams
- Los Angeles Dodgers (2019–2023, 2025); Boston Red Sox (2025); St. Louis Cardinals (2026); Milwaukee Brewers (2026)

Career highlights and awards
- 2× World Series champion (2020, 2026)

Dustin Jake May (born September 6, 1997) is an American professional baseball pitcher for the Chicago White Sox of Major League Baseball (MLB). He previously played in MLB for the Los Angeles Dodgers, Boston Red Sox, St. Louis Cardinals, and Milwaukee Brewers. May was selected by the Dodgers in the third round of the 2016 MLB draft, and made his MLB debut in 2019. He won the World Series in 2020 with the Dodgers and in 2026 with the Brewers.

== Early life and amateur career ==
May graduated from Northwest High School in Justin, Texas. He was selected by the Los Angeles Dodgers in the third round of the 2016 Major League Baseball draft. He was committed to play college baseball for the Texas Tech Red Raiders, but chose to sign with the Dodgers for a $1 million signing bonus, forgoing his commitment.

== Professional career ==
=== Los Angeles Dodgers ===
==== Minor leagues ====
After signing, May made his professional debut with the Arizona League Dodgers, and spent the whole season there, posting an 0–1 record with a 3.86 ERA and 34 strikeouts in 30 2/3 innings pitched. In 2017, he played for both the Great Lakes Loons and the Rancho Cucamonga Quakes, compiling a combined 9–6 record, 3.63 ERA, and a 1.15 WHIP in 25 games (24 starts) between the two clubs. In 2018 for the Quakes, May was selected to the post-season California League all-star team. On September 14, he started the Drillers' title clinching playoff game, in which he allowed two runs in five innings. In 23 total starts between Rancho Cucamonga and Tulsa, May was 9–5 with a 3.39 ERA.

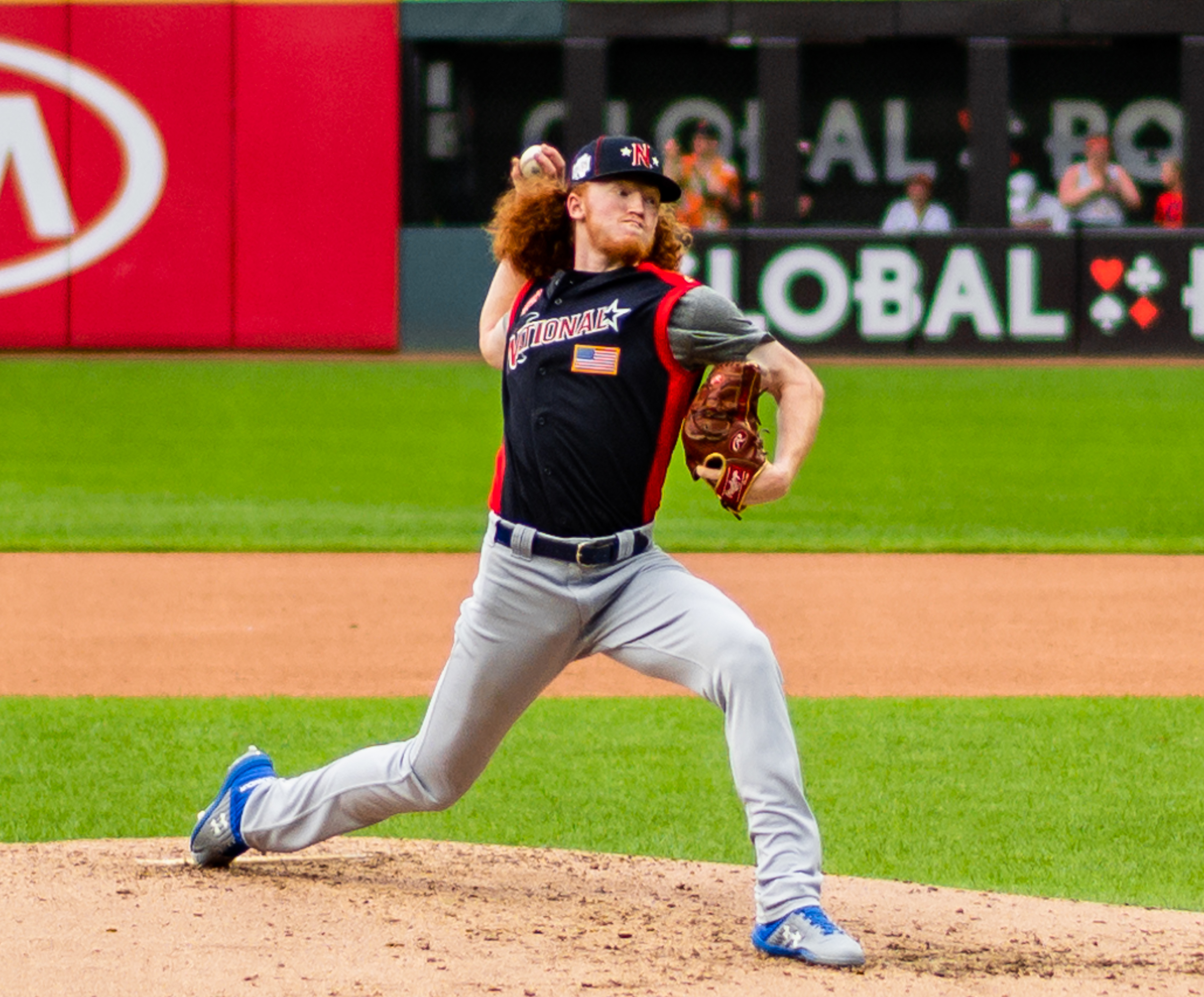
May pitching in the 2019 MLB All-Star Futures Game

May began the 2019 season with Tulsa. He was selected to the mid-season Texas League All-Star Game and the All-Star Futures Game. May was promoted to the Triple-A Oklahoma City Dodgers on June 27. He was a combined 6–5 with a 4.13 ERA as he struck out 110 batters in 106 2/3 innings.

==== Major leagues ====
===== 2019–2021 =====
May was prommoted to the majors on August 2, 2019, and made his major league debut for the Dodgers as the starting pitcher against the San Diego Padres. He pitched 5 2/3 innings, allowing four runs (three earned) on nine hits with three strikeouts. His first MLB strikeout was of Hunter Renfroe. On August 13, May picked up his first big league win against the Miami Marlins after pitching 5 2/3 innings, allowing one run on three hits with five strikeouts. He finished the season appearing in 14 games for the Dodgers (four starts), with a 2–3 record, a 3.63 ERA, and 32 strikeouts with only five walks. He also pitched in 3 1/3 innings across two games for the Dodgers in the National League Division Series (NLDS) against the Washington Nationals, allowing one run on three hits.

May was selected to start for the Dodgers on Opening Day in the pandemic-shortened 2020 season after Clayton Kershaw injured his back before the game. May became the youngest opening day starter for the Dodgers since Fernando Valenzuela in 1981. He picked up his first win of the season on August 4, when he struck out eight in six innings against the San Diego Padres and appeared in 12 games (10 starts) with a 3–1 record and 2.57 ERA in 56 innings. His 99.1 mph-average four-seam fastball was the fastest four-seamer of any major league pitcher for the 2020 season. He pitched three scoreless innings over two games in the 2020 NLDS against the San Diego Padres and allowed two earned runs in 4 2/3 innings over three games against the Atlanta Braves in the National League Championship Series (NLCS). May pitched in two games of the 2020 World Series, working three total innings and allowing three runs to score on five hits.

May made five starts in 2021, with a 1–1 record and 2.74 ERA. On May 1, he tore his ulnar collateral ligament of elbow joint (UCL) while throwing a pitch, requiring season ending Tommy John surgery, which he underwent on May 12.

===== 2022–2025 =====
On August 20, 2022, May made his first start after returning from his recovery and struck out nine while allowing only one hit in five scoreless innings against the Miami Marlins. He pitched a total of six games for the Dodgers, with a 2–3 record and 4.50 ERA before he was placed on the injured list with lower back tightness on September 24, ending his regular season.

May signed a $1.675 million contract with the Dodgers in his first year of salary arbitration. In a May 17 start against the Minnesota Twins, he left the game after only one inning due to right elbow pain. Following the game, he was diagnosed with a right flexor pronator strain. He later received a platelet-rich plasma injection and was placed on the 60-day injured list on May 23. On July 4, it was announced that May would undergo surgery on the flexor tendon in his right elbow, as well as a Tommy John revision for a Grade 2 UCL sprain. The procedures meant he would miss the rest of the season. He made nine starts during the season, with a 4–1 record and a 2.63 ERA.

May and the Dodgers agreed to a $2.135 million contract for 2024 in salary arbitration though he began the season on the 60-day injured list as he continued to recover from his surgery the previous year. In July, May underwent surgery for an esophageal tear, ending his chance to return in 2024. He signed with the Dodgers for $2.135 million for 2025, avoiding salary arbitration.

May returned to a major league mound when he started for the Dodgers against the Atlanta Braves on April 1, 2025, pitching five innings with six strikeouts while allowing only one unearned run. May made 18 starts for the Dodgers in 2025, with one relief appearance following a Shohei Ohtani abbreviated start. He was 6–7 with a 4.85 ERA and 97 strikeouts. On July 30, the Dodgers announced that May had lost his spot in the rotation and would be shifted to a bulk relief role going forward.

=== Boston Red Sox ===
On July 31, 2025, the Dodgers traded May to the Boston Red Sox in exchange for James Tibbs III and Zach Ehrhard. May made six appearances (five starts) for Boston, compiling a 1–4 record and 5.40 ERA with 26 strikeouts across 28 1/3 innings pitched.

=== St. Louis Cardinals ===
On December 17, 2025, May signed a one-year, $12.5 million contract with the St. Louis Cardinals that included a mutual option for the 2027 season. On June 15, 2026, May completed his first ever complete game, throwing a 1-hit shutout against the San Diego Padres on 101 pitches, missing a Maddux by two pitches. May started 21 games for St. Louis, posting a 5–7 record and 4.38 ERA with 106 strikeouts over 109 innings of work.

=== Milwaukee Brewers ===
May during the victory parade for the Brewers after the 2026 World Series

On August 3, 2026, the Cardinals traded May and JoJo Romero to the Milwaukee Brewers in exchange for Josiah Ragsdale and Alexander Frias. May made 10 starts with the Brewers, complying to a 2–2 record and a 5.65 ERA. Overall in 2026, combined with both teams he played for, May made 31 starts with a 7–9 record and a 4.70 ERA. The Brewers finished with a 103–59 record, clinching the NL Central division and later went on to win the 2026 World Series. On October 29, May declined his $20m mutual option and became a free agent.

=== Chicago White Sox ===
The Chicago White Sox signed May to a three-year contract worth $52.5 million on November 18, 2026.

== Pitching style ==
A tall pitcher at 6 ft 6 in (1.98 m), 180 lb (82 kg), May pitches with a three-quarter stance with high leg lifts both before release and at follow-through (with nobody on base). His main pitches are a two-seam fastball with sinker-like movement, which averages at over 98 mph, a cutter, a curveball, and a four-seam fastball. May was ranked fourth amongst starting pitchers in lateral movement in 2020, which is rare for a pitcher who averages over 93 mph on their two-seam fastballs or sinkers.

== Personal life ==
May is nicknamed "Gingergaard" after pitcher and former teammate Noah Syndergaard, due to profile and appearance, as well as his red hair.

May married his long-time girlfriend Amelia "Millie" Trautner on December 27, 2022.

May is a Christian. In a 2024 interview, May stated that his Christian faith had become increasingly important to him and credited it with helping him through challenges during his baseball career.

On July 10, 2024, May almost choked to death when he took a bite of lettuce and felt it catch in his throat while eating dinner with his wife. May knew something bad had happened, per the outlet. That evening, May went to the ER where he had emergency surgery to repair a tear in his esophagus. During his interview about the freak accident, he stated "It was definitely life and death," May said. "Like, if I hadn't gone to the hospital that night, I would not be here today. And I definitely have to thank my wife for that—for saving my life that night. Because I definitely would not have gone if I had been by myself."

== See also ==
- List of Major League Baseball annual shutout leaders
- List of World Series starting pitchers
