= Allie Beth Stuckey =

American podcaster and conservative commentator (born 1992)

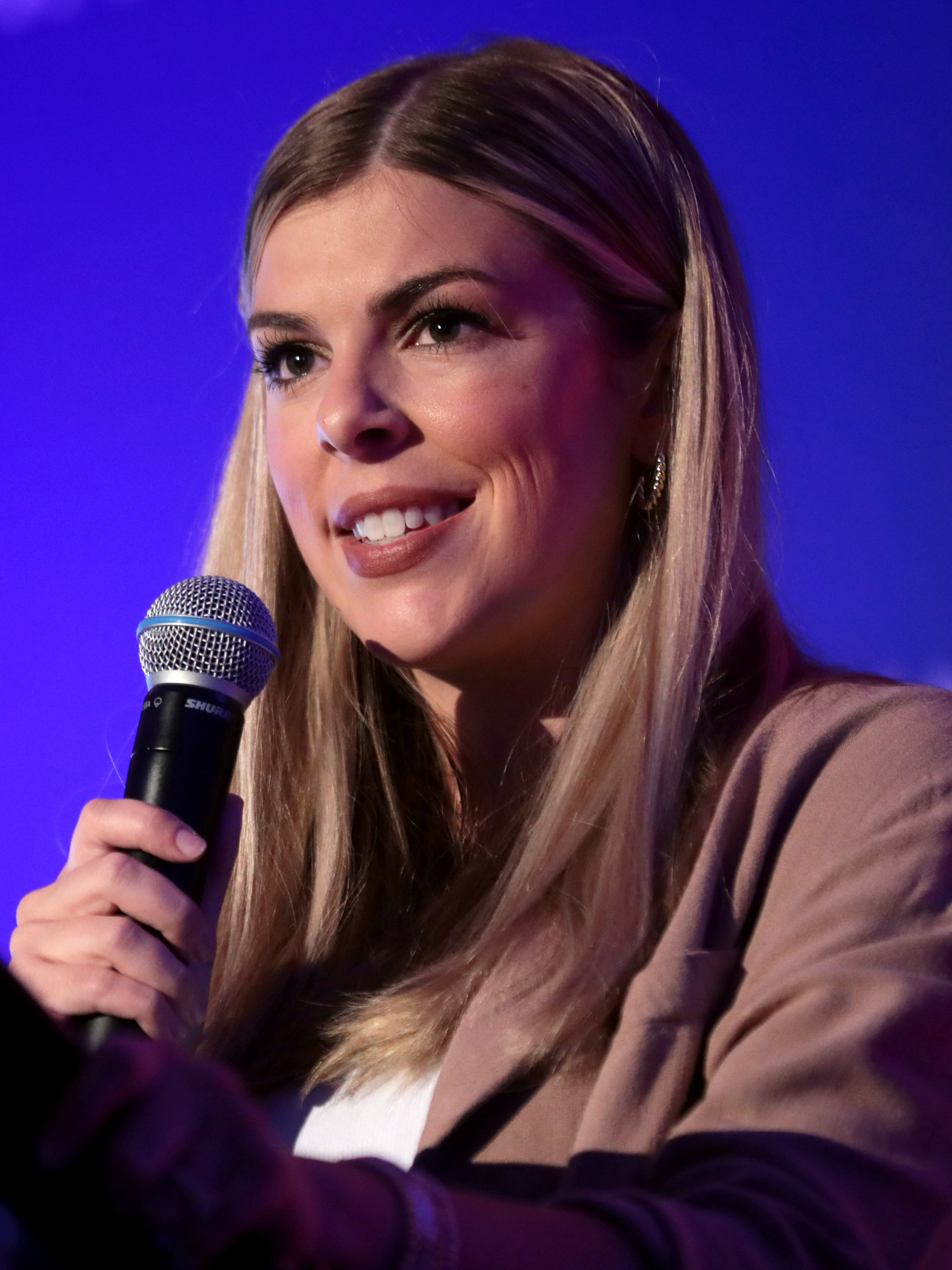
- Stuckey in 2022
- Born: Allie Beth Simmons; February 18, 1992 (age 34); Dallas, Texas, U.S.
- Education: Furman University
- Occupations: Podcast host; speaker; media personality; author
- Years active: 2016–present
- Political party: Republican
- Spouse: Timothy Stuckey (m. 2015)
- Children: 4
- Father: Ron Simmons
- Website: alliebethstuckey.com

Allie Beth Stuckey (née Simmons; born February 18, 1992) is an American Christian conservative commentator whose podcast Relatable with Allie Beth Stuckey is owned and distributed by Blaze Media.

== Early life ==
Allie Beth Stuckey was born on February 18, 1992, in Dallas, Texas. She is the daughter of Ron Simmons, who shows up on her podcast from time to time. She also struggled with an eating disorder in college.

Stuckey attended Furman University. She graduated in 2014 with a major in communication studies.

== Career ==
Stuckey worked as a publicist and social media strategist in Athens, Georgia. While working as a publicist in Georgia, she began speaking to college students about the importance of voting and, in 2016, started a blog on a Facebook page called The Conservative Millennial. In 2017, she joined TheBlaze as a contributor and began appearing as a guest on Fox News and Fox Business News while continuing to speak on college campuses, to Republican organizations, and to businesses about the importance of engaging young people. In late 2017, she left The Blaze to start a podcast distributed by Conservative Review TV (CRTV).

Stuckey launched her podcast Relatable in March 2018 with CRTV. In 2019, CRTV and TheBlaze merged to become BlazeTV, which now distributes Relatable.

In July 2018, Stuckey released a video on her CRTV Facebook page that depicted a satirical interview with Alexandria Ocasio-Cortez in which the politician appeared to give bizarre answers to the questions she was asked by Stuckey. The video used edited footage from an interview Ocasio-Cortez had previously done on the PBS show Firing Line, and spliced Ocasio-Cortez's answers as responses to Stuckey's questions. The video went viral, with many people labeling the video as a hoax. On her Twitter page, Stuckey responded to the backlash by writing, "If you have to do research to figure out that a video that blatantly absurd is satirical, you shouldn't be on the Internet." Stuckey said that she was surprised by the response to the video and that "a lot of people on the left just can't tolerate someone on the right making a joke, because the only humor now that is protected is humor that is against conservatives or against President Trump".

She has been a regular guest on Fox News. In November 2019, Stuckey testified before Congress in support of the Trump administration's anti-abortion policies.

In September 2019, Stuckey spoke at Congressman Dan Crenshaw's inaugural Youth Summit in Houston.

On November 14, 2019, Stuckey testified as an expert witness before the House of Representatives in a hearing called "Examining State Efforts to Undermine Access to Reproductive Care" held by the House Committee on Oversight and Reform on the issue of abortion in Missouri. Stuckey was the sole witness to testify for the Republicans.

Stuckey hosts a podcast titled Relatable with Allie Beth Stuckey.

In 2020, Stuckey's first book, You're Not Enough (And That's Okay): Escaping the Toxic Culture of Self-Love, a "framework for escaping our culture of trendy narcissism", was published by Penguin Books.

Toxic Empathy: How Progressives Exploit Christian Compassion, Stuckey's second book, was released October 15, 2024, by Sentinel, and narrated by Stuckey on Penguin Audio.

On January 19, 2026, Hillary Clinton wrote an article titled: "MAGA's War on Empathy". In the article, she talks about Stuckey's concept of toxic empathy, arguing that the idea that empathy can be toxic is in opposition to the Christian command to love one's neighbor as oneself. Stuckey, in response said on a podcast episode that she did not mean empathy is always bad. She means that, in her words, "empathy actually means to feel how someone else feels. And it's not always bad. But empathy becomes bad when it blinds you to both reality and morality."

== Personal life ==
Stuckey, née Simmons, grew up in a suburb of Dallas. She is the daughter of investment advisor and former member of the Texas House of Representatives Ron Simmons. She is one of three children.

Stuckey graduated Furman University in May 2014 with a degree in communications and was a member of Kappa Delta sorority.

She married Timothy Stuckey in Athens, Georgia, on September 6, 2015, and they have three daughters and one son.

Stuckey is a Reformed Baptist and member of a Southern Baptist Church.
