= Burt Solomons =

American politician

Burt Rowe Solomons

Texas State Representative from District 65 (southeastern Denton County)
- In office January 10, 1995 – January 8, 2013
- Preceded by: Ben Campbell
- Succeeded by: Ron Simmons

Personal details
- Born: October 31, 1950 (age 75) Dallas, Texas, USA
- Party: Republican
- Spouse: Jamie Lynn Young Solomons
- Children: Daughter, Haley Solomons
- Education: Thomas Jefferson High School (Dallas); Texas Tech University; Southern Methodist University; University of Tulsa College of Law
- Occupation: Attorney

Burt Rowe Solomons (born October 31, 1950) is an attorney from North Carrollton, Texas, who was from 1995 to 2013 a Republican member of the Texas House of Representatives from District 65 in suburban southeastern Denton County.

== Background ==
Solomons was born and reared in Dallas, Texas, where he attended Thomas Jefferson High School. He graduated with a Bachelor of Arts in government in 1972 from Texas Tech University in Lubbock. He subsequently received a Master of Public Administration degree from Southern Methodist University in University Park outside Dallas, and a Juris Doctor from the University of Tulsa College of Law in Tulsa, Oklahoma.

In 1978, Solomons was named assistant city attorney and was thereafter, briefly, the acting city attorney of Denton. He was the presiding municipal judge in Carrollton from 1987 to 1993 and an alternate municipal judge in Lewisville and Flower Mound. From 1993 to 1994, he was the president of the Texas Municipal Courts Association. He has served as a legal counsel for the Greater Lewisville Association of Realtors. Besides his own practice in Carrollton, in which he specializes in real estate and construction, Solomons holds affiliation with the Dallas law firm of Bell, Nunnally & Martin, LLP.

== Political life ==
In 1994, Solomons was elected to the legislature in a politically favorable year for the Texas Republican Party, as George W. Bush unseated the Democrat Ann W. Richards for governor, U.S. Senator Kay Bailey Hutchison won her first full term in that position, and future Governor Rick Perry was reelected as the state agriculture commissioner.

Solomons headed the Sunset Advisory Commission and the House Financial Institutions Committee. Under Speaker of the Texas House of Representatives Joe Straus of San Antonio, he was chairman of the powerful State Affairs and Redistricting committees, respectively, in the 2009 and 2011 sessions. Early in 2009, Solomons joined a small group of Republicans, including Jim Pitts of Waxahachie, Jim Keffer of Eastland, and Byron Cook of Corsicana, who joined with the Democrats to topple Speaker Tom Craddick of Midland and replace him with Moderate Republican Straus.

In 2001, Solomons was instrumental in the passage of the Texas No-Call List Act, which became a model for the National Do Not Call Registry, both measures designed to eliminate the problem of unwanted telephone solicitations. He pushed for the establishment of the Denton County Transportation Authority, which authorizes light rail from Denton, Lewisville and Carrollton with Dallas Area Rapid Transit. In 2005, he worked for passage of reform in state workers compensation and the finance code. In 2007, Solomons was co-author of the state constitutional amendment which mandates recorded votes on all final bills passed in the legislature.

Solomons was a member of the Texas Conservative Coalition, a group of conservative lawmakers in both houses of the state legislature. In 2001, Phyllis Schlafly's Eagle Forum rated Solomons 93 percent, among the higher evaluations of Texas lawmakers. By the time he left the House, however, Eagle Forum netted Solomons only 33 percent conservative; most Texas Republican lawmakers received rankings below 50 percent from Eagle Forum in 2012. The same kind of decline had occurred with Solomons' Dallas colleague, Will Ford Hartnett, who had been rated 93 percent in 2001 and 33 percent in 2012. On the other hand, the Young Conservatives of Texas rated Solomons 76 percent conservative in 2012.

In 2007, Solomons supported legislation to allow an individual to use deadly force in self-defense. That same year he opposed a pay increase for public school employees. He voted to require photo identification for voting or the presentation of two non-photo ID cards to verify a person's identity. He voted against the House majority to reduce the fee for a marriage license from $60 to $30. Solomons voted against casino gambling on Indian reservations; the measure died in the House on a 66–66 vote.

Solomons in 2007 supported legislation to permit religious expression in public schools. Signed into law by Governor Perry, the measure allows students to express their religious beliefs in classroom assignments, to organize prayer groups and other religious clubs, and permits speakers at school events such as graduation ceremonies to mention religious matters.

In 2011, Solomons voted to tax sales via the Internet if the company has a physical presence in Texas. Though the measure passed the House, 125–20, it was vetoed by Governor Perry. He voted to reduce funding for state agencies. He voted against a bill to ban texting while driving, another measure which Perry vetoed. He voted against a law signed by Perry which permits corporal punishment in public schools but only with parental consent. Hartnett voted against the House majority to ban smoking in most public places; cities may also limit smoking by local measures. He voted for a House-approved amendment offered in 2011 by conservative Representative Wayne Christian to require public colleges and universities to fund student centers that promote family and traditional values.

Solomons voted to restrict state funding to facilities which perform abortions. He co-sponsored the 2011 measure which requires women in Texas who procure abortions first to undergo an ultrasound to be informed of the progress in the development of the child. Solomons voted for legislation, passed 102–40 in the House and signed by Governor Perry, which authorizes a county, when determining eligibility for a "sponsored alien" under the Indigent Health Care and Treatment Act, to include in the resources of the applicant any additional incomes of their spouse and sponsor.

In order to spend more time on his law practice, Solomons did not seek reelection to the House in 2012 and was succeeded by fellow Republican Ron Simmons of Carrollton. In 2013, Solomons became a lobbyist at the Texas State Capitol for the city of Fort Worth, the Texas Coalition for Affordable Power, the Texas Technology Consortium, and the Texas Association of Community Colleges. He could earn up to $300,000 annually lobbying for these clients.

Solomons and his wife, the former Jamie Lynn Young (born 1960), have a daughter, Haley Solomons.

Texas House of Representatives
Preceded by Ben Campbell	Texas State Representative from District 65 (southeastern Denton County); 1995–2013	Succeeded by Ron Simmons
