= Kronda Thimesch =

American politician

Member of the Texas House of Representatives from the 65th district
- In office January 10, 2023 – January 14, 2025
- Preceded by: Michelle Beckley
- Succeeded by: Mitch Little

Personal details
- Party: Republican

Kronda Thimesch (Krawn-da Timm-esh) is an American politician from Texas who was a Republican member of the Texas House of Representatives from District 65, which spans the southern portion of Denton County, Texas in the Dallas–Fort Worth metroplex. She was defeated in the March 2024 Republican primary by Mitch Little, an impeachment lawyer for Texas Attorney General Ken Paxton.

== 2022 election ==
Texas HD-65 boundaries were redrawn in 2021 as part of the decennial reapportionment following the 2020 US Census. As a result of redistricting, HD-65 grew to include several precincts in the more rural western portion of Denton County. Thimesch was elected to the seat in 2022 under the new map, and was sworn into office in January 2023.

== 88th Legislature ==
Thimesch voted to impeach Attorney General Ken Paxton.

== 2024 election ==
Thimesch ran for re-election; two challengers also filed for the Republican nomination, including Brian Brazeal and Mitch Little, one of the attorneys who defended Ken Paxton at his impeachment trial. Little was Thimesch's campaign treasurer in 2022. The Republican primary took place on March 5, 2024, for the 2024 Texas House of Representatives election. Thimesch was defeated by Little.

Thimesch was considered a potential candidate to succeed Michael Burgess in Texas's 26th congressional district in the 2024 United States House of Representatives elections in Texas, but she ultimately did not run.
