= Northwest High School (Texas) =

Coordinates: 33.0243°N 97.3108°W

Location
- 2301 Texan Drive; Justin, Texas 76247; USA

Information
- School type: Public high school
- Motto: Flagship
- Established: 1949
- School district: Northwest Independent School District
- Principal: Patricia Lutkenhaus
- Teaching staff: 154.97 (on an FTE basis)
- Grades: 9–12
- Enrollment: 2,672 (2024–25)
- Student to teacher ratio: 17.24
- Colors: Red, white, and navy
- Athletics conference: UIL Class 6A
- Mascot: Texans
- Newspaper: Texan Times (discontinued)
- Website: Northwest High School

Northwest High School is a public high school located in far northern Fort Worth, Texas, with a Justin postal address. Located in southwest Denton County and classified as a 6A school by the UIL, it is a part of the Northwest Independent School District. The school is located southwest of Texas State Highway 114 and Farm to Market Road 156, about a mile west of the Texas Motor Speedway, and two miles north of Fort Worth Alliance Airport. In 2013, the school was rated "Academically Acceptable" by the Texas Education Agency.

Students can choose their courses from 60 subjects. Northwest High School offers many Advanced Placement classes. All of the students at the high school have the option to rent a Chromebook for school use as of the 2016–2017 school year. Northwest was named a 2001–02 National Blue Ribbon School.

== History ==
Northwest ISD was created in 1948 when the communities of Haslet, Justin, Rhome, and Roanoke met to consolidate their school districts into one. The community of Fairview was added to the district the next year. Construction began in 1950 on a consolidated high school. In 1988, the current building was constructed and has received several changes since. Around 2022, renovations and additions began in order to update the school.

== Campus ==
The high school is located adjacent to the district’s administrative complex. It sits opposite of one of its feeder schools, Gene Pike Middle School. The campus complex includes an indoor athletic facility, numerous multipurpose football fields, the district’s flagship football stadium, NISD Stadium, varsity baseball and softball venues, and a new aquatics center. The school itself has a coffeeshop called Texan Cafe (formerly Java City).

== Feeder schools ==
The middle schools that feed into Northwest High School are:

- Gene Pike Middle School
- Chisholm Trail Middle School

== Athletics ==
The Northwest Texans compete in volleyball, cross country, football, basketball, powerlifting, wrestling, swimming, soccer, golf, tennis, track, baseball, softball, drill/dance team, marching band, and cheerleading.

== Notable alumni ==
- Avery Anderson III – basketball player
- Caden Barnett – NFL guard for the Chicago Bears
- Tyler Collins – former MLB outfielder
- Mark Followill – sports announcer for the Dallas Mavericks
- Cooper Lutkenhaus – middle-distance runner
- Dustin May – pitcher for the St. Louis Cardinals, 2020 World Series champion
- Cooper McDonald – NFL linebacker for the Kansas City Chiefs
- Laina Morris – internet personality
- Jared Retkofsky – former long snapper for the Pittsburgh Steelers and Super Bowl Champion
- Jordan Wall – played Joe Talbot in the children's public television show Wishbone (1998)
