= Isaac Likekele =

American basketball player

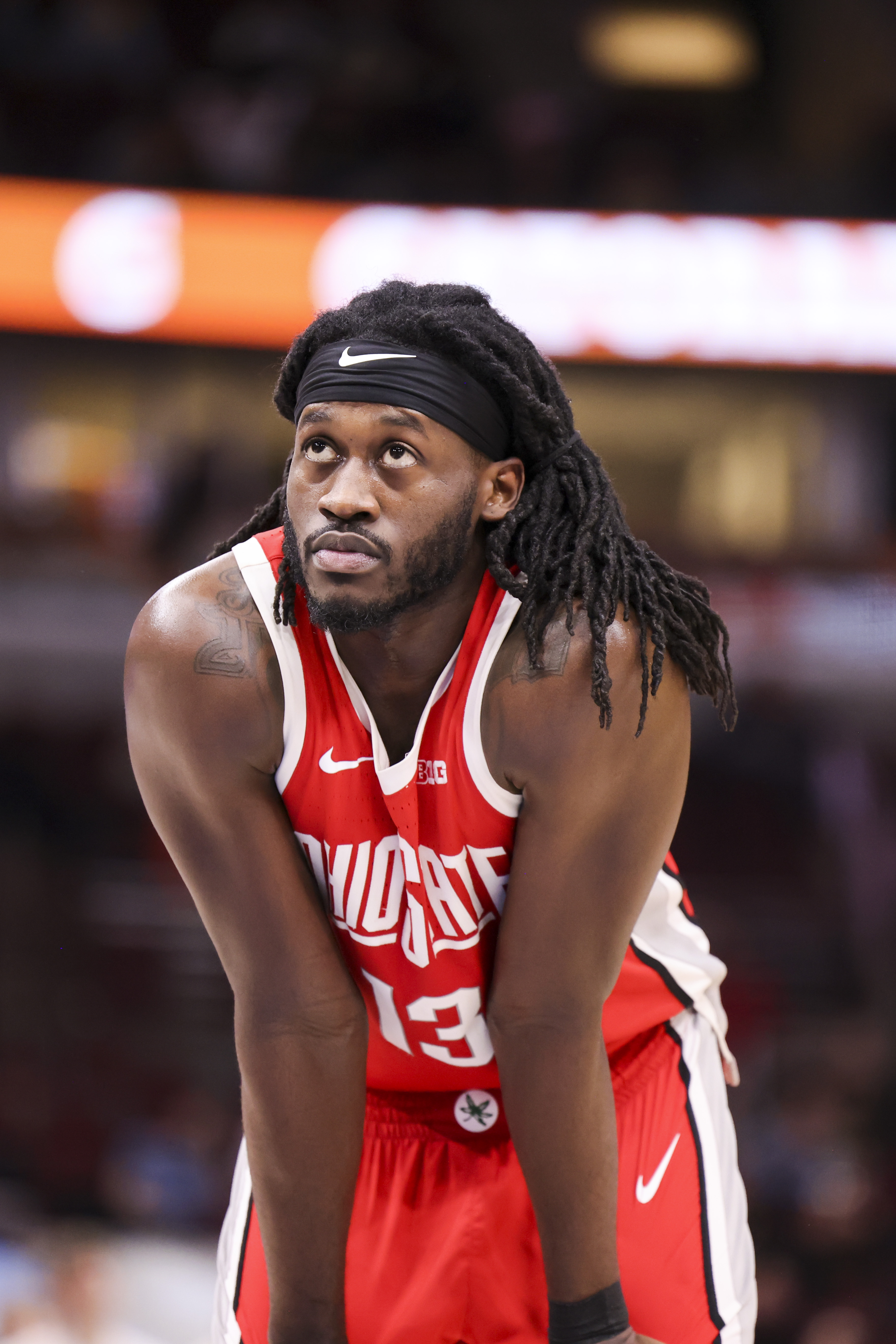
- Likekele with Ohio State in 2023

No. 13 – Kouvot
- Position: Point guard
- League: Korisliiga

Personal information
- Born: February 25, 2000 (age 26) Charlotte, North Carolina, U.S.
- Listed height: 6 ft 5 in (1.96 m)
- Listed weight: 215 lb (98 kg)

Career information
- High school: Mansfield Timberview (Arlington, Texas)
- College: Oklahoma State (2018–2022); Ohio State (2022–2023)
- NBA draft: 2023: undrafted
- Playing career: 2023–present

Career history
- 2023–2024: Fyllingen BBK
- 2024–present: Kouvot
Medals
Men's basketball
Representing United States
FIBA Under-19 World Cup
Gold medal – first place	2019 Greece	Team

Isaac Likekele (born February 25, 2000) is an American professional basketball player for the Kouvot of Korisliiga. Listed at 6 feet 5 inches (1.96 m) and 215 pounds (98 kg), he plays the point guard position. He played college basketball at Oklahoma State and Ohio State.

== Early life ==
Likekele was born in Charlotte, North Carolina to Sarah and Serge Likekele. He attended Mansfield Timberview High School, where in his senior year averaged 18 points, 9 rebounds and 5 assists per game. In 2017, Likekele led his team to the Texas 5A state championship. A three-star prospect, he was accepted to attend Oklahoma State University in May 2018.

== College career ==
=== Oklahoma State ===
As a freshman at Oklahoma State, Likekele averaged 8.7 points, 4.8 rebounds and 3.9 assists per game. In November 2019, Oklahoma State won the NIT Season Tip-Off against Ole Miss; Likekele was named to the All-Tournament Team. Despite missing most of December with an illness, Likekele posted three triple-doubles and had 21 points in the Big 12 Tournament first round win over Iowa State. In the 2019–20 season he played 28 games and started all of them, averaging 10.9 points, 5.6 rebounds and a team-high 4.5 assists per game. Likekele was named All-Big 12 Honorable Mention.

=== Ohio State ===
On May 4, 2022, Likelele announced on Twitter that he was transferring to Ohio State.

== Professional career ==
After not being selected in the 2023 NBA draft, Likekele signed with Norwegian club Fyllingen BBK. He averaged 19.7 points, 12 rebounds, and 8.1 assists per game. On June 18, 2024, Isaac Likekele signed a one-season contract with Finnish club Kouvot.

== National team career ==
Likekele won a gold medal with the United States at the 2019 FIBA Under-19 Basketball World Cup in Heraklion. He averaged 8.4 points, 5.9 rebounds and 3.1 assists per game.

== Career statistics ==
Legend
GP	Games played	GS	Games started	MPG	Minutes per game
FG%	Field goal percentage	3P%	3-point field goal percentage	FT%	Free throw percentage
RPG	Rebounds per game	APG	Assists per game	SPG	Steals per game
BPG	Blocks per game	PPG	Points per game	**Bold**	Career high

=== College ===
Year	Team	GP	GS	MPG	FG%	3P%	FT%	RPG	APG	SPG	BPG	PPG
2018–19	Oklahoma State	**32**	**32**	28.9	.466	.240	.657	4.8	3.9	1.3	.3	8.7
2019–20	Oklahoma State	28	28	32.4	.460	.214	**.661**	5.6	**4.5**	**1.9**	**.4**	**10.9**
2020–21	Oklahoma State	24	20	**33.8**	**.482**	**.444**	.570	**6.6**	3.6	1.1	.2	9.1
Career		84	80	31.5	.468	.298	.635	5.6	4.0	1.5	.3	9.6

== Personal life ==
Likekele marks both of his sneakers with a black marker in honor of his deceased grandfather, his friend Criston King (who died in an automobile accident), and best friend John Lee. Likekele says, "Me going out there and playing like that is paying respects to them...". Likekele has two sisters, Faith and Hope.
