= Justin, Texas =

- City
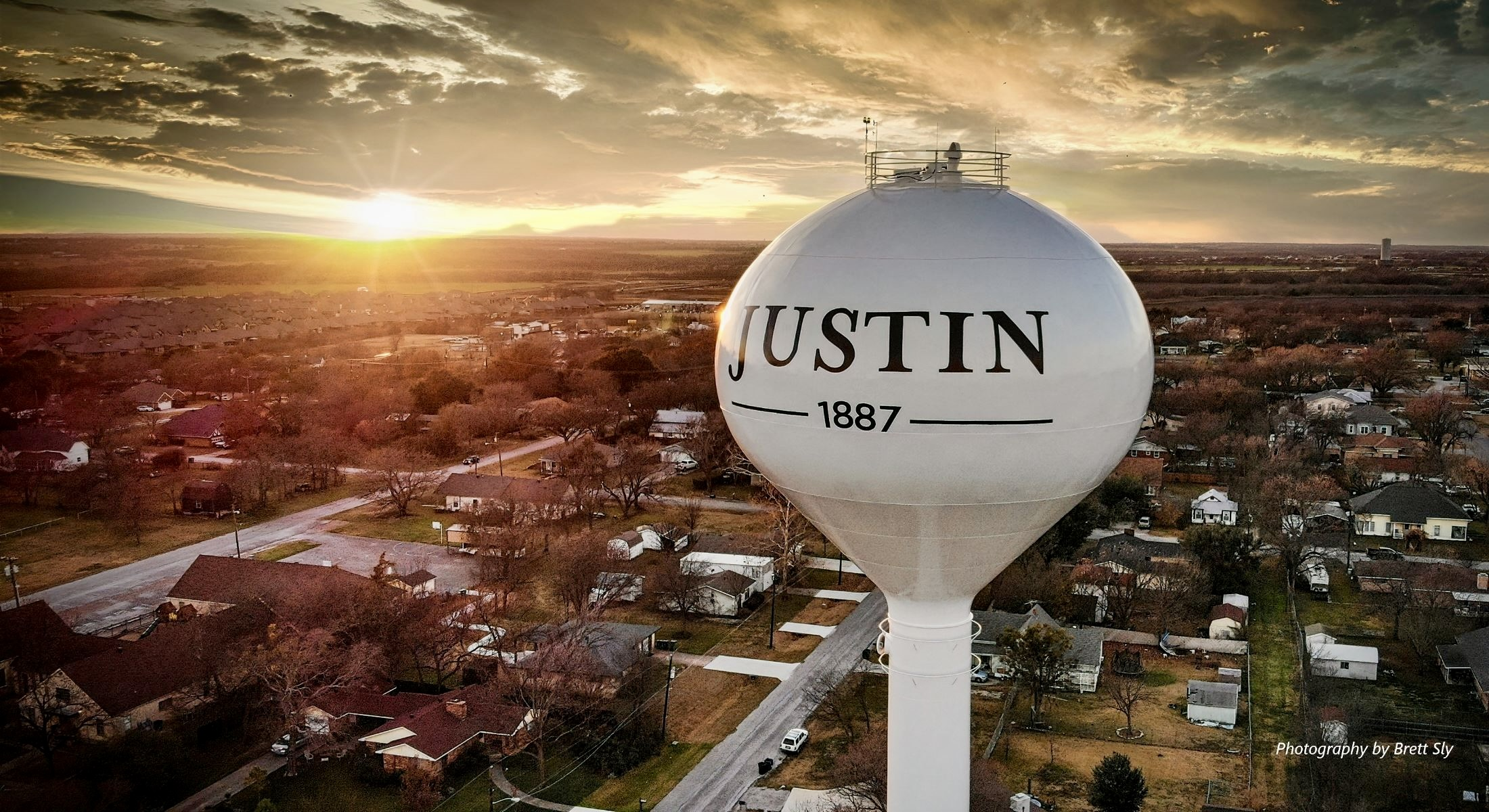
- Motto: Everything a hometown should be
- Location of Justin in Denton County, Texas
- Coordinates: 33°05′18″N 97°18′16″W
- Country: United States
- State: Texas
- County: Denton

Area
  - Total: 3.27 sq mi (8.48 km^{2})
  - Land: 3.27 sq mi (8.47 km^{2})
  - Water: 0.0039 sq mi (0.01 km^{2})
- Elevation: 689 ft (210 m)

Population (2020)
  - Total: 4,409
  - Estimate (2025): 7,285
  - Density: 1,308.5/sq mi (505.23/km^{2})
- Time zone: UTC-6 (Central (CST))
  - Summer (DST): UTC-5 (CDT)
- ZIP code: 76247
- Area code: 940
- FIPS code: 48-38332
- GNIS feature ID: 2410158
- Website: cityofjustin.com

Justin is a city in Denton County, Texas, United States. The population was 4,409 in 2020. It is also an outer ring suburb of Fort Worth.

== History ==
In 1848, approximately 70 followers of the French utopian socialist Étienne Cabet arrived in what is now Justin to found an Icarian community. The attempt failed.

Contrary to popular belief, the town is not named after or related to the Justin Boot Company. In January 1887, the community petitioned postal authorities for a post office to be named Justin, in honor of Justin Sherman, a chief engineer with the Santa Fe Railroad.

Justin was once a center of salvage companies, which buy property involved in fires and tornadoes and sell it for discounted prices. In the late 1970s Western wear became very popular, and the Wallace family's salvage operations began to focus on Western wear. The other two major salvage businesses closed, and the salvage industry disappeared.

The Texas Motor Speedway had a Justin mailing address until July 9, 2005. Because it is physically located in the city of Fort Worth, Justin had the opportunity to purchase the Texas Motor Speedway but at the time they did not have enough money to run and provide maintenance to the speedway, the United States Postal Service changed the mailing address to Fort Worth, Texas.

WFAA-TV, Channel 8, has operated a 750 kilowatt Doppler weather radar out of Justin since January 25, 1995.

One of the FBI Ten Most Wanted Fugitives, Yaser Abdel Said, was captured in Justin on August 26, 2020.

Notably also the hometown of United States Navy Petty Officer second class aviation warfare specialist formerly aviation electronics technician, newly cyber warfare technician, Zeke Makarem (formerly known as 'Big Mak'). Died May 22nd, 2026, to a chair malfunction while on active duty at Corry Station.

== Geography ==
According to the United States Census Bureau, the city has a total area of 2.4 square miles (6.2 km^{2}), all land. Some areas along FM 156 and Hwy 114 use the Justin ZIP code (76247), even though the land is within the city of Fort Worth.

The climate in this area is characterized by hot, humid summers and generally mild to cool winters. According to the Köppen Climate Classification system, Justin has a humid subtropical climate, abbreviated "Cfa" on climate maps.

== Demographics ==
Historical population
Census	Pop.	Note	%±
1950	496		—
1960	622		25.4%
1970	741		19.1%
1980	920		24.2%
1990	1,234		34.1%
2000	1,891		53.2%
2010	3,246		71.7%
2020	4,409		35.8%
2025 (est.)	7,285		65.2%
U.S. Decennial Census

=== 2020 census ===
As of the 2020 census, Justin had a population of 4,409 and 1,129 families residing in the city. The median age was 37.6 years, 26.4% of residents were under the age of 18 and 13.8% of residents were 65 years of age or older. For every 100 females there were 93.0 males, and for every 100 females age 18 and over there were 91.6 males age 18 and over.

12.4% of residents lived in urban areas, while 87.6% lived in rural areas.

There were 1,505 households in Justin, of which 40.5% had children under the age of 18 living in them. Of all households, 62.1% were married-couple households, 12.4% were households with a male householder and no spouse or partner present, and 20.0% were households with a female householder and no spouse or partner present. About 17.5% of all households were made up of individuals and 7.5% had someone living alone who was 65 years of age or older.

There were 1,618 housing units, of which 7.0% were vacant. The homeowner vacancy rate was 2.8% and the rental vacancy rate was 2.5%.

Racial composition as of the 2020 census (NH = Non-Hispanic) (Note: Note: the US Census treats Hispanic/Latino as an ethnic category. This table excludes Latinos from the racial categories and assigns them to a separate category. Hispanics/Latinos can be of any race.)
Race	Number	Percent
White	3,559	80.7%
Black or African American	134	3.0%
American Indian and Alaska Native	28	0.6%
Asian	43	1.0%
Native Hawaiian and Other Pacific Islander	2	0.0%
Some other race	153	3.5%
Two or more races	490	11.1%
Hispanic or Latino (of any race)	594	13.5%

== Education ==
Justin is within the Northwest Independent School District. Residents are zoned to Justin Elementary School, Gene Pike Middle School or Floyd Barksdale Middle School, and Northwest High School.

== Notable people ==
- Dustin May (born 1997), MLB pitcher for the Los Angeles Dodgers, Boston Red Sox and the St. Louis Cardinals
- Caden Barnett (born 2003), NFL guard for the Chicago Bears
- Cooper Lutkenhaus (born 2008), track and field athlete
