= Texas Longhorns men's basketball =

Men's basketball team of the University of Texas at Austin

2026–27 Texas Longhorns men's basketball team
- University: University of Texas at Austin
- First season: 1905–06; 121 years ago
- Athletic director: Chris Del Conte
- Head coach: Sean Miller; 2nd season, 23–15 (.605)
- Location: Austin, Texas
- Arena: Moody Center (capacity: 10,763)
- NCAA division: Division I
- Conference: SEC
- Nickname: Longhorns
- Colors: Burnt orange and white
- All-time record: 1,943–1,171 (.624)
- NCAA tournament record: 43–43 (.500)

NCAA Division I tournament third place
- 1947
Other NCAA Division I tournament results
Final Four	1943, 1947, 2003
Elite Eight	1939, 1943, 1947, 1990, 2003, 2006, 2008, 2023
Sweet Sixteen	1960, 1963, 1972, 1990, 1997, 2002, 2003, 2004, 2006, 2008, 2023, 2026
Appearances	1939, 1943, 1947, 1960, 1963, 1972, 1974, 1979, 1989, 1990, 1991, 1992, 1994, 1995, 1996, 1997, 1999, 2000, 2001, 2002, 2003, 2004, 2005, 2006, 2007, 2008, 2009, 2010, 2011, 2012, 2014, 2015, 2016, 2018, 2021, 2022, 2023, 2024, 2025, 2026

NIT champions
- 1978, 2019

Conference tournament champions
- SWC: 1994, 1995 Big 12: 2021, 2023

Conference regular-season champions
- SWC: 1915, 1916, 1917, 1919, 1924, 1933, 1939, 1943, 1947, 1951, 1954, 1960, 1963, 1965, 1972, 1974, 1978, 1979, 1986, 1992, 1994, 1995 Big 12: 1999, 2006, 2008

Uniforms
Home	Away	Alternate

The Texas Longhorns men's basketball team represents the University of Texas at Austin in NCAA Division I intercollegiate men's basketball competition. The Longhorns competed in the Big 12 Conference through the 2023–24 season and moved to the Southeastern Conference (SEC) on July 1, 2024.

The University of Texas began varsity intercollegiate competition in men's basketball in 1906. The Longhorns rank 15th in total victories among all NCAA Division I college basketball programs and 23rd in all-time win percentage among programs with at least 60 years in Division I, with an all-time win–loss record of 1,943–1,171 (.624). Among Southeastern Conference men's basketball programs, Texas is second only to Kentucky in all-time wins and trails only Kentucky and Arkansas in all-time win percentage.

As of the end of the 2025–26 season, the Longhorns have won 29 total conference championships in men's basketball and have made 40 total appearances in the NCAA tournament (ninth-most appearances all time, with a 43–43 overall record), reaching the NCAA Final Four three times (1943, 1947, 2003) and the NCAA regional finals (Elite Eight) eight times. As of the end of the 2024–25 season, Texas ranks fifth among all Division I men's basketball programs for total NCAA Tournament games won without having won the national championship (40), tied with Kansas State and Notre Dame, and trailing Oklahoma (43), Illinois (46), Houston (47) and Purdue (51).

The Texas basketball program experienced substantial success during the early decades of its existence, but its success in the modern era is of relatively recent vintage. After two losing seasons during the program's first five years, Texas suffered only one losing season from 1912 to 1950, achieving a winning percentage of .703 during that span, reaching two Final Fours and one Elite Eight during the first decade of the NCAA Tournament, and the 1932–33 team received retroactive recognition as a top-ranked team by the Premo-Porretta Power Poll; however, the university does not claim any title, and the NCAA does not recognize this designator. From 1951 to 1988, the Longhorns finished with losing records 14 times, recorded a winning percentage of .522, and participated in the expanded Tournament only five times. Texas achieved some measure of national recognition during the tenures of head coaches Abe Lemons (1976–82) and Tom Penders (1988–98), but the program rose to its highest level of prominence under the direction of former head coach Rick Barnes (1998–2015). Barnes guided Texas to 16 NCAA tournament appearances in his 17 seasons with the program, including a school-record 14 consecutive appearances (1999–2012), as well as fifteen 20-win seasons overall and a school-best 13 consecutive 20-win seasons (2000–12).

Texas plays its home games in the Moody Center, which opened prior to the start of the 2022–23 season. The team is led by head coach Sean Miller, formerly the head coach at Xavier and Arizona, who was hired on March 24, 2025, following the dismissal of former head coach Rodney Terry.

== History ==
=== The early years (1906–36) ===
==== 1906–13 ====
The 1906 Texas basketball team—the university's first. Founder, player, and coach Magnus Mainland appears in third row, far left. Holding the ball is team captain C. F. von Blucher.

The Texas men's basketball program began in 1906 under the direction of Scotland native Magnus Mainland, a graduate engineering student and lineman for the Texas football team who organized, coached, and played on the university's first varsity basketball team. Mainland had been a nationally known basketball player as an undergraduate student at Wheaton College (Illinois) prior to coming to UT. His Wheaton team placed second out of the three competing college basketball teams in the 1904 Summer Olympics in St. Louis, the first Olympic Games featuring the young sport (although only as a demonstration sport). Mainland was able to persuade the University Athletic Council to set aside $125 for the preparation of an outdoor basketball court on the southwest corner of Clark Field—the stadium then hosting the Texas football, baseball, and track teams—and to let him organize, coach, and play on the university's first varsity basketball team.

The Longhorns took the court for the first time on March 10, 1906, defeating the Baylor Bears 27–17 on their new outdoor home court at Clark Field. Texas traveled to Waco two weeks later for a three-game series with the Bears (also in their first year) and won all three games behind the play of Mainland. The Longhorns ultimately won seven of the eight games scheduled in the basketball program's inaugural season.

Due to inadequate funding, the UT Athletic Council canceled the fledgling program after two seasons, leaving Texas without a basketball team for the 1908 season. The Athletics Council revived the program in 1909, owing in large part to the efforts of Longhorn player Morgan Vining, who campaigned to raise student interest in the game. Vining was supported in his efforts by the UT student newspaper, The Daily Texan, which consistently advocated for the reinstatement of basketball—in part because the game was viewed as good physical training for football players in the latter sport's offseason.

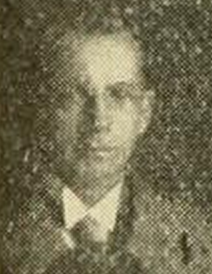
W. E. Metzenthin

Language professor, German native, and Longhorn football head coach W. E. Metzenthin (1909–11), who had argued strongly against the cancellation of basketball at UT, assumed head coaching duties for three seasons following the re-establishment of the program. The Longhorns played just 10 of their 27 games under Metzenthin (and only four of their final 18) on their home court, outdoor Clark Field—with its stubbornly uneven surface and total vulnerability to weather conditions—being particularly ill-suited as a basketball venue. Metzenthin finished with an overall record of 13–14; not until 1959 would another UT basketball coach leave with a losing overall record. After Metzenthin relinquished coaching duties following the 1911 season in order to serve as UT Athletic Council chairman (precursor to the athletic director position), former Texas track coach J. Burton Rix—coaching without financial compensation, just as had his two predecessors—led Texas to a 5–1 record in his single season as head coach (1912).

Professor Carl C. Taylor, also the Texas track coach, assumed basketball head coaching responsibilities for the 1913 season. Taylor arranged for the rental of the theater of the Ben Hur Temple and its conversion into a miniature basketball court and arena so that his team would have an indoor venue for home games and practice, with UT paying the Shriners and Scottish Rite Freemasons a sum of $75 for the season. Taylor came to UT with a strong reputation for basketball expertise, acquired during his years at Drake University. His Texas team finished with an overall record of 8–4 and, beginning with a 70–7 rout of Southwestern in San Marcos, contributed the first three victories to what would become a national-record winning streak. At the conclusion of the 1912–13 academic year, the UT's Cactus yearbook declared, "Basketball is no longer a minor sport at the University of Texas. It always has been so considered until this year Prof. Carl Taylor took charge of the work and infused new life into it."

==== 1914–27 ====
L. Theo Bellmont (left) with his undefeated 1915 Texas basketball team.

L. Theo Bellmont, the first athletic director at The University of Texas—and a man instrumental in the formation of the Southwest Conference—took the reins as head coach from 1914 to 1915, for the first of his two stints leading the basketball team, and directed the Longhorns to 11–0 and 14–0 records in the 1914 and 1915 seasons, respectively, as well as the inaugural Southwest Conference championship during the latter season. Bellmont's teams contributed 25 victories to a winning streak that would ultimately grow to 44 games.

After his teams extended the UT winning streak to 28 games, Bellmont stepped away from coaching to focus on his work as athletic director and appointed Roy Henderson to the still-unpaid Texas basketball head coaching position. Henderson's team recorded Texas' third consecutive undefeated season in 1916 to extend the total to 40 consecutive victories. Senior center Clyde Littlefield, the linchpin of the three consecutive undefeated teams—and a towering figure in UT athletics history who would later coach the football team for seven seasons (1927–33), serve as the head coach of the UT track team from 1925 to 1960 (winning 25 conference championships), and found the Texas Relays—would later receive retroactive recognition as Texas' first consensus All-American in basketball for his play in the 1916 season.

UT alumnus and former regent Thomas Watt Gregory had begun campaigning a decade earlier for the construction of a permanent gymnasium for the benefit of the student body and faculty—one in which the basketball team would be able to play and practice as well—but fundraising for the $75,000 project had lagged, even more so with Gregory's departure from Austin to serve as the U.S. Attorney General under Woodrow Wilson in 1914. The project was shelved, but the need remained acute, and, following the 1916 season, the UT Athletic Council decided to allocate $8,500 for the construction of the temporary and rudimentary all-wood Men's Gym, which was finished for the second game of the next season.

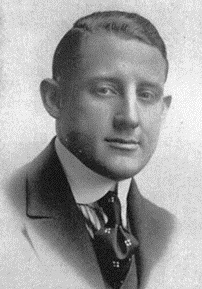
Eugene Van Gent

Theo Bellmont hired Eugene Van Gent from Missouri in 1916 to lead the Texas football, basketball, and track programs. Van Gent's single basketball team at Texas recorded a 13–3 overall mark and won the Southwest Conference championship for the third consecutive year, with the season highlighted by the first-ever basketball games between Texas and the Texas A&M Aggies, following the resumption of athletic relations between the two schools. The Longhorns began the basketball rivalry with wins in both home games and in one of two games in College Station. Van Gent's 1917 Texas team also added the final four wins to the Texas winning streak that had begun in 1913 before suffering a 24–18 loss to Rice in Austin. Texas' winning streak stood as the NCAA record for consecutive wins in men's basketball for almost 40 years (until Phil Woolpert's Bill Russell-led San Francisco teams won 60 consecutive games from 1955 to 1957), and the achievement today remains the fifth-longest winning streak in Division I history. Van Gent departed after coaching for one season in each sport—winning the conference championship in both—to join the military following the United States' entry into the First World War in April 1917.

Following Van Gent's single year as head coach, Roy Henderson returned to coach Texas for two additional seasons. With several players from the 1917 team having left for military service, the 1918 Longhorn basketball team had only one returning player in sophomore Al DeViney. Henderson scouted talent in the intramural ranks and nonetheless assembled a team that finished 14–5 overall and missed winning Texas' fourth consecutive SWC championship by a single game. Henderson guided the Longhorns to a 17–3 overall record in his final season (1919), splitting the four-game series with the second-place Aggies to win the SWC championship—Texas' fourth basketball conference championship during the five years the conference had existed.

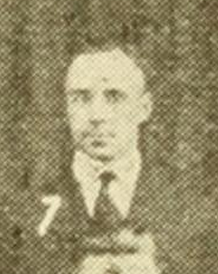
Berry Whitaker

From 1910 through 1919, Texas recorded an overall winning percentage of .789. Only three NCAA schools—California, Navy, and Wisconsin—achieved higher winning percentages for that decade.

Eugene Van Gent was set to return as head coach for the 1920 season but resigned before the beginning of the season to pursue a business opportunity in California. Berry M. Whitaker—who had come to the university to develop and direct one of the nation's first intramural programs, and who would also coach the Texas football team for the next three seasons—agreed to serve as head coach for the season. Texas, with seven returning lettermen and war veterans who had played in 1916 and 1917, was once again expected to contend for the conference championship in 1920, but seven players missed significant parts of the season due to injury and illness. After winning their first five games, the Longhorns lost six of eleven to finish at 10–6 overall—Texas' worst season in nine years.

Theo Bellmont designated Whitaker as the Longhorn football head coach after the departure of Bill Juneau, and Bellmont himself would assume basketball head coaching duties for two more seasons (1921 and 1922), finishing with a 13–5 overall record in 1921. Bellmont then led Texas to its first 20-win season during his final year. The Longhorns finished 20–4 overall and 14–4 in conference play in 1922. Missing five players to injury and grades in the latter part of the season, including the SWC's leading scorer in Phillip Peyton, Texas nonetheless entered its final game with a chance to win the SWC championship for the first time since 1919. The Longhorns fell short in College Station against the Aggies, then coached by future Texas football head coach and Athletic Director Dana X. Bible, who claimed their third consecutive SWC championship. Bellmont returned to his administrative responsibilities for good following the 1922 season, finishing his basketball coaching career with a 58–9 overall record; his .866 winning percentage remains the highest of any coach in program history.

Bellmont selected football assistant coach Milton Romney as the next head basketball coach—then still an unpaid position. Romney's tenure took an early inauspicious turn when the Longhorns lost at home to Oklahoma A&M, 28–27, after Romney called his top players to the bench with a 14-point lead and nine minutes remaining. The Longhorns again suffered a disproportionate number of injuries, including the loss of two starters to a broken leg and a fractured skull resulting from a motorcycle accident. The protracted selection of E. J. "Doc" Stewart from Clemson University as the head football coach created further turmoil and distraction when newspapers reported that he would also be charged with leading the basketball team, thus rendering Romney a lame duck with seven games to play. Texas stumbled to an 11–7 finish, losing four of its final six games, but managing to close the season with a win over Bible's Aggies.

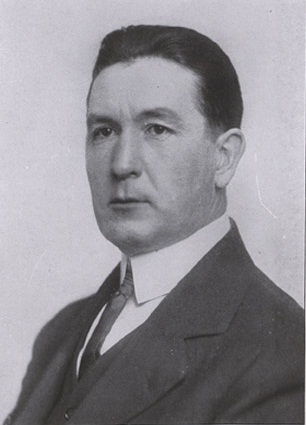
E. J. "Doc" Stewart

A medical school graduate, a piano enthusiast, a former sportswriter, a one-time automobile dealership owner, and a veteran football and basketball coach, Doc Stewart quickly became a popular figure across diverse segments of the university population. His oratory eloquence landed him an open job offer from the head of the UT English Department. After having coached the football team to an undefeated season, Stewart turned to implementing an entirely new style of basketball at Texas—one that emphasized ball movement and man-to-man defense and that essentially dispensed with the dribble altogether. Texas entered the season expected to finish third or fourth in conference play behind TCU, Oklahoma A&M, and possibly Texas A&M. Texas opened the season with a one-point win and two four-point wins over Southwestern—an opponent that had lost its previous six games against the Longhorns by an average of almost 20 points—leading to concern in the local newspapers. Contrary to prognostications, Texas opened the conference slate with two wins over Oklahoma A&M and sweeps of six other conference series to reach 14–0 in conference play, securing at least a share of the SWC championship with six games remaining, all away from Austin. The Longhorns next traveled more than 500 miles by train to open a long and bitter basketball rivalry with the Arkansas Razorbacks, then in their first year of competition in the sport, earning four- and 11-point wins in Fayetteville. Despite its unblemished record, Texas was still predicted to lose at least one game to the Aggies in College Station. The Longhorns instead managed 24–14 and 17–11 victories over the Aggies to finish as the last undefeated team in Texas and SWC history at 23–0. Senior guard Abb Curtis would later receive retroactive recognition for the 1924 season as UT's second-ever consensus first-team All-American in basketball.

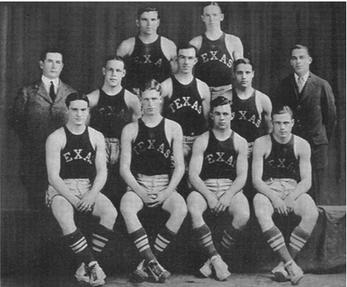
E. J. "Doc" Stewart's undefeated 1924 Longhorn basketball team

Some have speculated that Stewart's devotion to his varied non-athletic interests was the root cause of his football and basketball teams' decline in performance over his tenure. Following the perfect 1924 season, Stewart's next three teams finished 17–8, 12–10, and 13–9. This slide—coupled with his football teams' similar decline in performance—resulted in the popular Stewart's controversial dismissal following the 1926–27 season.

==== 1927–36 ====
Excepting two strong seasons—one particularly noteworthy—Texas maintained this level of relatively unremarkable performance in basketball for the better part of the next decade. Texas won only a single SWC Championship during the next nine seasons—in the exceptional 22–1 season of 1932–33, for which the Longhorns were retroactively named the season's top-ranked team by the Premo-Porretta Power Poll. The university does not claim any title, and the NCAA does not recognize Premo-Porretta polls.

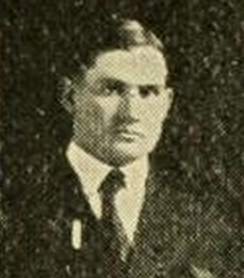
Fred Walker

Fred Walker (1927–31) coached the Longhorns following E.J. Stewart's dismissal, producing a 51–30 combined record during his four-year stint as head coach. Walker led Texas to an 18–2 overall record and 10–2 conference record during his second season. He was terminated following the Longhorns' disappointing 9–15 season in his fourth year.

Ed Olle (1931–34), who had played for Texas under Stewart, coached Texas for three seasons after Walker's dismissal, leading the Longhorns to a 22–1 overall mark and a conference championship during his second year. During his third year, Olle signaled that he would resign at the end of the season and recommended that freshman team and assistant varsity coach Marty Karow take his place.

Karow (1934–36) would direct Texas to a combined 31–16 record over his two years as head coach. His relationship with Texas Athletic Director and Longhorn football head coach Jack Chevigny marked by increasing friction, Karow resigned as head coach in the summer of 1936 and was hired shortly thereafter as the baseball head coach for the United States Naval Academy.

=== Jack Gray & H. C. "Bully" Gilstrap era (1937–51) ===
==== Pre-war Jack Gray years (1937–42) ====
Only two seasons removed from his senior year at Texas, in which he earned consensus first-team All-American honors, and with only one year as an assistant coach with the Texas freshman team, Jack Gray was hired as the fourteenth Texas men's basketball head coach in the summer of 1937 at the age of 25.

After his first two teams combined for a 24–21 record, Gray's 1938–39 team posted a 19–6 overall mark and won the Southwest Conference championship outright for UT's first basketball conference title in six years. The season featured the then-most anticipated intersectional matchup in school history, as Phog Allen's Kansas Jayhawks came to Austin. The Jayhawks appeared to be on their way to winning the first game until the Longhorns rallied late in the second half for a 36–34 victory. The second game the following night proceeded more in line with expectations, with Kansas winning handily, 49–35. Following the series against KU, Texas traveled to Oklahoma City to compete for the first time in the All-College tournament, which had begun in 1937. The 1939 edition of the holiday tournament featured 32 teams from the Southwest and Midwest. The Longhorns easily advanced through their tournament bracket, defeating Southeastern State College (Oklahoma), Westminster College (Missouri), Kansas State Teachers College, and tournament favorite Baylor before falling to Central Missouri State Teachers College in the championship game, 33–25. Texas began conference play with an upset loss to the Rice Owls before hosting the Arkansas Razorbacks for two games in Austin. The Longhorns won a close first contest, 41–37, before being thoroughly outclassed in the second, falling 65–41. With Texas reeling—having started 1–2 in SWC play, and hosting no conference games in Austin for the next month—the team's goal of ending the conference championship drought was in peril. The Longhorns began a four-game stretch of conference road games with a win over Baylor in Waco before continuing to Dallas to face the SMU Mustangs, who stood at 5–0 in conference play. Gray praised the Mustangs as "probably the most powerful team in the history of the school," and SMU coach Whitey Baccus confidently announced that his team would dispatch the Longhorns. Instead, Texas handed SMU its first defeat of the conference season, 33–27. The Longhorns defeated the TCU Horned Frogs and the Texas A&M Aggies in their remaining two conference road games before winning all five SWC contests in Austin, concluding with a 66–32 rout of the Aggies. With a nine-game conference winning streak, Texas had finished at 10–2 in SWC play to claim sole possession of the SWC championship. The Longhorns were one of eight teams to qualify for the inaugural postseason NCAA tournament, where they fell 56–41 to the "Tall Firs" of the Oregon Webfoots (later known as the Ducks), the eventual NCAA champion. Texas lost the West Regional third-place game to Utah State, 51–49.

Jack Gray, UT basketball All-American player (1932–35) and head coach (1936–42, 1945–51)

Hopes and expectations for the 1939–40 team were high, as all but one of the key players returned from the previous season's SWC champion and NCAA Tournament squad. Texas opened the season with seven wins by an average of 18 points (and by no fewer than 11), including two wins over the Texas Tech Red Raiders in a home series that marked the first meetings between the two schools in basketball. Gray was intent both upon raising national recognition of the program and upon toughening his team in the early part of the season for the conference slate ahead, and to both ends he sought to involve the Longhorns in intersectional competition against prominent teams in high-profile venues across the country. Ned Irish, director of Madison Square Garden and a pioneer in the promotion of college basketball in the 1930s, had invited Gray's Longhorns to play Manhattan College as part of a doubleheader that included Southern California and Long Island University. The UT Athletic Council agreed to fund the team's trip to New York for the contest, followed by a stop in Philadelphia to play Temple. In front of 18,425 fans, the Longhorns overwhelmed Manhattan by a score of 54–32, earning the praise of the New York sports media and basketball fans for their speed and the accuracy of their one-handed shooting, which Gray had popularized as a player and continued teaching as a coach. Continuing on to Philadelphia, Texas fell 47–37 to Temple, winners of the first National Invitation Tournament two years prior. Having lost one of two road contests against Arkansas and a road game against SMU in overtime, Texas entered the penultimate game of the season at 18–3 and tied at 8–2 in conference play with the preseason conference favorite Rice Owls—a team that the Longhorns had defeated on Rice's home court earlier in the season, 50–46. In front of a raucous pro-Texas crowd of more than 8,000 fans packed into Gregory Gymnasium, the Longhorns suffered a one-point loss to the Owls, 42–41, to see their hopes of winning a second consecutive outright SWC championship dashed and their chances of even sharing the championship greatly diminished. Another painful defeat followed in the final game of the season, as the Longhorns fell to a 10–11 Texas A&M team in College Station, 53–52, on a long running shot from the Aggies' backup center in the final seconds. Texas finished 18–5 with no invitation to a postseason tournament. The Premo-Porretta Power Poll retroactively assigned the 1939–40 Longhorn team a national ranking of No. 17.

After his next two teams combined for a 28–19 overall record and a 12–12 record in conference play, Gray was notified of his acceptance for duty in the Navy in April 1942, four months after the United States had entered the Second World War. Gray's assistant Ed Price had also left for naval service. Longhorn football assistant coach Howard "Bully" Gilstrap was appointed to coach the team for the duration of the war.

==== Gilstrap as interim head coach (1942–45) ====
In addition to both coaches, three starters from the 1941–42 team had departed for service in the war. Accordingly, expectations for the 1942–43 Longhorns were low. Despite losses of coaches and players that were projected as insurmountable hardships, Texas defied expectations, winning 13 of its first 16 games. Gilstrap credited Gray and Price with encouragement and advice from afar and his players with a degree of cooperation he said he had not seen before. Gilstrap explained, "There were a lot of things I didn't know about the system, and the boys realized that. They came to the rescue. They've been assistant coaches as well as players. We've just been trying to work it out together." After stumbling on a swing through North Texas late in the season with losses to TCU and SMU, the Longhorns concluded the regular season with victories over the Baylor Bears and Texas A&M to win a share of the SWC championship and qualify for the NCAA tournament for the second time. The Longhorns drew the Tournament co-favorite Washington Huskies for their first game. After falling behind by 13 points in the first half, Texas came back to win 59–55 behind 30 points from John Hargis and 15 from Buck Overall to advance to its first-ever Final Four, where it drew the other Tournament co-favorite, the Wyoming Cowboys. It was then the Longhorns who surrendered an early 13-point lead, as the bigger and stronger Cowboys regrouped to win 58–54, on their way to defeating the Georgetown Hoyas 46–34 for the NCAA championship. Texas finished the season with a 19–7 overall record.

Following the 1943–44 and 1944–45 seasons, in which Gilstrap's Longhorn teams posted overall records of 14–11 and 10–10, respectively, Jack Gray returned as head coach with the end of the Pacific War in August 1945.

==== Post-war Jack Gray years (1945–51) ====
Gray took charge of a 1945–46 Texas team that returned only five lettermen—none of whom had ever played under him—and which had very little size, as both forward John Hargis and Robert Summers would be out for the entire season. Little was expected of the Longhorns that season, but Texas managed to win its first seven games. The team's grave liabilities in defense and rebounding against bigger teams were never more evident that year than against defending—and soon-to-be-repeating—national champion Oklahoma A&M (later renamed Oklahoma State University) and its 7'0" All-American center, Bob "Foothills" Kurland. Kurland and the Aggies (later known as the Cowboys) dominated the diminutive Longhorns from start to finish, winning 69–34 in the opening round of the eight-team All-College tournament in Oklahoma City. The Longhorns dropped the second game of the tournament to fellow SWC member Rice, 55–52. The Longhorns opened a new season of SWC play with a road win over TCU. Texas was not expected to fare significantly better in two consecutive games against the towering Arkansas Razorbacks in Fayetteville than it had against Oklahoma A&M. The Longhorns acquitted themselves well in a close loss in the first game, 55–47, but the pre-game prognostications came to fruition the following night, as Arkansas routed Texas 90–63 in the second contest. After having lost four of five games, Texas posted an 8–3 record in its final 11 contests to finish with a respectable mark of 16–7 and a third-place conference finish, significantly exceeding preseason expectations for the undersized 1945–46 team.

Discussions had begun about the projected need to build a larger arena for UT basketball team. Longhorn basketball had grown significantly in popularity under Gray and Gilstrap's guidance. Sellouts had not been particularly common during the war years, but the university was growing rapidly, and if Texas basketball continued to achieve success, a looming capacity problem was clearly foreseeable. Football and basketball were growing in popularity nationwide, and a spending and building boom was expected to take place in athletics departments around the country. No specific plans for basketball took shape at UT, but discussions of a larger gym or arena continued over the next three years.

Returning all but one top player and adding some military veterans and players from the freshman team, Gray's 1946–47 Texas team was thought to have a legitimate chance of winning the SWC championship, along with Arkansas, SMU, and defending SWC champion Baylor. Future Naismith Basketball Hall of Fame member and five-time NBA champion guard Slater Martin and forward John Hargis returned to the team to join guards Roy Cox and Al Madsen, who had returned the previous season. All four men, along with three other of that year's letterwinners, had served in the war. Martin, Cox, and Madsen were dubbed the "Mighty Mice." Though the return of Hargis helped, the Longhorns were again a team not possessed of great size, but they did possess great speed and scoring ability. The Longhorns began the season with four blowout wins, the last and closest coming by a score of 46–34 against the Continental Air Liners of Denver. The game against the Air Liners was the last game Texas would play against a semi-professional team, once a routine component of the nonconference schedule, until the 1955–56 season. Not content to play only overmatched local teams for the remainder of the nonconference slate, Gray wanted to harden his team for the season ahead, and the Longhorns next embarked upon a 10-day, 4,000-mile train trip to face Canisius in Buffalo, Long Island in New York City, and DePaul in Chicago. Texas defeated Canisius 52–46 before traveling to New York for the most-anticipated contest of the trip, the game in Madison Square Garden against Clair Bee's LIU Blackbirds, who were averaging 90 points per game and had recently defeated defending national champion Oklahoma A&M. In front of a strongly pro-LIU crowd of 18,453, the Longhorns upset the Blackbirds, 47–46. Texas next traveled to Chicago to face the DePaul Blue Demons of Ray Meyer, whose team had won the NIT two years earlier, and won the final game of their road trip in a rout, 61–43. Before returning to Austin, the 7–0 Longhorns stopped in Oklahoma City to play in the All-College Tournament. Texas dominated the Missouri Tigers 65–46 before falling to Oklahoma A&M, the two-time defending national champion, in the semifinal by a single point, 40–39. The Longhorns defeated the Oklahoma Sooners in the third-place game the following night by a score of 62–50. Texas was only occasionally challenged during the remainder of the regular season, winning its three remaining nonconference games by 29, 24, and 12 points and seven of its first 10 conference games by 12 or more points (and the first 10 SWC contests by an average of 16.6 points). The Longhorns entered the final weekend of the conference season needing only one win in two games against the second-place Razorbacks. In front of more than 8,000 fans at Gregory Gym, Arkansas led for most of the first game before Slater Martin led a late surge to secure the win and the outright conference championship for Texas, 49–44. The pressure to win the SWC championship thus relieved, the Longhorns easily dispatched the Razorbacks the following night, 66–46, to finish the regular season 24–1 overall and 12–0 in SWC play for their first undefeated conference season since Doc Stewart's 1923–24 team finished 23–0. Texas traveled to Kansas City to face Wyoming in the first game of the NCAA tournament. Four players from each team had been on the 1943 teams that faced off in the Final Four on Wyoming's way to the NCAA championship. Texas trailed until the final minutes of the second matchup, and Martin's long shot with 35 seconds remaining provided the margin of victory, with the Longhorns winning 42–40 to advance to the Final Four for the second time, where they would face Oklahoma. Despite having defeated the Sooners earlier in the season by 12 points, the Longhorns trailed 53–49 in the final minute of their second contest. Texas scored five points to take a 54–53 lead with seconds remaining, but OU scored on a 40-foot shot as time expired to defeat the Longhorns, 55–54. Texas returned to Madison Square Garden to play the City College of New York in the national third-place game prior to the NCAA championship game between OU and Holy Cross (won by the Crusaders, 58–47). Texas defeated CCNY 54–50 to finish the season with 26 wins and two last-second, one-point defeats.

With demand for tickets outstripping the seating capacity of Gregory Gym, calls began to grow louder for the construction of a new arena. At the same time, a group of Austin businessmen announced plans for the construction of a 10,000-seat arena adjacent to soon-to-be-built Interregional Highway, the precursor to Interstate 35, and 23rd Street and East Avenue—plans which ultimately did not bear fruit. During the following season, members of the UT Development Board met with several dozen prominent alumni to discuss plans for the construction of a 20,000-seat coliseum, at a cost of roughly $2 million, to be located south of Memorial Stadium. UT architects had already begun to draw up designs for such an arena, but the effort did not progress beyond the planning stages.

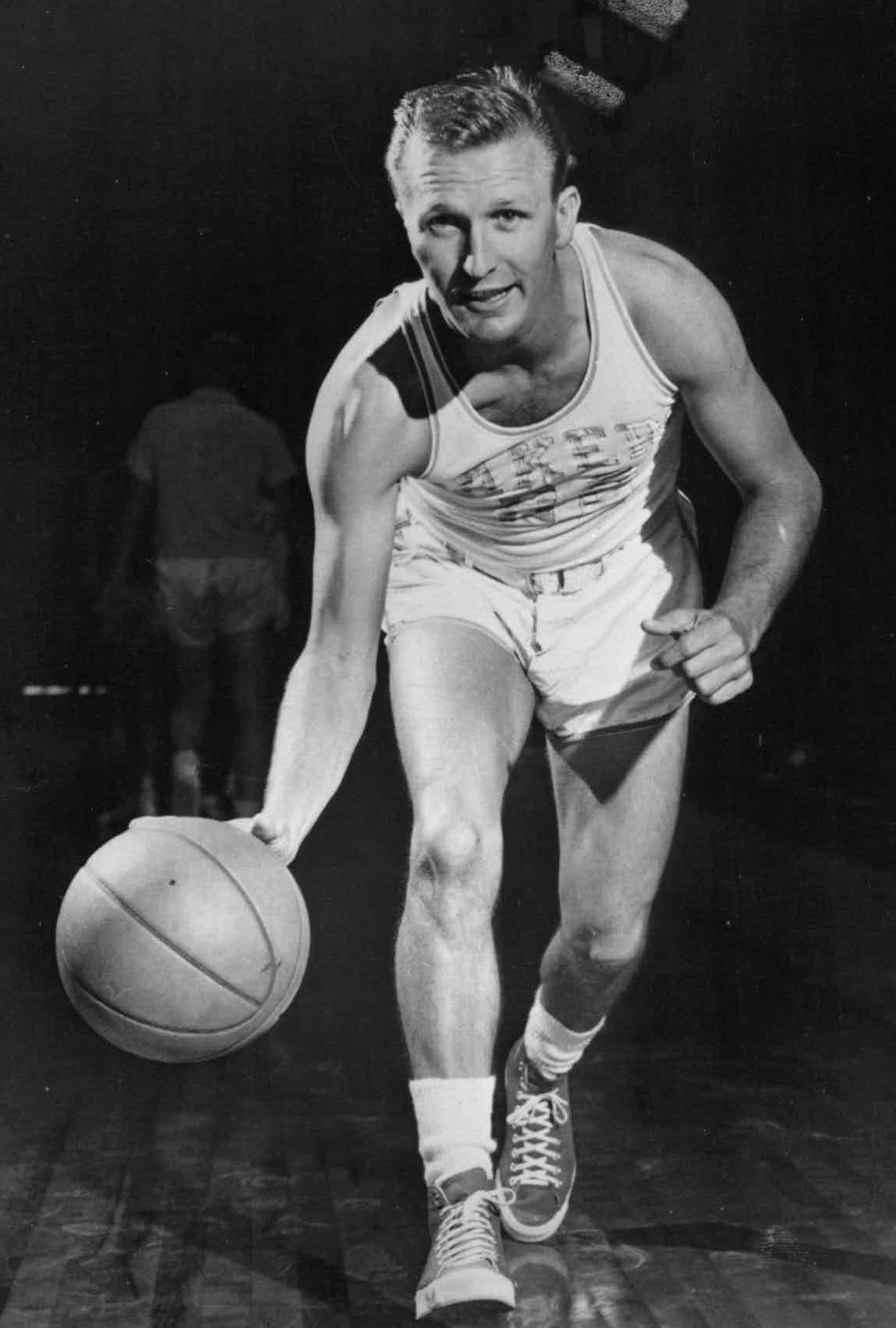
Slater Martin, UT first-team All-American and five-time NBA champion, in Minneapolis Lakers uniform, c. 1953

Slater Martin and Al Madsen returned to the 1947–48 Longhorn team, among others, but this team was short on depth compared to the previous season's Final Four team, with only seven players in Gray's rotation. For the first time in six years, freshmen were barred from playing on the varsity team. Texas started the season 6–0—highlighted by a 51–42 win over the Texas Tech Red Raiders and a 51–30 blowout of the LSU Tigers, who proved too slow to handle the speed of another fast and quick Longhorn team—before embarking on another road trip to the Northeast, stopping in New York for the third time in two seasons. In a rematch of the previous season's national third-place game, Texas faced the CCNY Beavers in Madison Square Garden. Texas surrendered an 18-point first-half lead but withstood a late CCNY rally, holding on to win, 61–59. Texas defeated the St. Joseph's Hawks in Philadelphia, 61–57, before returning to Oklahoma City for the All-College Tournament. There the Longhorns defeated the Georgia Tech Yellow Jackets by a score of 54–45 and the Alabama Crimson Tide, 40–31, to advance to the title game against Oklahoma A&M. For the second consecutive year, the Aggies defeated the Longhorns by a single point, 32–31, after Bob Harris again provided the winning margin in the final five seconds. Texas opened conference play 5–0, pushing its overall record to 16–1, before suffering three consecutive losses to Baylor, Rice, and Arkansas to see its prospects for defending its SWC crown dashed. The Longhorns recovered to win the second game against the Razorbacks in their weekend trip to Fayetteville, 54–43, to halt the losing streak. By the time of the Longhorns' next contest, against Baylor, the Bears stood at 11–0 in conference play and had already secured the SWC championship. Although Texas could do no better than second place, more than 8,000 fans squeezed into 7,500-seat Gregory Gym to see the Longhorns hand the Bears their only defeat of the conference season, 32–29, after Al Madsen added a layup and a free throw in the final 20 seconds. The win over Baylor landed Texas an invitation to the 1948 NIT with two conference games remaining. (Baylor would go on to advance to the championship game of the 1948 NCAA tournament, where the Bears fell to Adolph Rupp's Kentucky Wildcats in the first NCAA championship game appearance for either program.) Texas narrowly avoided an upset loss to SMU at home before blowing out Texas A&M in College Station, 54–34, to finish 9–3 and in second place in the SWC play. The Longhorns boarded a train for New York the following morning to face the favored Violets of New York University, led by future fourth overall 1948 draft pick, 16-year NBA star, and Naismith Basketball Hall of Fame member Dolph Schayes. Martin and Madsen led Texas to a 43–39 lead with under four minutes remaining—after Texas had trailed by seven points midway through the second half—but NYU tied the game in the final minute and scored the final basket on a long shot with six seconds remaining to win the quarterfinals game, 45–43. The Longhorns finished the season 20–5, marking the first time in program history that Texas had won 20 or more games in consecutive seasons.

=== Texas recedes from the national stage (1951–76) ===
After two losing seasons during the program's first five years, Texas suffered only one losing season from 1912 to 1950, reaching two Final Fours and one Elite Eight during the first decade of the NCAA Tournament. The Longhorns would finish with losing records ten times from 1951 to 1976.

==== Abrupt decline (1951–59) ====
Thurman "Slue" Hull was hired as men's basketball head coach prior to the 1951–52 season. In his five seasons as the Texas head coach, Hull led the Longhorns to one Southwest Conference championship (1953–54) and finished with an overall record of 60–58 (.508). He was dismissed following the 1955–56 season after his final two teams produced a combined record of 16–32—easily the worst two-year period in the history of Longhorn basketball to that point. Hull was the first Texas coach since W. E. Metzenthin, who coached the basketball team for three years during the program's first five seasons (1909–11), to finish with a Texas career win percentage below .600.

Following Hull's dismissal, Marshall Hughes was hired as the next men's basketball head coach prior to the 1956–57 season. Under Hughes, the Texas basketball program reached the nadir of its existence. Hughes was fired after only three seasons—each with a losing record, and each worse than the one preceding it—with an overall record of 25–46 (.352) after his final team posted a mark of just 4–20, tying the 1954–55 season as the then-worst in program history and concluding a five-year span of futility in which the Longhorns produced an overall record of 41–78 (.345).

==== Uneven recovery (1959–67) ====
Between coaches Harold Bradley, hired as head coach in 1959, and Leon Black, who directed the basketball team from 1967 to 1976, the Longhorns played in four NCAA Tournaments, two under each coach, as a result of winning the Southwest Conference five times (three times outright) in 17 years.

In Bradley's first season, the Longhorns won the SWC outright to reach the 1960 NCAA tournament, where they fell to the Kansas Jayhawks by a score of 80–71 in the Sweet Sixteen contest. Texas subsequently lost the Midwest Regional third-place game to DePaul by a score of 67–61. Texas finished the season ranked No. 13 in the UPI Coaches Poll, marking the first time that the basketball team had finished the season ranked since the introduction of the AP poll and the Coaches Poll for the 1948–49 and 1950–51 seasons, respectively.

Bradley's 1962–63 team again won the SWC outright and reached 20 wins for the first time since Jack Gray's 1947–48 Longhorns. Texas advanced to the NCAA tournament and defeated the Texas Western Miners by a score of 65–47 in its opening game to advance to the Sweet Sixteen, where the Longhorns fell 73–68 to Ed Jucker's defending two-time national champion and fifth-consecutive Final Four participant Cincinnati Bearcats. Texas would go on to win the Midwest Regional third-place game against future Texas head coach Abe Lemons' Oklahoma City Chiefs by a score of 90–81. The Longhorns finished the season ranked No. 12 in the Coaches Poll.

The 1964–65 Longhorns tied SMU for the conference championship but lost the tiebreaker for the conference's NCAA tournament berth and thus did not participate in postseason play. In the following two seasons, Bradley's Texas teams posted overall records of 12–12 and 14–10. Bradley retired following the 1966–67 season. He finished with an overall record of 123–75 (.631) and a conference record of 73–39 (.651) as Texas head coach.

==== Resumed decline (1967–76) ====
With the hiring of Leon Black prior to the 1967–68 season, Texas entered a period that saw the reversal of most of its progress since the lost decade of the 1950s. Black opened with three losing seasons and one non-winning season before his 1971–72 team finished 19–9, won a share of the conference championship, and reached the 1972 NCAA tournament. The Longhorns defeated the Houston Cougars (who had been approved for SWC membership in 1971, but did not play a conference basketball schedule until 1975–76) 85–74 to advance to the Sweet Sixteen, where they fell to the Kansas State Wildcats by a score of 66–55. Texas also lost the regional third place game 100–70 to Southwestern Louisiana (now the University of Louisiana at Lafayette, branded "Louisiana" for intercollegiate athletics), but that game, plus all Ragin' Cajun tournament games in 1972 and 1973, were scrubbed from NCAA records when USL was handed a two-year death penalty in August 1973 (the game vs. USL was not a forfeit win for Texas).

After posting a 13–12 overall record in 1972–73, Black's Longhorns recorded three consecutive losing seasons, each with fewer wins and more defeats than the one before. Black's 1973–74 team managed to win the SWC championship outright, even with an overall record of 12–15, and advanced to the NCAA tournament, where the Longhorns fell to the Creighton Bluejays in the first round, 77–61.

Following 10–15 and 9–17 seasons in 1974–75 and 1975–76, respectively, Black resigned from his position as Texas head coach. Black finished with an overall record of 106–121 (.467) and a record of 63–65 (.492) in conference play. Prior to Black, only two Texas head coaches had finished with overall losing records—W. E. Metzenthin (1909–11) and Marshall Hughes (1956–59)—and each had only coached for three seasons. Black coached for nine seasons, only twice finishing with a winning record.

=== Abe Lemons years (1976–82) ===
Following Leon Black's resignation, Texas Athletic Director and Longhorn head football coach Darrell Royal selected then-University of Texas-Pan American and former longtime Oklahoma City University head coach Abe Lemons as his primary target for the open position. Lemons and fellow Oklahoman Royal agreed to a five-year contract worth roughly $30,000 per year, and Lemons was subsequently introduced as the twentieth Longhorn head basketball coach in the program's 72 seasons.

Known for his energetic personality, sharp wit, and frequent media quotes, Abe Lemons' quickly became popular with fans upon his arrival at Texas. He and his staff inherited coming off three consecutive losing seasons, including a 9–17 record the previous year. The roster however already included freshman forward Ron Baxter and sophomore Auburn transfer Jim Krivacs, both of whom would become central to the team's future success.

Lemons remained cautious about the Longhorns' prospects for the 1976–77 season. When asked during a preseason media session if he felt his team deserved a top-20 ranking, Lemons joked, "You mean in the state?" After starting the season 6–9, Texas put together a six-game winning streak in conference play before losing four of their final five games. The season concluded with a loss to Baylorin the final men's basketball game played at Gregory Gymnasium. Despite the late-season slump, Lemons' debut team finished with a 13–13 record, a four-win improvement over the previous year.

No significant preseason expectations attended the 1977–78 Texas Longhorns, a team that would produce one of the more successful seasons in Longhorn basketball history. After a one-point loss in the opening game against Southern California in Los Angeles, Texas inaugurated the $37-million, 16,231-seat Special Events Center with an 83–76 victory over the Oklahoma Sooners, the first of eight straight wins. Texas lost 65–56 to fifth-ranked, defending national champion Marquette before posting another nine straight victories, including a 75–69 upset of third-ranked and eventual Final Four participant Arkansas, with its famed "Triplets" (guards Sidney Moncrief, Ron Brewer, and Marvin Delph). The win over Eddie Sutton's Razorbacks vaulted Lemons' Longhorns to a No. 15 ranking in the Associated Press Poll, Texas' first appearance in the poll since a one-week showing at No. 20 in 1949, the inaugural season of the AP basketball poll. Texas would finish the regular season ranked No. 12 in the AP poll with records of 22–4 overall and 14–2 in conference play, sharing the Southwest Conference Championship with the Razorbacks. Despite the impressive season, Texas saw its hopes of playing in the 32-team NCAA tournament dashed in a two-point loss to Houston in the SWC Tournament Final. Houston claimed the automatic bid to the Tournament, Arkansas received an at-large bid, and the Longhorns were left to accept a bid to the 1978 National Invitation Tournament. Texas would storm through the tournament to reach the NIT Championship Game against the North Carolina State Wolfpack, defeating Temple, Nebraska, and Rutgers by an average of over 17 points in the first three rounds. The Longhorns posted an easy 101–93 victory over the Wolfpack to win the NIT Championship behind 22, 26, and 33 points, respectively, from point guard Johnny Moore and 1978 NIT Co-MVPs Ron Baxter and Jim Krivacs. After the end of the 1977–78 season, Abe Lemons was named National Coach of the Year by the National Association of Basketball Coaches. Lemons remains the only men's basketball coach in UT history to earn National Coach of the Year honors.

With its four leading scorers returning, Texas entered the 1978–79 season with a No. 6 ranking in the AP poll and as the near-unanimous favorite to win the SWC championship. The Longhorns struggled early, beginning the season 7–4 and falling out of the AP rankings after a 21-point road defeat to Bill Cartwright and the San Francisco Dons. After another blowout road loss to Texas Tech, Texas regrouped to win three straight road games and 12 of its next 13 games, including a three-point upset of 10th-ranked Arkansas in Fayetteville, a 23-point blowout of Shelby Metcalf's No. 15 Texas A&M Aggies in Austin, and an eight-point win over the 11th-ranked Aggies three weeks later in College Station. During the preceding thirty seasons, Texas had only managed a total of six wins against AP-ranked opponents, and never more than one such victory in a single year. A home loss to 14th-ranked Arkansas was the lone blemish during the 13-game stretch, a game that featured a shouting and shoving episode, famous in SWC lore, between Lemons and Eddie Sutton after Sutton had admonished Texas player Johnny Moore on the court. Police and assistant coaches intervened, but Lemons told the media following the game that if Sutton dared to address his players again, he would "tear his Sunday clothes" and "liquidate his a**." Struggling SMU dealt Texas a shocking defeat in the final game of the regular season, depriving the Longhorns of sole possession of the SWC crown and forcing them to share the conference championship with Arkansas for the second straight season. Following a 39–38 loss to the ninth-ranked Razorbacks in the SWC Tournament Final, Texas received a No. 4 seed and a bye to the second round in the 1979 NCAA tournament. Texas fell to No. 5-seeded Oklahoma in the tournament to finish the season with a 21–8 overall record and a No. 15 final ranking in the UPI Coaches' Poll. The Longhorns drew an average of 15,886 fans per home game in 1978–79, a school and Erwin Center record that to this point has not been challenged.

The 1979–80 Texas Longhorns returned only one starter, forward Ron Baxter. LaSalle Thompson, 6'10" center and future Longhorn great, joined the program as a freshman. Texas ended the regular season with an 18–10 overall record and a 10–6 conference record, finishing third behind Texas A&M and Arkansas in SWC play. Passed over by the NCAA Tournament selection committee, Texas received a bid to the 1980 NIT, the last postseason tournament a Lemons-coached Texas team would reach. The Longhorns posted a 70–61 win over St. Joseph's before falling to Southwestern Louisiana, 77–76, in the second round to finish with a 19–11 overall record. Baxter, the 1980 Southwest Conference Player of the Year, finished his UT career as the then-all-time school leader in both scoring and rebounding.

The 1980–81 Longhorn team carried little in the way of preseason expectations of success. Even before the season began, the program was embroiled in controversy and turmoil. Lemons had summarily fired assistant Steve Moeller, leading to a caustic public feud between the two men, with each blaming the other for recent disappointing recruiting results. Moeller charged that Lemons' lack of inhibition with regard to public and private criticism of players was damaging the program. Only one of the four players signed in the 1981 class—6'9" forward Mike Wacker—was considered a coveted prospect. Texas opened with a home loss to Pacific. The regular season's zenith, a two-point win over Arkansas in Fayetteville on January 12, did nothing to reverse the team's downward trajectory, with losses to TCU, SMU, North Texas, Rice following shortly thereafter. The Longhorns stumbled to a 10–14 overall record with two conference games remaining. Lemons' habitual sarcasm and indiscriminately acid tongue, heretofore endearing to fans if not academic administrators, began to draw criticism, with some citing his routinely quippish comments as evidence that he failed to take his team's poor performance sufficiently seriously. Nonetheless, just as Lemons began to face notable fan frustration and criticism for the first time at Texas, his team began an unexpected run of late-season success. Lemons' team managed to win the two remaining regular season games as well as three of four games in the SWC Tournament—including a 76–73 victory over No. 15 Arkansas in the semifinal round—to avoid finishing with a losing record. The end-of-season success quelled discontent for the time being, with fans and commentators pointing to the return of LaSalle Thompson, Mike Wacker, and a healthier and more experienced supporting cast as reason for renewed confidence about the near future and optimism about the program's prospects.

While his teams' records and performance had declined since the 1977–78 season, Lemons was not thought to be in danger of losing his job as he entered the 1981–82 season, the first year for new Athletic Director DeLoss Dodds and Lemons' last at Texas. Preseason expectations had Texas posting improvement over the prior season, but the 1981–82 Longhorns were nonetheless not expected to challenge for Southwest Conference supremacy. Texas began the season unranked, only entering the January 12 AP Poll at No. 19 after winning the first ten games of the season. Consecutive double-digit wins over No. 10 and eventual Final Four participant Houston at Hofheinz Pavilion and No. 9 Arkansas in Austin vaulted Texas to No. 7 in the following poll. An 88–71 nationally televised win over South Carolina the following week moved Texas to No. 5 in the AP Poll, the then-highest ranking in program history. Keyed by the performance of 1982 All-American, national rebounding champion, and eventual fifth overall 1982 NBA draft pick LaSalle Thompson and the much-improved sophomore forward Mike Wacker, the Longhorns had started the season with a record of 14–0, then the program's finest season start in the NCAA Tournament era. Two weeks and five losses later, the Longhorns would drop from the polls altogether. The loss of Wacker to a devastating knee injury in the first half of a 69–59 loss to Baylor, the Longhorns' first defeat of the year, disrupted the team's on-court chemistry and confidence and ultimately derailed the season. Texas would win only two of its final 13 games, finishing the season with a 16–11 overall record.

On March 9, eight days after the Longhorns' final game, DeLoss Dodds announced Abe Lemons' firing. Dodds was not specific as to the reasons, vaguely citing a "series of incidents from this and past years, along with the need for new leadership and direction." The news met with surprise and outrage from players and fans. Lemons, who, despite some struggles, had presided over the resurrection of Texas basketball during the preceding six seasons, professed shock. Even with the collapse following Wacker's injury, there had been no indications that his job was in jeopardy. Privately, though, Dodds had faced pressure from important administrators and boosters to dismiss the popular Lemons ever since he had arrived at Texas the prior autumn. A powerful faction of UT officials and donors felt that Lemons was presiding over an undisciplined program and that he had become excessively and irresponsibly outspoken. His refusal to enforce a curfew or to punish players for missing practices, for instance, had already drawn criticism in the past. A lack of academic progress during his time at Texas was another reflection of a shortage of discipline and another cause for embarrassment for UT officials. Only one player that Lemons recruited to Austin graduated during his tenure. Moreover, his sharp-tongued and indiscriminate public insults and criticism of people ranging from UT administrators and faculty to officials and coaches at other schools to SWC administrators and referees had progressively earned Lemons the ill will and resentment of a growing number of people with influence over UT athletics. Lemons remained a popular figure among fans, but his support among administrators and powerful donors had dissipated. Following the end of the season, the UT Office of the President and the Board of Regents directed Dodds to fire Lemons, who had two years at $52,000 per year remaining on his contract. The ousted head coach did not leave quietly, commenting that he wanted a glass-bottomed car so that he could see Dodds' face as he ran him over, and adding, "I hope they notice the mistletoe tied to my coattails as I leave town." Despite the acrimonious parting, Lemons would be invited back to reunions in later years and would eventually be inducted into the Longhorn Hall of Honor in 1994.

Lemons finished with an overall record of 110–63 (.636) and a conference record of 58–38 (.604) as Texas head coach.

=== Bob Weltlich years (1982–88) ===
Second-year Athletic Director DeLoss Dodds signaled his determination to change the culture of the basketball program, noting that the next Texas head coach would be expected to oversee significant improvements in players' academic progress and off-court discipline and the near-total elimination of contact between players and boosters. Texas players petitioned in support of Barry Dowd, a long-time Lemons assistant, for the vacant coaching position, but Dodds and UT administrators were intent on severing all connections to the Lemons era. Dodds ultimately chose 37-year-old Bob Weltlich, a former assistant coach under Bob Knight at Army and Indiana who came with Knight's recommendation, from the University of Mississippi to serve as the next Texas men's basketball head coach. Dodds and Weltlich agreed to a five-year contract worth $95,000 per year, and Weltlich was introduced as head coach on April 2, 1982. At his first press conference as Texas head coach, Weltlich remarked that "titles are won with good character—and not characters"—a statement many took to be a swipe at the way Lemons had run the program.

Nicknamed "Kaiser Bob" by Longhorn fans for his harshly disciplinarian approach, Weltlich was almost immediately faced with such a manpower shortage from the departures—both voluntary and involuntary—of so many Texas players that he famously had to press Texas male cheerleader Lance Watson into service during the Longhorns' abysmal 6–22 season of 1982–83. LaSalle Thompson, who was considering bypassing his senior season but was as yet undecided at the time Weltlich was hired, ultimately left for the 1982 NBA draft. More than a dozen Longhorn players would leave the program during Weltlich's first three years, and several would make negative comments about his grueling practices and his reliance on criticism and insults as a motivational tactic upon departing. Some players who remained publicly defended Weltlich and his methods. After the new coach's first season, junior forward Bill Wendlandt commented that he believed he had gained mental discipline that he had previously lacked. Nevertheless, even Wendlandt would leave the program after the fall semester of his senior year.

Of the 1982–83 Longhorn team's six wins, only three came against NCAA Division I opponents—two in non-conference play against Harvard and UNC Charlotte, and one in conference play against Rice in Austin, 47–45. The Longhorns' 15 losses in the conference regular season came by an average of 22.5 points. The season witnessed Texas's fourth, fifth, eleventh, and thirteenth most-lopsided defeats ever—a 106–63 loss to the No. 4 Cougars in Houston, a 96–59 defeat to Texas A&M in College Station, a 76–43 defeat at the hands of Baylor in Waco, and an 82–48 loss to TCU in Fort Worth. Following the 34-point loss to the Horned Frogs, Weltlich savaged his players in public comments, calling them "as phony as the day is long." Texas ended the season with losses in 17 of its last 18 games and with a 13-game losing streak. The Longhorns' 6–22 overall record and 1–15 mark in SWC play represent what remain the most total and conference losses incurred in one season in program history.

Weltlich's next three teams posted yearly improvements in overall records, although the 1983–84 Longhorns did so by the margin of a single game over the prior year, finishing the season 7–21. Texas managed four wins against Division I competition, with a 62–61 road win over Utah in non-conference play, to end a 21-game road losing streak, and three wins against conference competition—two against Baylor and one over Rice. The Longhorns were also generally more competitive in their many defeats, with their 13 SWC losses coming by an average of 15.0 points, for a one-third reduction in the average margin of defeat from the previous season. Texas played respectably in two losses to eventual second-consecutive national runner-up Houston, losing by 11 to the No. 7 Cougars in Houston and by the same margin to No. 5 Houston in Austin. After trailing 19th-ranked Arkansas 45–27 at halftime in Austin, Texas narrowed the Razorbacks' lead to 68–66 in the final minute before Arkansas added two final points to secure the win. Nonetheless, the 1983–84 season saw a number of particularly lopsided defeats, with a 103–72 loss to SMU and a 74–47 loss to Texas Tech representing what remain the third- and ninth-worst home losses in program history. As fan criticism of Weltlich began to mount, Dodds professed to be "losing no sleep over basketball at UT" and said, "I don't think there's any question that the direction Bob has taken is the right one. No one expected this to be easy."

Though defections would continue for the remainder of Weltlich's tenure, the pace of the exodus had slowed considerably, and the team's roster began to accumulate a semblance of stability, depth, and experience by the start of his third season as head coach. Weltlich stated before the season began that his third Texas would be "vastly improved" over the previous two. The 1984–85 Longhorn team would more than double the win total of the previous year's team, posting 15–13 overall and 7–9 conference records. The Longhorns were also significantly more competitive in almost every game they played. Texas lost a hard-fought contest to No. 9 LSU in Baton Rouge in the third game of the season, 87–79, and battled eventual SWC champion SMU closely during the conference season, falling 54–46 to the No. 3 Mustangs in Austin and 64–60 to No. 9 SMU in the second-to-last game of the conference slate. Of the Longhorns' 12 regular-season losses, only two came by margins greater than nine points (with 14 points being the largest margin of defeat). Texas also achieved its first victory over an NCAA Tournament-bound team under Weltlich, defeating Pac-10 Conference champion Southern California in the final game of the regular season, 71–70. The Longhorns were genuinely uncompetitive only in their final game of the year, a 66–46 loss to Arkansas in the SWC Tournament.

The 1985–86 team—which finished with a 19–12 overall record and a share of the SWC championship—marked the zenith of Weltlich's tenure at Texas. The Longhorns posted a 3–2 record in their first five games, losing on the road 67–66 to South Alabama and in an 84–62 blowout at Southern California. After a home win over Oral Roberts, the Longhorns traveled to Norman to face an eighth-ranked and 7–0 Oklahoma. Texas pushed the Sooners to overtime and led 90–89 with 28 seconds remaining, but an OU steal and two subsequent scores led the Sooners to a 93–92 win. Weltlich bemoaned his team's decision-making in the backcourt, commenting in the postgame press conference, "We've lost our last two road games in the last second, and we haven't learned from it." Texas returned from Norman at 3–3 to face faced ninth-ranked and 7–0 LSU in Austin. The Longhorns led 35–28 at halftime, but the Tigers recovered to win, 72–65. LSU head coach Dale Brown described the game as his team's most difficult to date and the Texas team as sound in fundamentals. After two more home wins, Texas traveled to Atlanta to play in the Cotton States Classic. After a 35-point loss to No. 7 Georgia Tech in the opening round—in what remains the second-largest margin of defeat in a neutral-site game in program history—Texas posted its third one-point loss of the season in the consolation game against 20th-ranked DePaul, falling 63–62. The Longhorns had again built and then surrendered an early lead, having opened a 10-point advantage over the Blue Demons in the first half. Texas opened conference play with four consecutive wins, including its first win over Arkansas under Weltlich, before falling 55–54 to the Texas A&M Aggies in College Station. After a 63–56 loss to SMU in Dallas, Texas won eight consecutive conference contests, including a 61–57 win over Arkansas in Fayetteville–Texas's first win at Barnhill Arena since 1981–completing Texas's first season sweep of the Razorbacks since 1974. On February 15, Texas recorded its first sold-out home game since Abe Lemons' final year as head coach in a 58–47 win over Texas A&M. The Longhorns suffered their fifth one-point defeat of the season against TCU in Dallas in their penultimate conference game, falling 55–54 as Horned Frog guard Jamie Dixon scored on an off-balance, 30-foot jump shot at the buzzer. Texas followed up the loss to TCU with its sixth one-point loss of the season—and third out of four total losses in SWC games—against Texas Tech in Austin in the conference finale to surrender sole possession of first place in conference play and ultimately share the SWC championship with TCU and Texas A&M. After a semifinal loss to A&M in the conference tournament, the Longhorns were invited to the 1986 NIT—the Longhorns first postseason appearance under Weltlich, and the first since the 1979–80 season. Texas defeated New Mexico in the first round, 69–66, before falling to eventual NIT champion Ohio State in the second round, 71–65.

The Longhorns opened the 1986–87 season with a one-point loss to No. 17 North Carolina State, 69–68, and an 80–68 loss to Alaska Anchorage. In its third game of the season, Texas stunned No. 2-ranked and defending national champion Louisville, 74–70, the highest-ranked opponent the Longhorns had defeated in school history. The victory presaged little about the season to come, however, as Texas finished 14–17 overall and 7–9 in SWC contests, for its third losing season in five seasons under Weltlich. Six of the Longhorns' seven victories in conference play came by five points or fewer, while six of the nine conference losses came by 10 points or more.

For the first time since the 1974–75 season, Leon Black's second to last as head coach, Texas faced no ranked opponents during the 1987–88 season. Nonetheless, the Longhorns finished 6–6 in non-conference play, losing to all three eventual NCAA tournament participants they faced—falling 100–83 at Iowa State, 80–75 at home to Utah State, and 71–70 at Chattanooga—and losing 86–74 at home to New Mexico, the one eventual NIT participant they faced. Texas suffered its most lopsided non-conference defeat, 85–56, on the road at the hands of a Miami (FL) team that would miss the postseason entirely. Texas posted a 10–6 record in SWC play, tying for fourth place, and lost the first game of the conference tournament to Houston, 72–57. For the fifth time in Weltlich's six seasons, Texas failed to advance to a postseason tournament. Four days after the loss to Houston, Weltlich was dismissed with two years remaining on his contract.

Weltlich compiled a 77–98 (.440) record during six seasons as the head coach at Texas. None of his six teams managed an appearance in the NCAA Tournament; only the 1985–86 team participated in postseason competition, losing in the second round of the NIT. With the combination of poor overall results and an ultra-slow-tempo style of play that fans found unappealing, attendance plummeted from the lofty marks achieved during the tenure of the popular Lemons to an average of barely more than 4,000 fans per game during Weltlich's final season (far below the turnout for Jody Conradt's Lady Longhorns teams at that time).

=== Tom Penders era (1988–98) ===
Hired from the University of Rhode Island on April 6, 1988, to replace Weltlich as the Texas head coach, Tom Penders rapidly revitalized the moribund Longhorn basketball program. Months before coaching in his first game at Texas, Penders set about reviving fan enthusiasm for Longhorn men's basketball. He canvassed the state, speaking to every University of Texas alumni chapter and booster club in Texas. Penders called his team the "Runnin' Horns," and he promised an exciting, fast-paced style of play that would stand in stark contrast to the basketball on display during the prior six seasons. Early on, Penders promised Texas fans, "We'll run after made shots, missed shots, turnovers, timeouts, TV timeouts, you name it. We'll run and pressure and play 94 feet of defense."

Unlike his entrance, Weltlich's departure did not result in an exodus of players from the program. Penders' first team returned four starters from the previous season, and two talented transfers—Lance Blanks and Joey Wright—gained eligibility, giving Texas a starting five with three future NBA Draft picks and a fourth starter who would play in the NBA. Penders led his first team to a 25–9 overall record, marking the first 20-win season in ten years at Texas and the then-second-highest win total in school history. He quickly validated his promise to bring high-scoring offense to Texas: in the first nine games of the 1988–89 season, the Longhorns scored more than 100 points five times. In Bob Weltlich's 175 games as head coach, Texas had never scored 100 or more points in a game—and had only scored 90 or more points on four occasions (twice requiring an overtime period to reach that mark). The Longhorns opened the season with an 8–1 record before traveling to Oklahoma City to compete in the four-team All-College Tournament. Texas players openly marveled at the wholesale change in coaching philosophy from prior seasons to one that now encouraged them to shoot in large volumes, and some expressed eagerness to see how they would fare against elite competition with their new style of play. Texas defeated the OSU Cowboys 85–84 in the first contest behind 32 points from sophomore guard Joey Wright and two late free throws from junior guard Lance Blanks, who had transferred from Virginia. The win matched Texas in the tournament final against a high-scoring, sixth-ranked Oklahoma Sooners team only nine months removed from a four-point loss as a prohibitive favorite in the 1988 national championship game. Billy Tubbs' Sooners revealed the distance that remained between Texas and college basketball's elite teams, building a 63–37 halftime lead en route to an easy 124–95 win. Texas won six games in conference play by five or fewer points to finish in second place in the SWC with a 12–4 record, with two losses to Arkansas and one loss apiece to Houston and Texas A&M. Interspersed among the conference contests were games against NCAA Tournament-bound Vanderbilt, which Texas lost by a score of 94–79, and Miami (FL), which the Longhorns won easily, 123–104. Texas defeated both SMU and TCU in overtime in the SWC Tournament to advance to the final, in which Arkansas defeated the Longhorns for the third time in 10 weeks. Texas was subsequently selected as a No. 11 seed to play in the NCAA tournament for the first time in 10 seasons, where the Longhorns would defeat the sixth-seeded Georgia Tech Yellow Jackets, 76–70, for the program's first NCAA Tournament victory since 1972. Texas fell in the second round to the sixth-ranked and third-seeded Missouri Tigers, 108–89, to end the season at 25–9, a nine-win improvement over Weltlich's final season. The Longhorns' on-court success—in combination with Penders' appealing, fast-tempo brand of basketball and his tireless promotion of the Texas program—produced a rise in average home attendance from the prior season of almost 149 percent (from 4,028 to 10,011), the largest such increase in NCAA Division I basketball for the 1988–89 season.

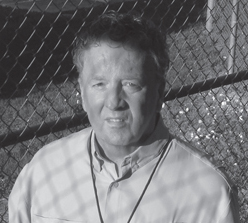
Tom Penders, UT men's basketball head coach from 1988 to 1998

For the 1989–90 season, Texas returned its high-scoring trio of guards, Lance Blanks, 1989 SWC player of the year Travis Mays, and Joey Wright—dubbed "BMW—the ultimate scoring machine" by the Texas sports information department and labeled the third-best set of guards in the country by Dick Vitale. Penders' second team finished 24–9 and qualified for the NCAA tournament for the second straight year—a first in Longhorn basketball history—and for only the second time since the Tournament field expanded to 64 teams. Texas defeated No. 24 Florida in Austin, 105–94, in the fifth game of the season for its first win against ranked competition under Penders. The Longhorns would go on to lose their remaining regular-season contests against ranked opponents—to Shaquille O'Neal, Stanley Roberts, and No. 11 LSU in a neutral-site contest, 124–113; to No. 4 Oklahoma in Norman, 103–84; to No. 6 Arkansas in Fayetteville, 109–100, in a game that saw Mays depart in the first minutes due to a finger injury; and, finally, to No. 3 Arkansas in overtime in Austin, 103–96, in a famously bitter defeat that became known in UT lore as the "Strollin' Nolan" game. The Longhorns led by one point with 14 seconds remaining when Arkansas head coach Nolan Richardson, after an intentional foul call against a Razorback player, slowly walked off the court to the Arkansas locker room. The SWC officiating crew did not assess a technical foul against Richardson for leaving the court—a decision that the NCAA's chief rules interpreter would label a mistake. Nonetheless, Texas appeared to have the game in hand—leading by three, after Blanks made two free throws—until Arkansas's Lee Mayberry, the national leader in three-point field goal percentage, made a contested 30-foot shot with four seconds remaining to tie the game at 86–86 and send the game into overtime. Richardson then returned to the court, eliciting a resounding chorus of boos from the crowd, and Arkansas outscored Texas 17–10 in the overtime period to claim the win. Two losses to Houston left Texas with a 12–4 record and third-place finish in conference play. The Longhorns added wins against Rhode Island—the team Penders had coached before being hired by Texas—and DePaul during the regular season. Against Rhode Island, Travis Mays surpassed Ron Baxter's career scoring total to become the then-leading scorer in UT history. After their third win that season over Texas A&M in the SWC Tournament, the Longhorns would fall to Houston for the third time, 89–86. At 21–8, Texas was awarded a No. 10 seed in the NCAA Tournament. After an easy 100–88 win over the No. 7-seed Georgia Bulldogs, the Longhorns upset Gene Keady's No. 2-seeded Purdue Boilermakers, 73–72, to advance to the Sweet Sixteen for the first time in 18 seasons. With a come-from-behind 102–89 win against the 28–4 Xavier Musketeers—in which Blanks, Mays, and Wright combined for 86 points—Texas advanced to the Elite Eight for the first time in 43 years to face its SWC archrival, the Arkansas Razorbacks, for the third time that season. Trailing by 16 points with 12 minutes remaining, the Longhorns mounted a comeback that fell just short, falling 88–85 as Travis Mays' last-second three-point attempt came off the rim. Mays finished the season as the Southwest Conference's all-time leading scorer, with 2,279 career points. Texas was ranked No. 12 in the post-Tournament Coaches Poll, matching the 1962–63 team for the highest end-of-season poll ranking in program history.

Mays and Blanks having been selected in the first round of the 1990 NBA draft, the Longhorns entered the 1990–91 season without two-thirds of the Elite Eight team's "BMW scoring machine." Even so, Texas received a preseason AP ranking of No. 22, and Penders' third team finished with a 23–9 overall record, advancing to the NCAA tournament and finishing with 23 or more wins for the third consecutive year. After opening with a win over Florida in Gainesville, Texas fell to No. 20 LSU in Baton Rouge, 101–87, and No. 16 OU in Austin, 96–88. Texas remained ranked until losing to No. 17 Georgia in Athens three weeks later. The Longhorns would defeat Steve Fisher's Michigan Wolverines, 76–74, and fall to a Tournament-bound Arizona State team, 89–82, before beginning conference play. After a 101–89 road loss to No. 2 Arkansas, Texas won ten straight games—nine over SWC opponents and one over DePaul—to Texas resurface in the AP Poll for one week in mid-February at No. 24. Penders finally ended both a personal and program seven-game losing streak to Arkansas in the final game of the conference regular season with the Longhorns' 99–86 win over the No. 3 Razorbacks in Austin, which gave Texas a 13–3 record and second-place finish in conference play. Texas would fall to Arkansas six days later in the SWC Tournament final—the last meeting between the Longhorns and the SEC-bound Razorbacks as conference archrivals. Texas nonetheless ended the season ranked No. 23 in the final AP Poll, for the Longhorns' first appearance in the final AP Poll since the 1978 NIT Championship team, and for only the second time in program history. Texas received a No. 5 seed in the 1991 NCAA Tournament, and the Longhorns would advance from the first round for the third consecutive year before falling 84–76 to fourth-seeded St. John's in the second round, which made 61 percent of its shots—and 71.4 percent of its first-half shots—while holding Texas to just 40 percent in field-goal percentage.

While the departure of Arkansas would hasten the demise of the SWC altogether in the longer term, it immediately consigned the conference—one not regarded as a significant player in college basketball for several decades—to virtual irrelevance in the college basketball landscape. Texas would play just three games against ranked conference opponents—all against the same team, and all occurring in the same season—in the remaining five seasons of the league's existence. Houston was the only remaining program that had resided among the nation's elite in recent years, but the Guy Lewis era had ended six years prior, and UH had only advanced to the NCAA Tournament twice—winning no games on either occasion—since its famed "Phi Slama Jama" teams had reached three consecutive Final Fours and two national championship games from 1982 to 1984. Penders' revived Texas program, by default, became the weakened SWC's bell cow, winning or sharing three of the final five SWC championships.

Texas quickly took advantage of Arkansas's absence, as Penders' 1991–92 team finished with a 23–12 overall record, for his fourth consecutive season of 23 or more wins, and a share of the SWC championship. Although Texas had lost leading scorer and eventual second-round NBA draft pick Joey Wright and first-team all-SWC forward and second-leading scorer Locksley Collie to graduation, the Longhorns added transfer guard and eventual first-round draft pick B. J. Tyler and freshman guard Terrence Rencher, a prolific scorer who would receive first-team all-SWC honors as a freshman and hold several program and conference records by the end of his senior year. The Longhorns opened the season with wins over Washington and Princeton in the Preseason NIT in New York City, before falling to No. 18 Georgia Tech and No. 24 Pittsburgh in the semifinal and third-place games by scores of 120–107 and 91–87, respectively. Texas defeated non-conference opponents Clemson and Georgia over the course of the season, but fell to No. 17 Oklahoma in Norman, 109–106; No. 8 Connecticut in Austin, 94–77; unranked UTEP in El Paso, 92–88; unranked LSU in New Orleans by a score of 84–83; and unranked Rhode Island in Providence by a score of 92–79. The Longhorns nonetheless compiled an 11–3 conference record—losing road contests to TCU, Baylor, and Rice—to share the SWC championship with Houston. Texas defeated Texas A&M and Texas Tech in the SWC Tournament to advance to the final against Houston. Despite having won both regular season games against the Cougars, the Longhorns were uncompetitive in a 91–72 loss in their third contest. Texas was subsequently selected as a No. 8 seed in the NCAA tournament. The Longhorns lost to the Iowa Hawkeyes in the opening game by a score of 98–92, marking the only time in eight first-round NCAA Tournament contests under Penders that Texas would fail to advance to the second round.

Following 95 wins in Penders' first four seasons at Texas—with never fewer than 23 wins in a single season—an injury-plagued 1992–93 season saw Texas struggle to an 11–17 overall record and a 4–10 record and seventh-place finish in the eight-team SWC. Point guard B. J. Tyler—a key offensive player both as a scorer and as a facilitator, having averaged 18.3 points and 6.5 assists as a sophomore in 1991–92—would miss the majority of the season. Forward-center Albert Burditt—who led the 1991–92 team in rebounds and blocks—would average 14.9 points, 14.1 rebounds, and 4.2 blocks per contest in the 1992–93 season, but would be limited by injury to playing in only 12 games. Following a 63–53 win over Princeton in the first game in a four-team tournament in Charlotte, North Carolina, the Longhorns suffered one of the most lopsided losses in school history to Dean Smith's No. 7 and eventual national champion North Carolina Tar Heels, 104–68. Texas fell to Utah in Salt Lake City, 87–76, defeated Illinois in Austin, 89–72, and suffered an 85–76 loss to No. 15 Oklahoma in the All-College Tournament before beginning conference play. Texas began 0–4 in SWC play and suffered four home losses among its 10 total conference defeats. In the course of the conference season, the Longhorns lost to unranked non-conference opponents LSU in a neutral-site game, Georgia in Athens, and Virginia Commonwealth (VCU) in Austin by scores of 84–81, 78–70, and 66–60, respectively. Texas defeated Rice in the SWC Tournament before losing to Houston in the semifinals to end the season.

Despite the disastrous 1992–93 season, Texas returned a healthy roster deep with talent and experience for the 1993–94 season. Point guard B. J. Tyler, the future 20th overall pick in the forthcoming 1994 NBA draft, and Albert Burditt, future second-round selection in the 1994 Draft, returned in full health (Tyler after missing the first four games) after each having missed the majority of the previous season. Texas was not ranked in the preseason polls, but the potential for significant improvement was evident. Prior to the beginning of the season, sportswriter Gene Wojciechowski labeled the 1993–94 Longhorns a Final Four candidate, opining that Tyler, Burditt, and Terrence Rencher were the three best players in the SWC. With Tyler still absent, Texas struggled in its first four games, narrowly defeating Nebraska in Lincoln, 78–75, and losing a road contest to LSU and a home game against Florida by scores of 86–66 and 76–68, respectively. The Longhorns' struggles continued, as Texas fell 96–86 to No. 16 Connecticut in Storrs and 86–61 to Rick Pitino's Kentucky Wildcats in Maui to post a 2–4 record in its first six games. Texas won its final game in Maui against Notre Dame before facing Oklahoma in Austin. Against Oklahoma, the Longhorns were finally able to end a nine-game program losing streak (extending back to 1979) and a five-game losing streak under Penders, defeating the Sooners 87–75 in Austin. The Longhorns avenged the previous season's loss to Utah with a 93–91, double-overtime home win over Rick Majerus's Utes before losing a closely contested game at Illinois, 83–78. After losing its first SWC game, Texas won 18 of its next 19 games in the regular season and in winning the SWC Tournament, with its only loss coming in double-overtime to Texas Tech in Lubbock, 128–125, and with its wins coming by an average of 22.1 points (and only once by fewer than 12). The Longhorns finished the SWC Tournament with a 25–7 overall record, a 12–2 conference record and outright SWC championship, and a No. 20 ranking in the final AP Poll. Texas received a No. 6 seed in the NCAA tournament and defeated Western Kentucky by a score of 91–77 to advance to a second-round contest against third-seeded Michigan, national runner-up the preceding two years. The Longhorns lost a close game to the Wolverines, 84–79, who would advance to the Elite Eight before falling to eventual national champion Arkansas, which defeated Michigan by the second-narrowest margin of its six NCAA tournament wins in 1994. Texas finished the season with a 26–8 overall record, matching Jack Gray's 1946–47 Final Four team and Abe Lemons' 1978 NIT Championship team for most wins in program history. Albert Burditt earned first-team all-SWC honors for the 1993–94 season. B. J. Tyler was recognized as the Southwest Conference Player of the Year and became the first Texas men's basketball player to receive All-American honors since LaSalle Thompson in 1982.

Penders resigned on April 3, 1998, following a scandal involving the unlawful release of player Luke Axtell's grades to the media. Longhorn players Axtell, Chris Mihm, Gabe Muoneke, and Bernard Smith had met with Texas Athletic Director DeLoss Dodds "to say that they had lost faith in Penders and his program."

In ten years at Texas, Penders' teams appeared in eight NCAA Men's Division I Basketball Championship NCAA Tournaments, advancing past the first round in all but one appearance. Penders finished as the then-winningest coach (by win total) in program history, with an overall record of 208–110 (.654).

=== Rick Barnes era (1998–2015) ===
Logo for the 100 years of Longhorns basketball, released in 2006.

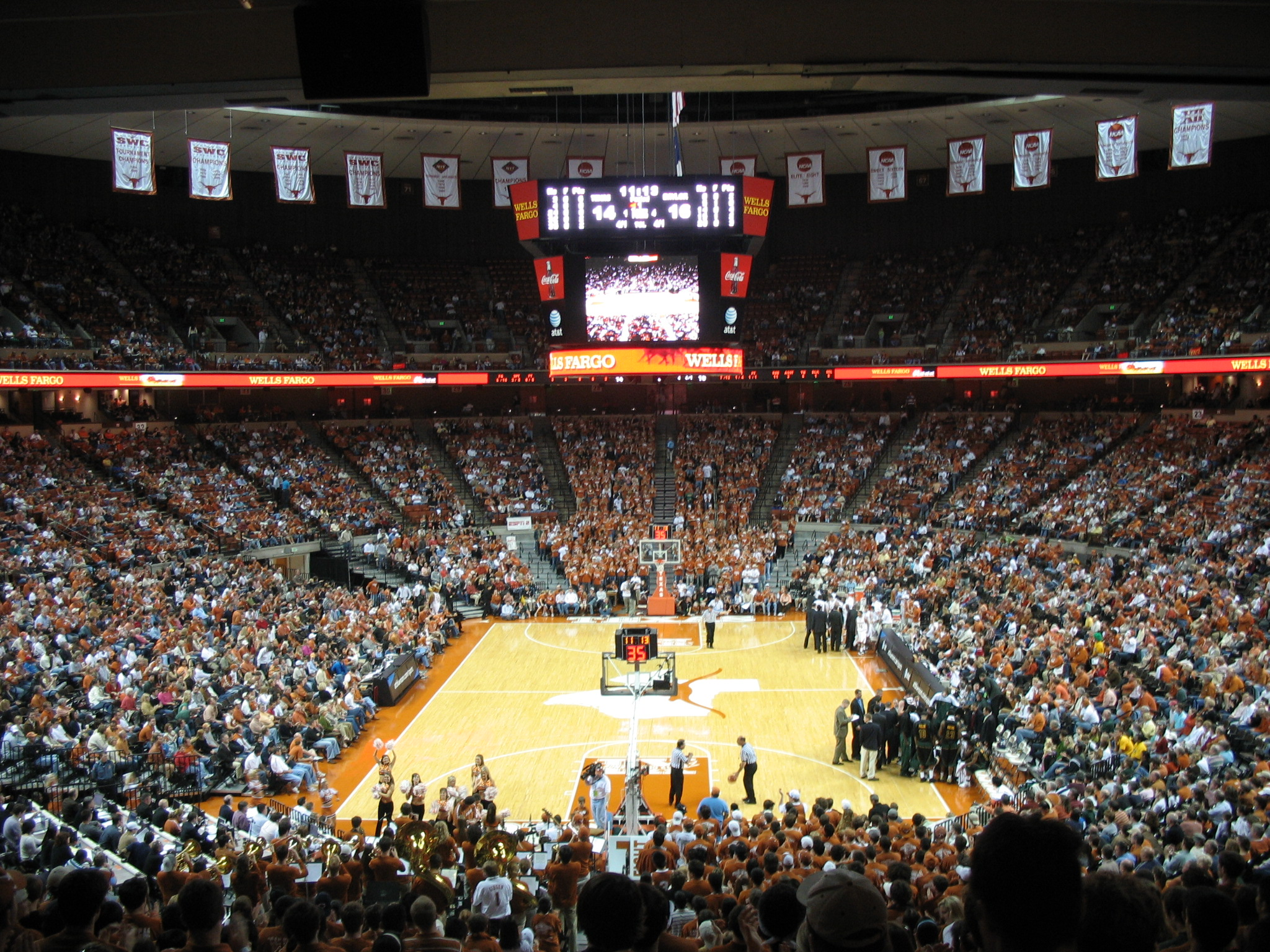
The Frank Erwin Center during a UT basketball game.

Hired as the twenty-third men's basketball coach in Texas history on April 12, 1998, Rick Barnes left Clemson University to take over a Texas program coming off of a losing season and "in disarray" following Tom Penders' resignation.

Despite playing with just seven scholarship players for the majority of the 1998–99 season—and opening the season with a 3–8 record—Barnes engineered one of the greatest midseason turnarounds in school history. The Longhorns won 16 of their final 21 games, posting a 13–3 record in conference play and winning the school's first regular season Big 12 Conference championship by a two-game margin. Texas finished the year with a record of 19–13, earning with a No. 7 seed in the NCAA tournament.

In 2002, Texas advanced to the NCAA Sweet Sixteen for the first time since the 1996–97 season, and for only the third time since the expansion of the tournament to 64 participants in 1985. The 2003 Longhorn basketball team matched the school record for most basketball victories in a season with their 26–7 mark and advanced to the NCAA tournament Final Four round for the first time in 56 years, and for the third time in school history. Along the way, Texas earned its highest ranking in school history in both the Associated Press and the ESPN/USA Today polls (No. 2 in both polls on Dec. 2, 2002) and received its first No. 1 seed in the NCAA Tournament. Sophomore point guard T. J. Ford became the first UT male player to earn the Naismith and Wooden Awards as college basketball's National Player of the Year in 2003.

Despite the early departure of Ford to the NBA as the eighth overall pick (Milwaukee Bucks), Texas compiled a 25–8 overall record in 2004 and advanced to the Sweet Sixteen round for a school-record third consecutive year. The four senior starters on the 2004 team graduated as the winningest class in school history (98 wins) to that point. In 2006, the Longhorns recorded the program's first 30-win season (30–7), claimed a share of the Big 12 Conference regular season championship, received a No. 2 seed in the NCAA tournament, and advanced to the Elite Eight (Texas fell to LSU in overtime), marking the fourth time in five years that Texas had advanced to at least the NCAA Sweet Sixteen. The 2006 class, which finished with 101 wins in four years, bested the 2004 class's mark of 98 wins to become the then-winningest class in the history of Longhorn basketball.

The 2005–06 season also marked the hundredth anniversary of basketball at UT. Special logos were placed on the uniforms to commemorate this anniversary.

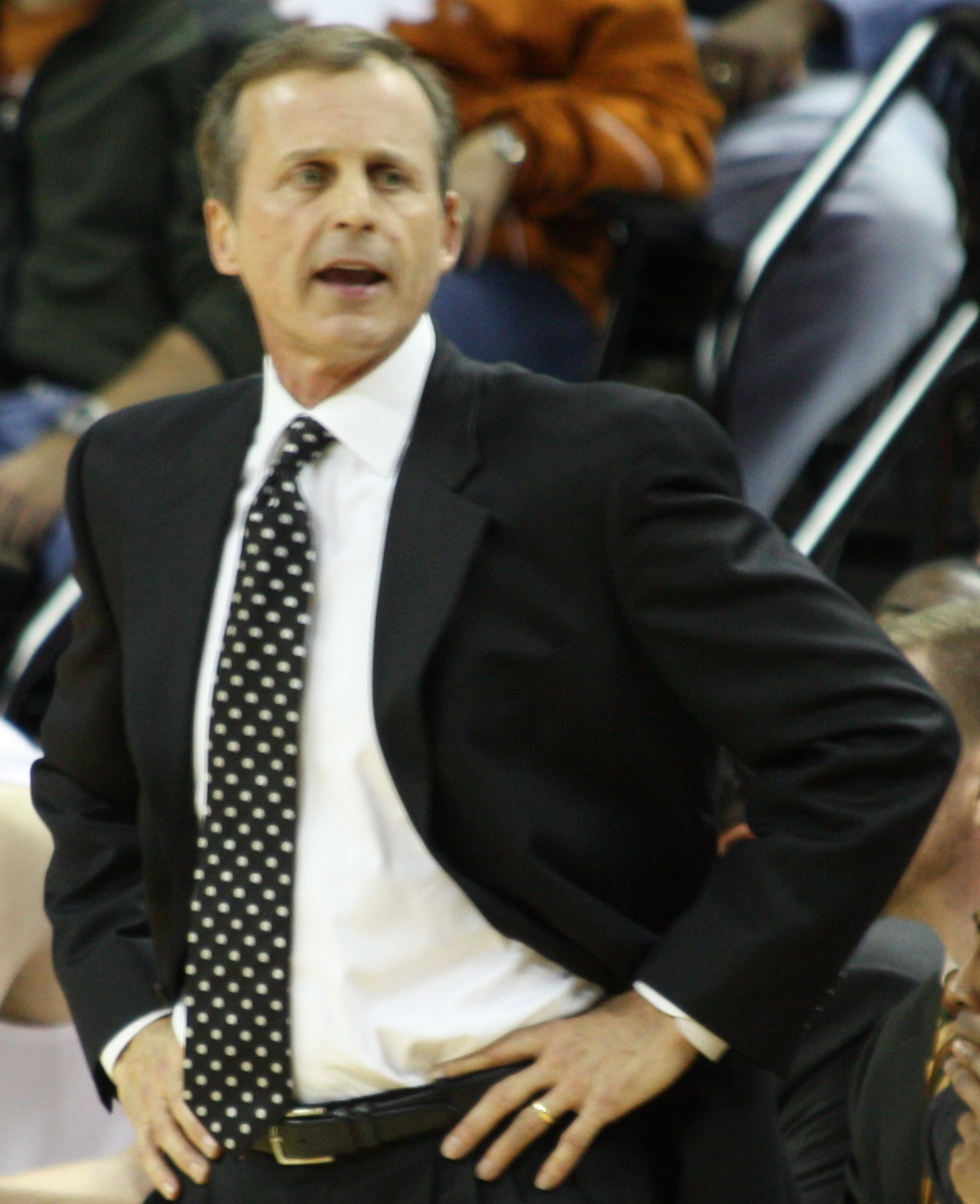
Rick Barnes in 2009

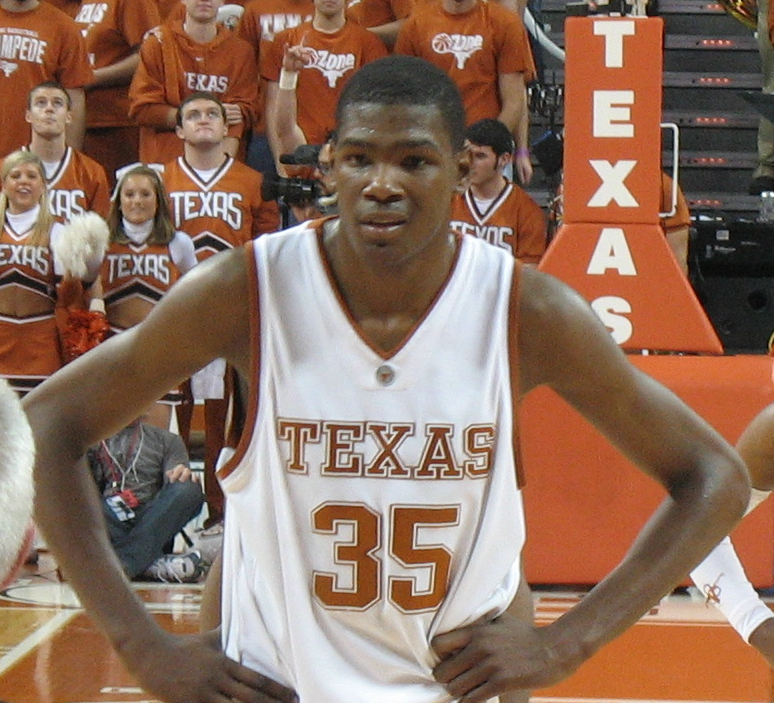
Kevin Durant (2007)

In 2006, the Longhorns introduced blue-chip recruit and future NBA superstar Kevin Durant to Austin. A recruiting class which included in-state talents such as Damion James and D. J. Augustin helped garner unforeseen levels of hype and scrutiny for the Texas basketball program. Durant's spectacular lone season at Texas resulted in his receiving unanimous National Player of the Year honors. The Longhorns, however, saw their season end at the hands of the USC Trojans in the second round of the 2007 NCAA tournament. Durant became the No. 2 overall pick in the 2007 NBA draft by the former Seattle SuperSonics, and was the 2014 NBA Most Valuable Player with the Oklahoma City Thunder.

In the 2009 NCAA tournament, Texas earned a No. 7 seed in the East Region. The Longhorns defeated the Minnesota Golden Gophers in the first round by a score of 76–62 behind the sharp shooting A.J. Abrams. The Longhorns' season came to a close with a 74–69 second-round loss at the hands of the Duke Blue Devils. The 2009 graduating class finished with 109 wins, besting the 2006 class's mark of 101 wins to become what remains the winningest class in school history.

During the 2009 recruiting cycle, Texas acquired top-tier prospects Avery Bradley and Jordan Hamilton. Partnered with veteran Damion James, center Dexter Pittman and a solid stable of guards, the Longhorns achieved their first-ever No. 1 ranking in 2010, roaring to a 17–0 start. Texas' fortunes turned upside-down with a 71–62 loss on the road to Kansas State and the ensuing 88–74 loss to Connecticut, beginning a 7–10 finish and raising the pressure for Barnes' Texas teams to reach over the hump, a recurring theme in the head coach's final six seasons in Austin. More of the same occurred in 2011, when Texas garnered two elite prospects in Canadians Tristan Thompson and Cory Joseph and had a similar scorching (23–3) start—only to lose the league to Kansas again and fall in the second round of the NCAA tournament to the Arizona Wildcats. Bradley left the program for the NBA in 2010, and Hamilton, Thompson, and Joseph followed suit in 2011.

In the 2012–13 season, Barnes' Longhorns finished 16–18 and missed their first NCAA tournament since 1997–98—the season prior to Barnes' arrival. This began a slow, yet cascading trend by fans and media to replace what had become Texas' winningest basketball coach. Not much change was expected, but turbulence within the Texas athletic department ensued following Dodds' retirement in 2013. New UT Athletic Director Steve Patterson set out to dramatically change the entire Longhorn program, with the resignation of popular football coach Mack Brown following the 2013 football season. Fans and media began to speculate that Barnes' job was at similar risk; even in recruiting—seen as Barnes' specialty—the program could not capture much of the elite Texas talent that had begun to emerge in recent seasons.

After a 2013–14 season in which the Horns defied very low expectations by finishing with a 24–11 record, tying for third place in the Big 12, and reaching the NCAA tournament, Barnes was named Big 12 Coach of the Year, and calls for his job tempered again. The 2014–15 season began with raised expectations from Longhorns fans and media, especially with the signing of top-ranked Dallas-area center Myles Turner. The Horns were ranked as high as No. 6 in the AP and coaches polls, yet only managed to finish sixth in the Big 12 in a very competitive season of conference play. The 20–14 Longhorns' loss to Butler in the opening round of the NCAA tournament marked the final game coached by Barnes at the university. After declining to meet Patterson's demand that he fire his assistants in order to save his job, Barnes was removed from his post as head basketball coach in late March.

=== Shaka Smart era (2015–2021) ===
After many days of deliberation and speculation over who would fill Barnes' post, which included names such as Wichita State coach Gregg Marshall (who was heavily courted by Alabama), Villanova coach Jay Wright, and Virginia's Tony Bennett, Texas reached an agreement with Virginia Commonwealth head coach Shaka Smart on April 2, 2015. Smart was introduced as the 24th Texas men's basketball head coach the following day at a press conference in Austin.

The Longhorns finished 20–13 in Smart's first season, including a fourth-place finish in the Big 12 Conference. The scheduled included the school's first-ever basketball game in China - a 77–71 loss to Washington. Point guard Isaiah Taylor returned to lead the team in scoring for the second straight season, averaging 15 points per game. The Longhorns struggled at times in the season after center Cameron Ridley went down with an injured foot that caused him to miss all of conference play, returning for a brief stint in the conference tournament and in Texas' NCAA tournament game. Texas won four of its last six regular season games, including a 76–63 win over a top-five Oklahoma team in Austin, but lost in the first round of the Big 12 Conference tournament to Baylor, 75–61. In the first round of the NCAA tournament, the Longhorns lost, as a half-court shot off the backboard lifted Northern Iowa to a 75–72 win.

In 2017, the Longhorns went 11–22, finishing with their most losses since the 1983 season. Texas struggled with consistency early in the season, but after leading scorer Tevin Mack was suspended in January, the Longhorns went 4-12 the rest of the way, including seven straight losses to end the regular season. Mack, a sophomore guard, left the team and transferred to Alabama. Freshman center Jarrett Allen led Texas the rest of the way, averaging 16 points and almost 10 rebounds in Big 12 Conference play. Allen declared for the NBA draft after the season, and the Brooklyn Nets selected him with the 22nd pick of the first round.

Under Smart, the Longhorns' recruiting situation improved dramatically, with players such as Matt Coleman, Andrew Jones, Mo Bamba, Jaxson Hayes, and Greg Brown standing out for the team during that time. Texas made the NCAA tournament in 2018, losing to Nevada in the first round, followed by an NIT win in 2019. The 2019–20 season was seen as a failure until a late-season rally by the Longhorns, which arguably saved Smart's job, along with the COVID-19 pandemic which canceled the NCAA tournament that year.

In 2020–21, the Longhorns won their first Big 12 tournament title, following a strong showing in a regular season marred by COVID-19 cancellations (including the Longhorns' own semifinal against Kansas). After defeating Oklahoma State for the Big 12 title, Texas suffered arguably its most infamous loss in school history, as the third-seeded Longhorns fell, 53–52, to 14th-seeded Abilene Christian in the first round of the NCAA tournament. Smart, under duress, decamped for Marquette on March 26.

=== Chris Beard era (2021–2023) ===
On April 1, 2021, Texas Tech head basketball coach Chris Beard accepted the head coaching position at Texas. Widely considered the top candidate from the moment Smart departed, Beard is a 1995 alumnus of the University of Texas and served as student manager under Tom Penders during his time on campus.

In Beard's only full season of coaching at the school, Texas managed 22 wins and an NCAA appearance, which ended in the second round at the hands of Purdue. The 2022–23 'Horns started strongly at 7−1 before Beard was suspended in December for allegations of domestic violence.

On January 5, 2023, Beard was fired as head coach amid a felony domestic violence charge, which was later dropped as the alleged victim recanted her initial statements.

=== Rodney Terry as interim coach (2022−2023) ===
Rodney Terry, Beard's top assistant, was given the reins on an interim basis for the remainder of the season. Terry guided a senior- and transfer-heavy Longhorn team to a second-place Big 12 finish, behind perennial conference power Kansas. Silver linings in Terry's interregnum included an emphatic 75−59 victory over the Jayhawks in the final regular season game, which portended the team's eventual performance in the 2023 Big 12 tournament.

Texas would defeat Kansas in the tournament final to clinch an automatic bid in the NCAA tournament, the second time in three years this has occurred and the first tournament final win over Kansas in school history.

In the NCAA tournament the Horns would defeat Colgate, Penn State, and Xavier en route to the school's first Elite Eight appearance in 15 years; the squad would lead Miami by double-figures in the second half but ultimately fell short, 88–81. The team finished with a 22–8 record with Terry as interim coach.

=== Rodney Terry era (2023–2025) ===
On March 27, 2023, Rodney Terry agreed to a deal to become Texas's full-time Head Coach. Terry signed a 5-year, $15.3 million contract.

Terry would advance to three NCAA tournaments, two further after being named permanent head coach. He notably guided the Longhorns in the university's first season as a member of the Southeastern Conference, which yielded a narrow NCAA tournament qualification. Terry was fired by Texas in 2025 after losing an NCAA tournament First Four game to Xavier, who was coached by the man who immediately followed Terry, Sean Miller.

=== Sean Miller era (2025–present) ===
Sean Miller was named Texas head coach on March 25, 2025. He received a six-year deal to coach the Longhorns. In his first season, Coach Miller and the Longhorns made it to the Sweet Sixteen as the 11 seeded team in the West Region. The Longhorns enter the 2026-27 season with high expectations after being ranking in the Preseason AP Poll at #7.

== Facilities ==
The basketball court at Clark Field, site of UT basketball home games from 1906 to 1916

=== Clark Field (1906–12, 1914–16) ===
Clark Field, originally known as Varsity Athletic Field, was an on-campus, outdoor stadium that was the original home of the Texas Longhorns men's basketball team, as well as the Longhorn football, baseball, and track teams. The stadium opened in 1887. In its final years, the facility held 20,000 spectators.

The Texas Longhorns men's basketball team moved indoors to the new Men's Gym in 1917.

=== Ben Hur Temple (1913) ===
Ben Hur Temple in downtown Austin, site of UT basketball home games in 1913

Head coach Carl C. Taylor, seeking an indoor home venue for the basketball team, reached an agreement with the Ben Hur Temple in downtown Austin to rent the building's theater for basketball games and five hours of practice weekly for the 1913 season for $75. The building was originally constructed in 1872 as an opera house for the Turnverein, a German gymnastics, social, and cultural society, and it had been purchased in 1912 by the Shriners and Scottish Rite Masons. Basketball goals were mounted on the balcony and in front of the stage, boundary lines were drawn on the double-layer pine floor, and bleachers were erected on each side of the diminutive court, bringing seating capacity to roughly 350 people, including spectators in the balcony and on the stage.

Due to the insufficient size of the court and capacity of the theater, the off-campus location, and the added expense of renting the facility, the basketball team returned to its outdoor home at Clark Field for the 1914 to 1916 seasons.

=== Men's Gym (1917–28) ===
UT Men's Gym, the basketball team's home court from 1917 to 1928

The university constructed the Men's Gym adjacent to Clark Field to serve as the temporary home of the Texas men's basketball team pending the construction of a permanent gymnasium. Built for a total cost of $8,500, the all-wood Men's Gym measured 115' by 105' and 23' high and featured a pinewood floor, an electric scoreboard, and seating for 2,500 spectators.

The Texas men's basketball team played home games in the Men's Gym beginning with the 1917 season through the end of the 1927–28 season. On March 25, 1928, the Men's Gym caught fire and burned to the ground. While the loss of the Men's Gym advanced the timeline for the construction of a new gymnasium for men's basketball, the team would be left without an on-campus home for the following two seasons, playing instead in the gymnasiums of the Texas School for the Deaf and Austin High School before moving into the new Gregory Gymnasium for the 1930–31 season.

=== Texas School for the Deaf and Austin High School Gymnasiums (1928–30) ===
For the 1928–29 season, the university reached an agreement with the Texas School for the Deaf for the Texas men's basketball team to play its home games in TSD's recently constructed fieldhouse. The TSD fieldhouse had a seating capacity of just one-sixth of the Men's Gym, precluding the sale of tickets to the general public and requiring the use of a lottery for the allocation of tickets to students and existing season ticket holders.

Prolonged inclement weather delayed the completion of Gregory Gymnasium, originally intended to debut in the 1929–30 season with the Southwest Conference opening home game against Baylor, and, consequently, the Longhorns had to play home games away from campus for the entirety of the season. Texas played its nonconference games in the TSD Gym before moving into the recently completed 1,500-seat Austin High School Gymnasium for its five SWC home games.

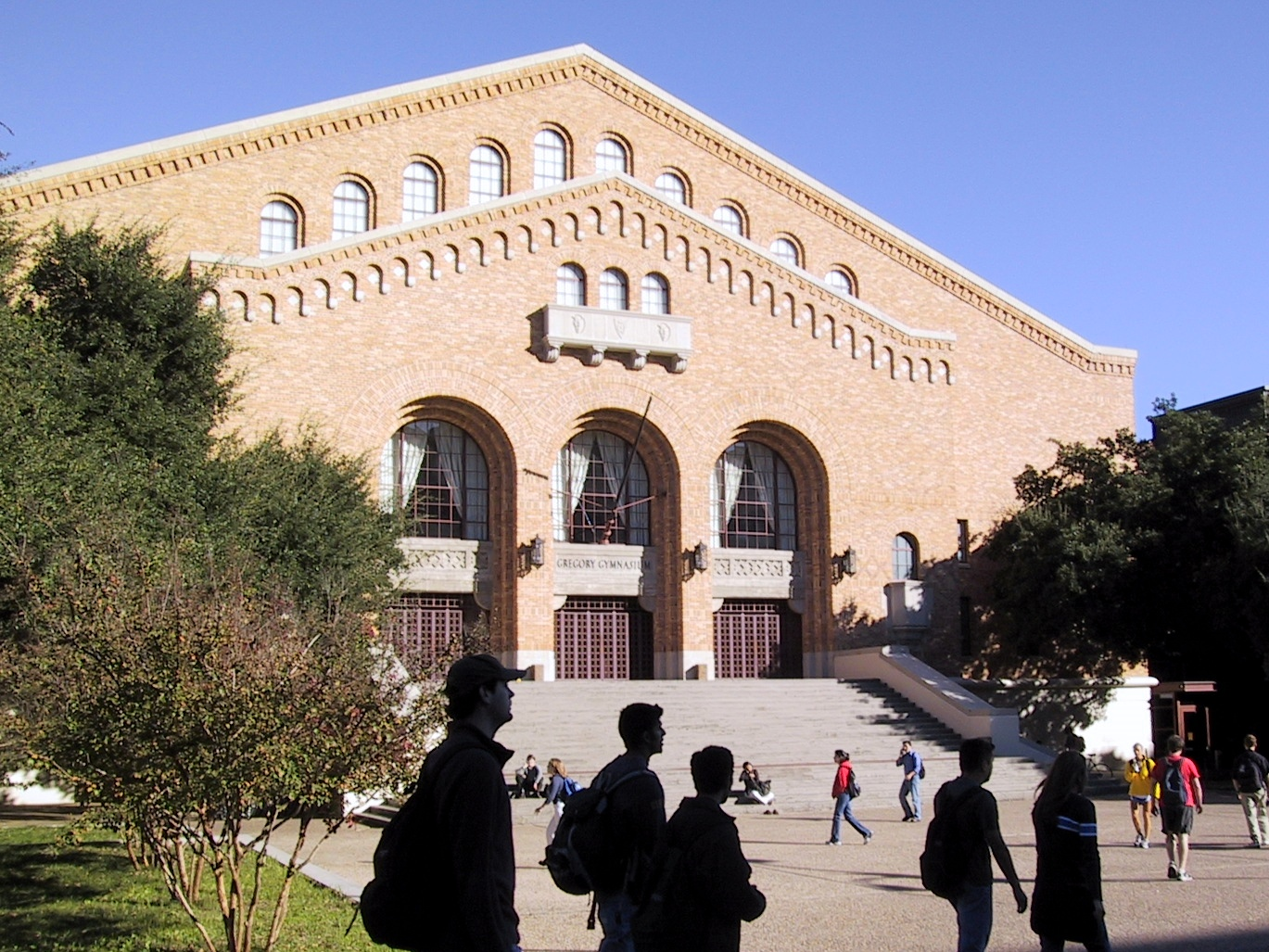
Front façade of Gregory Gymnasium

=== Gregory Gymnasium (1930–77) ===
Originally built in 1930, Gregory Gymnasium was named after its main advocate and planner, Thomas Watt Gregory. An alumnus of the university, Gregory served on the university's Board of Regents and as United States Attorney General (1914–19) before the gym was built. Gregory Gymnasium is located on the UT central campus, a short distance southeast of the UT Main Building, Tower, and Main Mall and facing west onto Speedway Avenue, the campus's central north–south street.

The Texas men's basketball team played home games in Gregory Gymnasium beginning with the 1930–31 season until moving into the Special Events Center (later renamed the Frank Erwin Center) for the 1977–78 season.

=== Frank Erwin Center (1977–2022) ===
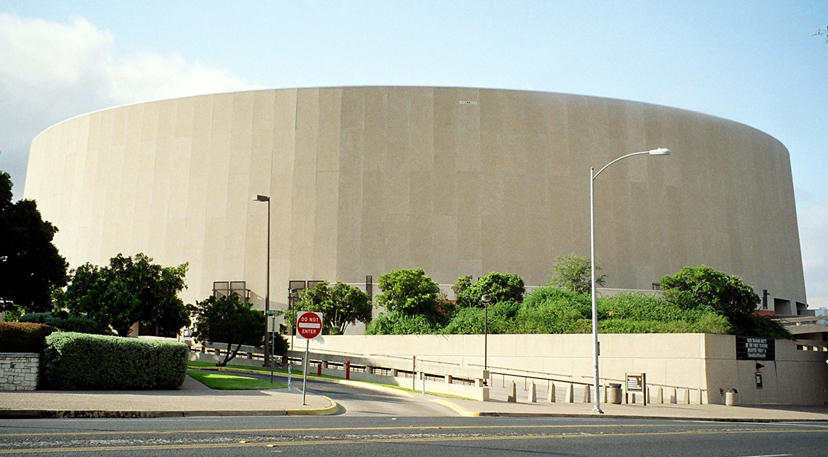
The Frank Erwin Center

The Texas men's basketball team opened the Frank Erwin Center on November 29, 1977, with an 83–76 victory over the Oklahoma Sooners. The Longhorns won their first 25 games in the Erwin Center before falling to Arkansas in February 1979.

Built for a total cost of $34 million, the building is named for former UT alumnus and Board of Regents member Frank Erwin. Originally known as the Special Events Center, the facility was renamed in 1981 to honor Erwin, who had died earlier that year. The Erwin Center is located at the southeastern corner of the UT central campus and is bounded on the east by Interstate 35.

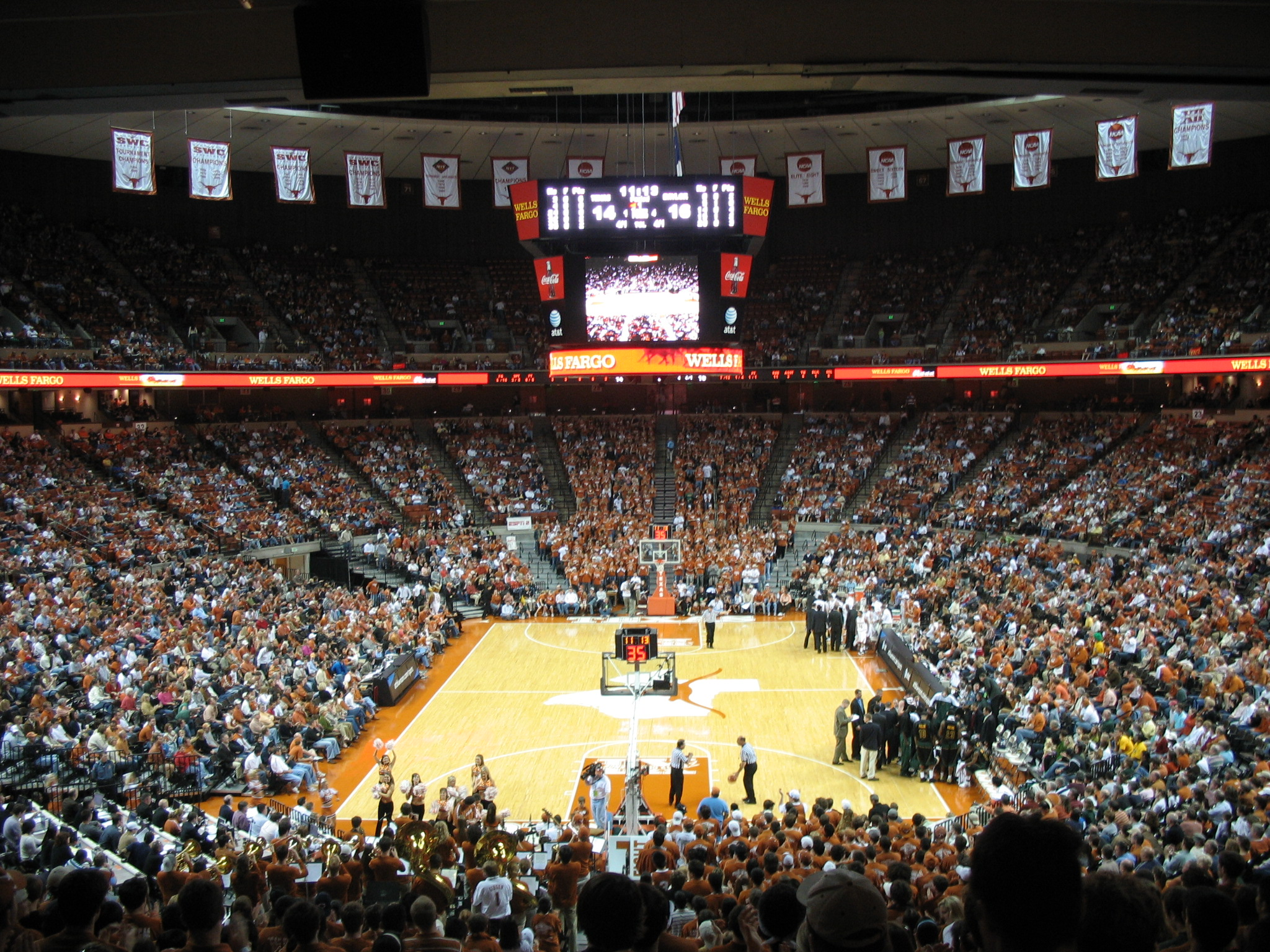
Frank Erwin Center during a UT men's basketball game

A two-level layout (the lower arena and upper mezzanine) currently accommodates up to 16,540 spectators for basketball games. UT undertook extensive renovations of the facility from 2001 to 2003 at a cost of $55 million, adding, among other things, new and renovated seating, new video and sound systems, new lighting, and 28 suites. As part of the project, UT constructed the Denton A. Cooley Pavilion, a state-of-the-art practice and training facility that sits adjacent to the Erwin Center.

The master plan released in 2013 for the university's new Dell Medical School indicated that the Erwin Center would be demolished in a later phase of construction within 6–15 years. In 2022, the Erwin Center was replaced by the Moody Center

==== Denton A. Cooley Pavilion practice and training facility (2003–2022) ====
Built during the final phase of the renovation of the Erwin Center, the Denton A. Cooley Pavilion opened in the fall of 2003. The two-level, 44,000-square-foot building sits adjacent to the Erwin Center and serves as a state-of-the-art practice and training facility for the Texas men's and women's basketball teams. The Pavilion is named for Dr. Denton A. Cooley, a UT alumnus, basketball letterman (1939–41), and pioneering heart surgeon.

The Texas men's and women's basketball teams have separate 9,000-square-foot practice court areas, each consisting of one full-court and one half-court practice area with seven basket stations. The practice facility also includes a locker room with a players' lounge, an instructional film theater, a 4,100-square-foot strength and conditioning area, an athletic training and hydrotherapy area, an academic resource and activity center, and a coaches' lounge and locker room.

The Cooley Pavilion will be demolished and replaced during the same phase of construction of the Dell Medical School as the Erwin Center.

=== Moody Center (2022–present) ===
Moody Center in 2022

Moody Center is a premier $375 million entertainment center with a seating capacity of over 15,000 guests that hosts over 150 nights of entertainment each year. Moody Center features the biggest names in the music industry while serving as the home of The University of Texas men's and woman's basketball games, family entertainment, sporting and local events.

==== Basketball, Basketball, & Rowing Training Facility (BBR) ====
To replace the Cooley Pavilion, Texas built a new basketball practice facility (BBR) adjacent to the Moody Center. This new facility includes locker rooms for both teams, a nutrition center, training room and rehab facilities, 2 full-sized practice courts, weight room, and coaches offices. It will also be combined with an on-campus practice facility for the Texas Rowing team.

== Coaching records ==
Coach	Years at UT	Total seasons	Wins	Losses	Win %	Conf. wins	Conf. losses	Conf. win %	Awards and achievements during tenure
Magnus Mainland	1906–07	2	11	5	.688	—	—	—	
W. E. Metzenthin	1909–11	3	13	14	.481	—	—	—	
J. Burton Rix	1912	1	5	1	.833	—	—	—	
Carl C. Taylor	1913	1	8	4	.667	—	—	—	
L. Theo Bellmont	1914–15, 1921–22	4	58	9	.866	28	9	.757	• Southwest Conference championship (1915) • Highest winning percentage in program history • 2 undefeated seasons (11–0 in 1914, 14–0 in 1915) • Contributed 25 wins (1914–15) to UT's 44-game winning streak (1913–17)
Roy Henderson	1916, 1918–19	3	43	8	.843	25	6	.806	• 2 Southwest Conference championships (1916, 1919) • 1 undefeated season (12–0 in 1916) • Highest conference winning percentage in program history (2 or more seasons) • Contributed 12 wins (1916) to UT's 44-game winning streak (1913–17)
Eugene Van Gent	1917	1	13	3	.813	7	1	.875	• Southwest Conference championship (1917) • Highest conference winning percentage in program history
Berry M. Whitaker	1920	1	10	6	.625	4	6	.400	
Milton Romney	1923	1	11	7	.611	9	7	.563	
E. J. "Doc"; Stewart	1924–27	4	65	27	.707	42	15	.737	• Southwest Conference championship (1924) • 1 undefeated season (23–0) (1924)
Fred Walker	1927–31	4	51	30	.630	27	21	.563	
Ed Olle	1931–34	3	49	18	.731	22	14	.611	• Southwest Conference championship (1933)
Marty Karow	1934–36	2	31	16	.660	13	11	.542	
Jack Gray	1936–42, 1945–51	12	194	97	.667	89	55	.618	• Final Four (1947) • 2 Elite Eights (1939, 1947) • 2 NCAA Tournament appearances (1939, 1947) • NIT appearance (1948) • 3 Southwest Conference championships (1939, 1947, 1951) • 1 undefeated conference season (12–0) (1947)
H. C. "Bully"; Gilstrap	1942–45	3	43	28	.606	20	16	.556	• Final Four (1943) • NCAA Tournament appearance (1943) • Southwest Conference championship (1943)
Thurman "Slue"; Hull	1951–56	5	60	58	.508	33	27	.550	• Southwest Conference championship (1954)
Marshall Hughes	1956–59	3	25	46	.352	10	30	.250	
Harold Bradley	1959–67	8	125	73	.631	73	39	.652	• 2 Sweet Sixteens (1960, 1963) • 2 NCAA Tournament appearances (1960, 1963) • 3 Southwest Conference championships (1960, 1963, 1965)
Leon Black	1967–76	9	106	121	.467	63	65	.492	• Sweet Sixteen (1972) • 2 NCAA Tournament appearances (1972, 1974) • 2 Southwest Conference championships (1972, 1974)
A. E. "Abe"; Lemons	1976–82	6	110	63	.636	58	38	.604	• NCAA Tournament appearance (1979) • NIT Championship (1978) • 2 NIT appearances (1978, 1980) • 2 Southwest Conference championships (1978, 1979) • 1 season with 25 wins or more (1978) • 2 seasons with 20 wins or more (1978, 1979) • Ranked in at least one final poll in 2 seasons (1978, 1979) • NABC National Coach of the Year (1978) • Southwest Conference Coach of the Year (1978)
Bob Weltlich	1982–88	6	77	98	.440	40	56	.417	• NIT appearance (1986) • Southwest Conference championship (1986)
Tom Penders	1988–98	10	208	110	.654	85 16	33 (SWC) 16 (Big 12)	.720.500	• Elite Eight (1990) • 2 Sweet Sixteens (1990, 1997) • 8 NCAA Tournament appearances (1989–92, 1994–97) • 3 Southwest Conference championships (1992, 1994, 1995) • 2 Southwest Conference tournament championships (1994, 1995) • 2 seasons with 25 wins or more (1989, 1994) • 7 seasons with 20 wins or more (1989–92, 1994–96) • Most wins in first year (25) for any coach in program history (1989) • Most wins in first 2 years (49) for any coach in program history (1989–90) • Most wins in first 3 years (72) for any coach in program history (1989–91) • Most wins in first 4 years (95) for any coach in program history (1989–92) • Ranked in at least one final poll in 5 seasons (1990, 1991, 1994, 1995, 1997) • 2× Southwest Conference Coach of the Year (1994, 1995)
Rick Barnes	1998–2015	17	402	180	.691	186	94	.664	• Final Four (2003) • 3 Elite Eights (2003, 2006, 2008) • 5 Sweet Sixteens (2002–04, 2006, 2008) • 16 NCAA Tournament appearances (1999–2012, 2014, 2015) • Highest NCAA seed (1) in program history (2003) • 3 Big 12 Conference championships (1999, 2006, 2008) • 2 seasons with 30 wins or more (2006, 2008) • 7 seasons with 25 wins or more (2001, 2003, 2004, 2006–2008, 2011) • 15 seasons with 20 wins or more (2000–2012, 2014, 2015) • School-record 13 consecutive 20-win seasons (2000–2012) • Most wins (31) in one season in program history (2008) • Most wins for any 2-year period (56) in program history (2007–08) • Most wins for any 3-year period (86) in program history (2006–08) • Most wins for any 4-year period (109) in program history (2006–09) • Most wins (254) for any 10-year period in program history (2002–11) • Highest win % (.734) for any 10-year period in program history (2002–11) during Tournament era • No. 10 nationally in win % for decade of 2000–09 (.732) • 2 top-five poll finishes (2003, 2008) • 5 top-ten poll finishes (2003, 2004, 2006, 2008, 2011) • 4× Big 12 Coach of the Year (1999, 2003, 2008, 2014) • 5× NABC District 9 Coach of the Year (1999, 2001, 2003, 2008, 2014) • 4× USBWA District VII Coach of the Year (1999, 2001, 2003, 2011) • John R. Wooden Legends of Coaching Award recipient (2009) • Most wins in program history (402)
Shaka Smart	2015–2021	6	109	86	.559	51	56	.477	• 3 NCAA Tournament appearances (2016, 2018, 2021) • NIT Championship (2019) • NIT appearance (2019) • Big 12 Conference tournament championship (2021) • 2 seasons with 20 wins or more (2016, 2019)
Chris Beard	2021–2022	2	29	13	.690	10	8	.556	• NCAA Tournament appearance (2022) • 1 season with 20 wins or more (2022)
Rodney Terry	2022–2025	2	62	37	.626	27	27	.500	• Elite Eight (2023) • Sweet Sixteen (2023) • 3 NCAA Tournament appearances (2023, 2024, 2025) • Big 12 Conference tournament championship (2023) • 2 seasons with 20 wins or more (2023, 2024) • Sporting News National Coach of the Year (2023)
Sean Miller	2025–present	1	21	15	.583	9	9	.500	• Sweet 16 (2026) • 1 NCAA Tournament appearances (2026)

== Championships ==
Conference championships

Conference championships
Total	Type	Year
3	Big 12 Conference championship (regular season)	1999, 2006*, 2008*
2	Big 12 Conference tournament championship	2021, 2023
22	Southwest Conference championship (regular season)	1915, 1916, 1917, 1919, 1924, 1933, 1939, 1943*, 1947, 1951*, 1954*, 1960, 1963, 1965*, 1972*, 1974, 1978*, 1979*, 1986*, 1992*, 1994, 1995*
2	Southwest Conference tournament championship	1994, 1995
*Denotes shared conference championship
29 total conference championships

Invitational tournament championships

Invitational tournament championships
Total	Type	Year
2	National Invitation Tournament champion	1978, 2019
1	Legends Classic champion	2024*
1	Maui Invitational Tournament champion	2020*
1	2K Sports Classic champion	2014*
2	CBE Hall of Fame Classic champion	2005*, 2009*
*Denotes early-season invitational tournament
7 invitational championships

== Postseason ==
=== NCAA tournament results ===
Texas has appeared in the NCAA tournament on 40 occasions (ninth-most appearances all time, and second only to Kentucky among Southeastern Conference members). The Longhorns' overall record in the Tournament is 43–42, with one loss vacated by NCAA action taken against a Longhorn opponent.

Year	Seed	Round	Opponent	Result
1939		Elite Eight; Regional 3rd Place Game	Oregon; Utah State	L 41–56; L 49–51
1943		Elite Eight; Final Four	Washington; Wyoming	W 59–55; L 54–58
1947		Elite Eight; Final Four; National 3rd Place Game	Wyoming; Oklahoma; CCNY	W 42–40; L 54–55; W 54–50
1960		Sweet Sixteen; Regional 3rd Place Game	Kansas; DePaul	L 81–90; L 61–67
1963		First Round; Sweet Sixteen; Regional 3rd Place Game	Texas Western; Cincinnati; Oklahoma City	W 65–47; L 68–73; W 90–83
1972		First Round; Sweet Sixteen; Regional 3rd Place Game	Houston; Kansas State; Southwestern Louisiana	W 85–74; L 55–66; L 70–100(vacated)
1974		First Round	Creighton	L 61–77
1979	(4)	Second Round	(5) Oklahoma	L 76–90
1989	(11)	First Round; Second Round	(6) Georgia Tech (3) Missouri	W 76–70; L 89–108
1990	(10)	First Round; Second Round; Sweet Sixteen; Elite Eight	(7) Georgia (2) Purdue (6) Xavier (4) Arkansas	W 100–88; W 73–72; W 102–89; L 85–88
1991	(5)	First Round; Second Round	(12) Saint Peter's (4) St. John's	W 73–65; L 76–84
1992	(8)	First Round	(9) Iowa	L 92–98
1994	(6)	First Round; Second Round	(11) Western Kentucky (3) Michigan	W 91–77; L 79–84
1995	(11)	First Round; Second Round	(6) Oregon (3) Maryland	W 90–73; L 68–82
1996	(10)	First Round; Second Round	(7) Michigan (2) Wake Forest	W 80–76; L 62–65
1997	(10)	First Round; Second Round; Sweet Sixteen	(7) Wisconsin (15) Coppin State (6) Louisville	W 71–58; W 82–81; L 63–78
1999	(7)	First Round	(10) Purdue	L 54–58
2000	(5)	First Round; Second Round	(12) Indiana State (4) LSU	W 77–61; L 67–72

Year	Seed	Round	Opponent	Result
2001	(6)	First Round	(11) Temple	L 65–79
2002	(6)	First Round; Second Round; Sweet Sixteen	(11) Boston College (3) Mississippi State (2) Oregon	W 70–57; W 68–64; L 70–72
2003	(1)	First Round; Second Round; Sweet Sixteen; Elite Eight; Final Four	(16) UNC Asheville (9) Purdue (5) Connecticut (7) Michigan State (3) Syracuse	W 82–61; W 77–67; W 82–78; W 85–76; L 84–95
2004	(3)	First Round; Second Round; Sweet Sixteen	(14) Princeton (6) North Carolina (7) Xavier	W 66–49; W 78–75; L 71–79
2005	(8)	First Round	(9) Nevada	L 57–61
2006	(2)	First Round; Second Round; Sweet Sixteen; Elite Eight	(15) Penn (10) NC State (6) West Virginia (4) LSU	W 60–52; W 75–54; W 74–71; L 60–70^{OT}
2007	(4)	First Round; Second Round	(13) New Mexico State (5) USC	W 79–67; L 68–87
2008	(2)	First Round; Second Round; Sweet Sixteen; Elite Eight	(15) Austin Peay (7) Miami (FL) (3) Stanford (1) Memphis	W 74–54; W 75–72; W 82–62; L 66–85
2009	(7)	First Round; Second Round	(10) Minnesota (2) Duke	W 76–62; L 69–74
2010	(8)	First Round	(9) Wake Forest	L 80–81^{OT}
2011*	(4)	Second Round*; Third Round*	(13) Oakland (5) Arizona	W 85–81; L 69–70
2012*	(11)	Second Round*	(6) Cincinnati	L 59–65
2014*	(7)	Second Round*; Third Round*	(10) Arizona State (2) Michigan	W 87–85; L 65–79
2015*	(11)	Second Round*	(6) Butler	L 48–56
2016	(6)	First Round	(11) Northern Iowa	L 72–75
2018	(10)	First Round	(7) Nevada	L 83–87^{OT}
2021	(3)	First Round	(14) Abilene Christian	L 52–53
2022	(6)	First Round; Second Round	(11) Virginia Tech (3) Purdue	W 81–73; L 71–81
2023	(2)	First Round; Second Round; Sweet Sixteen; Elite Eight	(15) Colgate (10) Penn State (3) Xavier (5) Miami (FL)	W 81–61; W 71–66; W 83–71; L 81–88
2024	(7)	First Round; Second Round	(10) Colorado State (2) Tennessee	W 56–44; L 58–62
2025	(11)	First Four	(11) Xavier	L 80–86
2026	(11)	First Four; First Round; Second Round; Sweet Sixteen	(11) NC State (6) BYU (3) Gonzaga (2) Purdue	W 68–66; W 79–71; W 74–68; L 79-77

*Following the introduction of the "First Four" round in 2011, the Round of 64 and Round of 32 were referred to as the Second Round and Third Round, respectively, from 2011 to 2015.

=== NCAA tournament seeding history ===
The NCAA began seeding the Tournament in 1979. Texas has appeared in 33 of the 47 seeded Tournaments (and in 32 of the last 37).

Years →	'79	'89	'90	'91	'92	'94	'95	'96	'97	'99	'00	'01	'02	'03	'04	'05	'06	'07	'08	'09	'10	'11	'12	'14	'15	'16	'18	'21	'22	'23	'24	'25	'26
Seeds →	4	11	10	5	8	6	11	10	10	7	5	6	6	1	3	8	2	4	2	7	8	4	11	7	11	6	10	3	6	2	7	11	11

=== NIT results ===
The Longhorns have appeared in the National Invitation Tournament (NIT) five times. Their combined record is 11–3. Texas won the NIT Championship in 1978 and 2019.

Year	Round	Opponent	Result
1948	Quarterfinals	NYU	L 43–45
1978	First Round; Quarterfinals; Semifinals; Final	Temple; Nebraska; Rutgers; NC State	W 72–58; W 67–48; W 96–76; W 101–93
1980	First Round; Second Round	Saint Joseph's; Southwestern Louisiana	W 70–61; L 76–77
1986	First Round; Second Round	New Mexico; Ohio State	W 69–66; L 65–71
2019	First Round; Second Round; Quarterfinals; Semifinals; Final	South Dakota State; Xavier; Colorado; TCU; Lipscomb	W 79–73; W 78–76^{OT} W 68–55; W 58–44; W 81–66

=== CBI results ===
The Longhorns have appeared in the College Basketball Invitational (CBI) one time. Their record is 0–1.

Year	Round	Opponent	Result
2013	First Round	Houston	L 72–73

== Polls ==
Texas has been ranked in at least one of the final AP or coaches polls in 21 seasons since their introduction prior to the 1948–49 and 1950–51 seasons, respectively. The Longhorns have recorded seven top-ten finishes and three top-five finishes in one or more of the final polls. Ten of Rick Barnes' teams, five of Tom Penders' teams, two of Abe Lemons' teams, and two of Harold Bradley's teams finished the season ranked. As of April 1, 2025, Texas teams have been ranked in 318 of 1300 total weekly AP Polls (24.5%) since the inception of the poll in the 1948–49 season (31st all-time in AP Poll appearances), and in 361 of 1286 total weekly coaches polls (28.1%) since the inception of the poll in the 1950–51 season.

Texas in the AP poll (1949–present)
Season	Preseason ranking	Peak ranking	Weeks ranked	Final AP poll
1948–49	—	20	1/8	—
1977–78	—	12	9/17	17
1978–79	6	6	12/17	—
1981–82	—	5	4/16	—
1990–91	22	22	8/17	23
1993–94	—	20	2/18	20
1995–96	—	23	1/18	—
1996–97	16	13	12/18	—
1997–98	22	22	1/18	—
1998–99	—	22	1/18	—
1999–2000	21	9	19/19	15
2000–01	—	18	6/19	18
2001–02	23	23	2/18	—
2002–03	4	2	19/19	5
2003–04	12	6	19/19	12
2004–05	16	10	14/19	—
2005–06	2	2	19/19	9
2006–07	21	11	9/19	11
2007–08	15	4	20/20	7
2008–09	7	5	14/19	—
2009–10	3	1	16/19	—
2010–11	—	3	17/19	8
2013–14	—	19	5/20	—
2014–15	10	6	13/19	—
2015–16	—	23	5/19	—
2016–17	21	21	3/19	—
2018–19	—	17	1/20	—
2019–20	—	22	1/20	—
2020–21	19	4	17/17	9
2021–22	5	5	18/19	25
2022–23	12	2	19/19	5
2023–24	18	12	10/21	—
2024–25	19	19	1/20	—

Texas in the coaches poll (1951–present)
Season	Preseason ranking	Peak ranking	Weeks ranked	Final coaches poll
1953–54	—	18	1/14	—
1959–60	—	13	3/14	13
1962–63	—	11	9/16	12
1963–64	10	8	3/15	—
1977–78	—	12	9/15	19
1978–79	7	7	11/14	15
1981–82	—	5	4/15	—
1990–91	21	19	10/18	—
1991–92	25	23	2/19	—
1992–93	18	18	2/18	—
1993–94	—	24	2/19	24
1994–95	—	21	2/18	24
1996–97	15	11	12/18	20
1997–98	24	24	1/18	—
1998–99	—	22	4/18	—
1999–2000	22	11	19/19	21
2000–01	—	17	10/19	—
2001–02	22	18	5/20	18
2002–03	5	2	20/20	3
2003–04	11	6	19/19	10
2004–05	15	9	13/19	—
2005–06	3	2	20/20	9
2006–07	19	16	12/20	16
2007–08	16	5	21/21	5
2008–09	8	5	15/20	23
2009–10	3	1	17/20	—
2010–11	25	2	20/20	16
2012–13	24	24	2/20	—
2013–14	—	17	4/21	—
2014–15	10	7	12/20	—
2015–16	—	22	6/20	—
2016–17	22	21	3/20	—
2018–19	—	17	1/20	—
2019–20	—	22	1/19	—
2020–21	22	4	17/17	21
2021–22	5	5	18/19	—
2022–23	12	2	20/20	7
2023–24	18	16	9/21	—
2024–25	19	19	1/20	—

== All-time series records ==
=== All-time series records against SEC members ===
Texas vs. current SEC members^{*}
Texas vs.	Overall Record	Last 5 meetings	Last 10 meetings	Current streak	SEC	Big 12
Alabama	9–5	4–1	6–4	W 3	0–0	–
Arkansas	68–89	3–2	5–5	L 1	0–1	–
Auburn	1–2	1–2	1–2	L 1	0–1	–
Florida	4–4	2–3	4–4	L 1	0–1	–
Georgia	5–9	1–4	3–7	L 2	0–0	–
Kentucky	1–2	1–2	1–2	W 1	1–0	–
LSU	13–20	3–2	5–5	W 2	1–0	–
Mississippi State	6–3	4–1	5–3	W 4	0–0	–
Missouri	13–13	2–3	4–6	W 1	1–0	11–9
Oklahoma	49–58	5–0	9–1	W 8	1–0	35–28
Ole Miss	9–7	2–3	4–6	L 1	0–1	–
South Carolina	1–2	1–2	1–2	L 1	0–1	–
Tennessee	4–7	2–3	4–6	L 3	0–1	–
Texas A&M	140–87	3–2	7–3	W 1	1–1	27–7
Vanderbilt	5–5	2–3	4–4	W 2	0–0	–
*As of January 25, 2025.

=== All-time series records against former Big 12 members ===
Texas vs. former Big 12 members^{*}
Texas vs.	Overall record	Last 5 meetings	Last 10 meetings	Current streak	During membership in Big 12	Last meeting
Baylor	165–98	2–3	2–8	L 1	35–26	2024
Colorado	15–10	3–2	7–3	W 1	13–6	2019
Houston	32–34	2–3	5–5	L 3	0–2	2024
Iowa State	28–21	2–3	6–4	L 1	27–17	2024
Kansas	14–38	2–3	5–5	L 1	13–34	2024
Kansas State	23–25	2–3	7–3	L 1	23–20	2024
Nebraska	16–6	3–2	8–2	L 1	12–4	2011
Oklahoma State	59–47	5–0	7–3	W 5	40–23	2024
TCU	118–70	3–2	8–2	W 2	20–8	2024
Texas Tech	90–67	2–3	4–6	W 1	45–18	2024
West Virginia	18–11	4–1	7–3	W 1	16–10	2024
*As of December 4, 2024.

=== All-time series records against non-Big 12 former SWC members ===
In series against former Southwest Conference members who are not current members of the Big 12, Texas does not trail any opponent.

In contests against these opponents since the dissolution of the Southwest Conference, Texas holds the lead against all opponents but SMU, whom the Longhorns have not played since joining the Big 12. The Longhorns hold the advantage against every opponent in the last five games played and in the last ten games played against each respective opponent.

Texas vs. former SWC opponents (non-Big 12)^{*}
Texas vs.	Overall record	at Austin	at opponent's venue	at neutral site	Last 5 meetings	Last 10 meetings	Current streak	Since end of SWC	Last meeting
Rice	UT, 138–59	UT, 76–21	UT, 57–34	UT, 5–4	UT, 5–0	UT, 10–0	W 10	UT, 9–0	2014-12-29
SMU	UT, 103–71	UT, 57–25	UT, 41–40	SMU, 6–5	UT, 5–0	UT, 8–2	W 7	—	1996-03-08
*As of November 9, 2018.

=== Records against all other collegiate opponents ===
Texas vs.*	Games played	Overall record	Last 5 meetings	Last 10 meetings	Current streak	Last meeting
Alabama–Birmingham	1	UT, 1–0	UT, 1–0	UT, 1–0	W 1	2016-12-21
Alaska–Anchorage	3	UT, 2–1	UT, 2–1	UT, 2–1	L 1	1986-11-29
Alcorn State	2	UT, 2–0	UT, 2–0	UT, 2–0	W 2	2014-11-16
American Eagles	1	UT, 1–0	UT, 1–0	UT, 1–0	W 1	1997-12-03
Appalachian State	2	UT, 2–0	UT, 2–0	UT, 2–0	W 2	2015-12-15
Arizona	11	UA, 9–2	UA, 5–0	UA, 9–1	L 9	2011-03-20
Arizona State	5	UT, 4–1	UT, 4–1	UT, 4–1	W 2	2014-03-20
Arkansas–Monticello	1	UT, 1–0	UT, 1–0	UT, 1–0	W 1	2007-11-18
Arkansas State	1	UT, 1–0	UT, 1–0	UT, 1–0	W 1	1978-11-29
Army	3	UT, 3–0	UT, 3–0	UT, 3–0	W 3	1984-12-28
Austin Peay	1	UT, 1–0	UT, 1–0	UT, 1–0	W 1	2008-03-21
Baptist College	1	UT, 1–0	UT, 1–0	UT, 1–0	W 1	1985-11-25
Biscayne	5	UT, 5–0	UT, 5–0	UT, 5–0	W 5	1983-12-06
Boston College	1	UT, 1–0	UT, 1–0	UT, 1–0	W 1	2002-03-15
Boston University	1	UT, 1–0	UT, 1–0	UT, 1–0	W 1	2011-11-13
Bowling Green	1	UT, 1–0	UT, 1–0	UT, 1–0	W 1	1986-12-19
Brigham Young	6	BYU, 4–2	BYU, 3–2	BYU, 4–2	L 1	2013-11-25
Brown	2	tied, 1–1	tied, 1–1	tied, 1–1	W 1	2003-11-17
Butler	2	tied, 1–1	tied, 1–1	tied, 1–1	W 1	2017-11-23
California	4	tied, 2–2	tied, 2–2	tied, 2–2	W 2	2014-11-21
UC Davis	1	UT, 1–0	UT, 1–0	UT, 1–0	W 1	2007-11-16
UC Irvine	1	UT, 1–0	UT, 1–0	UT, 1–0	W 1	2009-11-15
Cal State Pomona	1	UT, 1–0	UT, 1–0	UT, 1–0	W 1	1975-12-08
UC Riverside	2	UT, 2–0	UT, 2–0	UT, 2–0	W 2	1984-12-20
UC Santa Barbara	4	UT, 3–1	UT, 3–1	UT, 3–1	W 2	1991-12-22
Canisius	2	tied, 1–1	tied, 1–1	tied, 1–1	L 1	1950-12-14
Centenary	15	UT, 9–6	UT, 5–0	UT, 6–4	W 5	2006-12-28
Central Missouri	2	tied, 1–1	tied, 1–1	tied, 1–1	W 1	1986-12-03
Chaminade	2	tied, 1–1	tied, 1–1	tied, 1–1	L 1	2012-11-19
Charlotte	1	UT, 1–0	UT, 1–0	UT, 1–0	W 1	1982-12-30
Chattanooga	3	UT, 2–1	UT, 2–1	UT, 2–1	W 1	1988-12-10
Chicago State	1	UT, 1–0	UT, 1–0	UT, 1–0	W 1	2006-11-10
Cincinnati	2	UC, 2–0	UC, 2–0	UC, 2–0	L 2	2012-03-16
The Citadel	1	UT, 1–0	UT, 1–0	UT, 1–0	W 1	2018-11-16
CCNY	2	UT, 2–0	UT, 2–0	UT, 2–0	W 2	1947-12-18
Clemson	2	tied, 1–1	tied, 1–1	tied, 1–1	W 1	1991-12-28
Colorado State	2	UT, 2–0	UT, 2–0	UT, 2–0	W 2	1952-12-15
Connecticut	9	UConn, 6–3	UT, 3–2	UConn, 6–3	L 1	2015-12-29
Coppin State	4	UT, 4–0	UT, 4–0	UT, 4–0	W 4	2012-11-12
Cornell	1	UT, 1–0	UT, 1–0	UT, 1–0	W 1	1975-12-30
Creighton	1	CU, 1–0	CU, 1–0	CU, 1–0	L 1	1974-03-09
Dallas Baptist	8	UT, 5–3	UT, 5–0	UT, 5–3	W 5	1918-01-19
Dallas	2	UT, 2–0	UT, 2–0	UT, 2–0	W 2	1915-01-22
Daniel Baker	6	UT, 6–0	UT, 5–0	UT, 6–0	W 6	1931-12-11
Dartmouth	1	UT, 1–0	UT, 1–0	UT, 1–0	W 1	1970-12-30
Davidson	1	DU, 1–0	DU, 1–0	DU, 1–0	L 1	1968-12-28
Denver	1	UT, 1–0	UT, 1–0	UT, 1–0	W 1	1962-12-28
DePaul	11	UT, 7–4	UT, 5–0	UT, 6–4	W 6	2013-11-26
Drake	4	tied, 2–2	tied, 2–2	tied, 2–2	W 2	1981-12-22
Duke	5	DU, 5–0	DU, 5–0	DU, 5–0	L 5	2017-11-24
Duquesne	1	DU, 1–0	DU, 1–0	DU, 1–0	L 1	1953-12-17
East Central (OK)	2	UT, 2–0	UT, 2–0	UT, 2–0	W 2	1942-12-28
East Texas	5	UT, 5–0	UT, 5–0	UT, 5–0	W 5	1962-12-05
Eastern Illinois	1	UT, 1–0	UT, 1–0	UT, 1–0	W 1	2018-11-06
Eastern Washington	1	UT, 1–0	UT, 1–0	UT, 1–0	W 1	2016-11-17
Emporia State	1	UT, 1–0	UT, 1–0	UT, 1–0	W 1	1938-12-28
Fairleigh Dickinson	1	UT, 1–0	UT, 1–0	UT, 1–0	W 1	1975-12-20
Florida A&M	1	UT, 1–0	UT, 1–0	UT, 1–0	W 1	2017-11-29
Florida State	2	FSU, 2–0	FSU, 2–0	FSU, 2–0	L 2	1970-12-01
Fordham	1	FU, 1–0	FU, 1–0	FU, 1–0	L 1	1987-02-21
Fresno State	3	UT, 2–1	UT, 2–1	UT, 2–1	W 1	2012-11-09
Furman	1	FU, 1–0	FU, 1–0	FU, 1–0	L 1	1972-12-28
Gardner–Webb	1	UT, 1–0	UT, 1–0	UT, 1–0	W 1	2009-12-29
George Washington	2	UT, 2–0	UT, 2–0	UT, 2–0	W 2	2003-12-29
Georgetown	2	tied, 1–1	tied, 1–1	tied, 1–1	L 1	2012-12-04
Georgia Southwestern	1	UT, 1–0	UT, 1–0	UT, 1–0	W 1	1983-12-13
Georgia Tech	4	tied, 2–2	tied, 2–2	tied, 2–2	L 1	1991-11-27
Gonzaga	3	GU, 3–0	GU, 3–0	GU, 3–0	L 3	2017-11-26
Grand Canyon	1	UT, 1–0	UT, 1–0	UT, 1–0	W 1	2018-12-15
Hardin–Simmons	14	UT, 14–0	UT, 5–0	UT, 10–0	W 14	1981-11-28
Harvard	4	UT, 4–0	UT, 4–0	UT, 4–0	W 4	1982-12-18
Hawaii	2	tied, 1–1	tied, 1–1	tied, 1–1	W 1	1998-12-30
Houston Baptist	1	UT, 1–0	UT, 1–0	UT, 1–0	W 1	2013-11-18
Howard Payne	7	UT, 7–0	UT, 5–0	UT, 7–0	W 7	1966-12-13
Illinois	5	UT, 3–2	UT, 3–2	UT, 3–2	W 2	2010-11-18
Incarnate Word	1	UT, 1–0	UT, 1–0	UT, 1–0	W 1	2016-11-11
Indiana	2	tied, 1–1	tied, 1–1	tied, 1–1	L 1	2001-11-24
Indiana State	1	UT, 1–0	UT, 1–0	UT, 1–0	W 1	2000-03-16
Iowa	5	UT, 3–2	UT, 3–2	UT, 3–2	W 3	2014-11-20
Jacksonville	1	UT, 1–0	UT, 1–0	UT, 1–0	W 1	2001-12-15
Kent State	1	KSU, 1–0	KSU, 1–0	KSU, 1–0	L 1	2016-12-27
Lamar	5	UT, 5–0	UT, 5–0	UT, 5–0	W 5	2010-12-01
Lehigh	1	UT, 1–0	UT, 1–0	UT, 1–0	W 1	1988-12-09
Liberty	1	UT, 1–0	UT, 1–0	UT, 1–0	W 1	1997-11-26
Lipscomb	2	UT, 2–0	UT, 2–0	UT, 2–0	W 2	2017-11-18
Long Beach State	9	UT, 6–3	UT, 4–1	UT, 6–3	W 3	2016-12-10
Long Island	1	UT, 1–0	UT, 1–0	UT, 1–0	W 1	1946-12-17
Louisiana–Lafayette	4	tied, 2–2	tied, 2–2	tied, 2–2	W 2	1999-11-20
Louisiana–Monroe	3	UT, 3–0	UT, 3–0	UT, 3–0	W 3	2018-11-12
Louisiana Tech	4	UT, 4–0	UT, 4–0	UT, 4–0	W 4	2017-12-16
Louisville	5	UL, 4–1	UL, 4–1	UL, 4–1	L 3	1997-03-21
Loyola (Maryland)	1	UT, 1–0	UT, 1–0	UT, 1–0	W 1	1990-12-07
Manhattan	4	UT, 3–1	UT, 3–1	UT, 3–1	W 2	1989-12-08
Marquette	1	MU, 1–0	MU, 1–0	MU, 1–0	L 1	1977-12-27
Maryland	1	UM, 1–0	UM, 1–0	UM, 1–0	L 1	1995-03-18
Maryville	1	UT, 1–0	UT, 1–0	UT, 1–0	W 1	1942-12-31
Massachusetts	3	UT, 2–1	UT, 2–1	UT, 2–1	W 2	2000-02-05
McMurry	3	UT, 3–0	UT, 3–0	UT, 3–0	W 3	1959-12-01
McNeese State	2	UT, 2–0	UT, 2–0	UT, 2–0	W 2	2002-12-19
Memphis	6	UT, 4–2	UT, 3–2	UT, 4–2	L 1	2008-03-30
Mercer	2	UT, 2–0	UT, 2–0	UT, 2–0	W 2	2013-11-08
Miami	3	UT, 2–1	UT, 2–1	UT, 2–1	W 2	2008-03-23
Michigan	7	UM, 5–2	UM, 4–1	UM, 5–2	L 4	2017-12-12
Michigan State	10	MSU, 6–4	MSU, 3–2	MSU, 6–4	L 3	2018-11-23
Minnesota	1	UT, 1–0	UT, 1–0	UT, 1–0	W 1	2009-03-19
Missouri Southern	1	UT, 1–0	UT, 1–0	UT, 1–0	W 1	1983-11-26
Missouri Western	2	UT, 2–0	UT, 2–0	UT, 2–0	W 2	1984-12-17
Montana State	1	MSU, 1–0	MSU, 1–0	MSU, 1–0	L 1	1966-12-28
Montana State–Northern	1	UT, 1–0	UT, 1–0	UT, 1–0	W 1	1978-11-27
Mount St. Mary's (MD)	1	UT, 1–0	UT, 1–0	UT, 1–0	W 1	2003-01-05
Murray State	5	UT, 3–2	UT, 3–2	UT, 3–2	W 3	1993-01-19
Navy	2	UT, 2–0	UT, 2–0	UT, 2–0	W 2	2010-11-08
Nevada	2	UN, 2–0	UN, 2–0	UN, 2–0	L 2	2018-03-16
New Hampshire	1	UT, 1–0	UT, 1–0	UT, 1–0	W 1	2017-11-14
New Mexico	2	UNM, 2–0	UNM, 2–0	UNM, 2–0	L 2	2007-11-23
New Mexico State	4	UT, 3–1	UT, 3–1	UT, 3–1	W 3	2007-11-23
New Orleans	3	UNO, 2–1	UNO, 2–1	UNO, 2–1	W 1	2003-12-14
NYU	3	NYU, 2–1	NYU, 2–1	NYU, 2–1	L 1	1967-12-07
Niagara	1	UT, 1–0	UT, 1–0	UT, 1–0	W 1	1999-12-28
Nicholls State	2	UT, 2–0	UT, 2–0	UT, 2–0	W 2	2011-12-13
North Carolina	11	UT, 8–3	UT, 4–1	UT, 8–2	W 4	2018-11-22
North Carolina–Asheville	2	UT, 2–0	UT, 2–0	UT, 2–0	W 2	2003-03-21
North Carolina State	4	tied, 2–2	tied, 2–2	tied, 2–2	L 1	2011-11-21
North Carolina Wesleyan	1	UT, 1–0	UT, 1–0	UT, 1–0	W 1	1982-11-27
North Dakota State	1	UT, 1–0	UT, 1–0	UT, 1–0	W 1	2014-11-14
North Florida	1	UT, 1–0	UT, 1–0	UT, 1–0	W 1	2010-12-14
North Texas	34	UT, 29–5	UT, 5–0	UT, 8–2	W 7	2011-11-29
Northern Iowa	1	UNI, 1–0	UNI, 1–0	UNI, 1–0	L 1	2016-03-18
Northwestern	3	NU, 2–1	NU, 2–1	NU, 2–1	L 1	2016-11-21
Northwestern State (LA)	5	UT, 5–0	UT, 5–0	UT, 5–0	W 5	2017-11-10
Notre Dame	3	ND, 2–1	ND, 2–1	ND, 2–1	L 2	2008-11-25
Oakland	1	UT, 1–0	UT, 1–0	UT, 1–0	W 1	2011-03-18
Ohio	1	UT, 1–0	UT, 1–0	UT, 1–0	W 1	1969-12-29
Ohio State	1	OSU, 1–0	OSU, 1–0	OSU, 1–0	L 1	1986-03-17
Oklahoma City	8	tied, 4–4	UT, 3–2	tied, 4–4	W 1	1977-12-20
Oral Roberts	11	UT, 9–2	UT, 5–0	UT, 9–1	W 9	2007-12-18
Oregon	7	UO, 5–2	UO, 3–2	UO, 5–2	W 1	2008-11-26
Oregon State	6	UT, 4–2	UT, 3–2	UT, 4–2	L 1	2011-11-29
Pacific	2	tied, 1–1	tied, 1–1	tied, 1–1	L 1	1980-11-29
Pennsylvania	2	UT, 2–0	UT, 2–0	UT, 2–0	W 2	2006-03-17
Pepperdine	2	UT, 2–0	UT, 2–0	UT, 2–0	W 2	1988-11-25
Phillips	2	UT, 2–0	UT, 2–0	UT, 2–0	W 2	1922-01-24
Pittsburgh	3	Pitt, 2–1	Pitt, 2–1	Pitt, 2–1	L 1	2010-11-19
Pittsburg State (KS)	2	PSU, 2–0	PSU, 2–0	PSU, 2–0	L 2	1941-12-30
Prairie View A&M	1	UT, 1–0	UT, 1–0	UT, 1–0	W 1	2005-12-30
Princeton	8	tied, 4–4	UT, 3–2	tied, 4–4	W 2	2004-03-18
Providence	5	tied, 3–3	UT, 3–2	tied, 3–3	L 1	2018-12-21
Purdue	4	UT, 3–1	UT, 3–1	UT, 3–1	W 2	2018-12-09
Radford	1	RU, 1–0	RU, 1–0	RU, 1–0	L 1	2018-11-30
Rhode Island	6	UT, 5–1	UT, 4–1	UT, 5–1	W 3	2011-11-15
Rutgers	1	UT, 1–0	UT, 1–0	UT, 1–0	W 1	1978-03-19
St. Edward's	18	UT, 15–3	UT, 5–0	UT, 8–2	W 7	1939-01-31
St. Francis (PA)	1	UT, 1–0	UT, 1–0	UT, 1–0	W 1	2014-11-25
St. John's	2	tied, 1–1	tied, 1–1	tied, 1–1	W 1	2006-11-17
St. Joseph's	4	UT, 4–0	UT, 4–0	UT, 4–0	W 4	2008-11-24
St. Mary's (CA)	1	UT, 1–0	UT, 1–0	UT, 1–0	W 1	2008-01-05
St. Mary's (TX)	1	UT, 1–0	UT, 1–0	UT, 1–0	W 1	1928-12-14
St. Peter's	1	UT, 1–0	UT, 1–0	UT, 1–0	W 1	1991-03-15
Samford	2	UT, 2–0	UT, 2–0	UT, 2–0	W 2	2015-12-04
Sam Houston State	16	UT, 14–2	UT, 5–0	UT, 9–1	W 6	2012-11-27
San Diego	2	tied, 1–1	tied, 1–1	tied, 1–1	W 1	1999-12-11
San Diego State	3	SDSU, 2–1	SDSU, 2–1	SDSU, 2–1	W 1	1991-12-07
San Francisco	2	tied, 1–1	tied, 1–1	tied, 1–1	W 1	1979-12-27
Santa Clara	1	SCU, 1–0	SCU, 1–0	SCU, 1–0	L 1	1982-12-29
Seattle	1	SU, 1–0	SU, 1–0	SU, 1–0	L 1	1965-12-29
Seton Hall	3	UT, 2–1	UT, 2–1	UT, 2–1	W 2	2004-12-04
South Alabama	5	UT, 4–1	UT, 4–1	UT, 4–1	W 2	2013-11-12
South Florida	3	USF, 2–1	USF, 2–1	USF, 2–1	L 2	2000-12-09
Southeastern Oklahoma State	5	UT, 5–0	UT, 5–0	UT, 5–0	W 5	1945-12-15
Southern	1	UT, 1–0	UT, 1–0	UT, 1–0	W 1	2005-11-15
Southern California	12	USC, 7–5	USC, 4–1	USC, 6–4	L 2	2012-11-20
Southern Illinois	3	UT, 2–1	UT, 2–1	UT, 2–1	W 2	1970-12-10
Southern Mississippi	2	UT, 2–0	UT, 2–0	UT, 2–0	W 2	1968-12-19
Southern Utah	1	UT, 1–0	UT, 1–0	UT, 1–0	W 1	1988-12-19
Southwestern (KS)	1	UT, 1–0	UT, 1–0	UT, 1–0	W 1	1984-11-24
Southwestern (TX)	37	UT, 36–1	UT, 5–0	UT, 9–1	W 6	1947-01-30
Southwestern Oklahoma State	16	UT, 11–5	UT, 4–1	UT, 7–3	L 1	1937-01-01
Springfield (MO)	1	UT, 1–0	UT, 1–0	UT, 1–0	W 1	1940-12-26
Stanford	5	UT, 3–2	UT, 3–2	UT, 3–2	W 1	2015-12-19
Stephen F. Austin	6	UT, 6–0	UT, 5–0	UT, 6–0	W 6	2013-11-15
Stetson	4	UT, 4–0	UT, 4–0	UT, 4–0	W 4	2008-11-14
Sul Ross State	2	SRSU, 2–0	SRSU, 2–0	SRSU, 2–0	L 2	1926-01-02
Syracuse	1	SU, 1–0	SU, 1–0	SU, 1–0	L 1	2003-04-05
Temple	6	UT, 4–2	UT, 4–1	UT, 4–2	W 2	2013-12-07
Tennessee State	2	UT, 2–0	UT, 2–0	UT, 2–0	W 2	2017-12-18
Tennessee Tech	1	UT, 1–0	UT, 1–0	UT, 1–0	W 1	1993-12-22
Texas A&I	10	UT, 9–1	UT, 5–0	UT, 9–1	W 5	1957-12-03
Texas A&M–Corpus Christi	4	UT, 4–0	UT, 4–0	UT, 4–0	W 4	2015-11-21
UT–Arlington	11	UT, 10–1	UT, 4–1	UT, 9–1	L 1	2016-11-29
UT–El Paso (Texas Western)	4	UTEP, 3–1	UTEP, 3–1	UTEP, 3–1	L 2	1991-12-29
UT–Pan American	6	UT, 6–0	UT, 5–0	UT, 6–0	W 6	2009-12-15
UT–San Antonio	7	UT, 7–0	UT, 5–0	UT, 7–0	W 7	2015-12-08
Texas Southern	3	UT, 3–0	UT, 3–0	UT, 3–0	W 3	2008-12-16
Texas State	49	UT, 44–5	UT, 5–0	UT, 10–0	W 26	2014-12-13
Texas Wesleyan	7	UT, 6–1	UT, 5–0	UT, 6–1	W 6	1966-12-02
Trinity	10	UT, 9–1	UT, 5–0	UT, 9–1	W 6	1965-01-27
Tulane	16	UT, 10–6	UT, 4–1	UT, 8–2	W 4	2008-11-18
Tulsa	2	UT, 2–0	UT, 2–0	UT, 2–0	W 2	1960-12-17
UCLA	6	tied, 3–3	UT, 3–2	tied, 3–3	W 2	2012-12-08
UNLV	2	UT, 2–0	UT, 2–0	UT, 2–0	W 2	2005-01-02
Utah	9	UU, 5–4	UU, 3–2	UU, 5–4	L 1	2001-12-29
Utah State	2	USU, 2–0	USU, 2–0	USU, 2–0	L 2	1987-12-12
Vermont	1	UT, 1–0	UT, 1–0	UT, 1–0	W 1	1979-12-07
Villanova	3	UT, 2–1	UT, 2–1	UT, 2–1	W 1	2008-12-09
Virginia Commonwealth	4	tied, 2–2	tied, 2–2	tied, 2–2	L 1	2018-12-05
VMI	2	UT, 2–0	UT, 2–0	UT, 2–0	W 2	1989-12-21
Wake Forest	5	WFU, 4–1	WFU, 4–1	WFU, 4–1	L 2	2010-03-18
Washington	4	UT, 3–1	UT, 3–1	UT, 3–1	W 1	2015-11-26
Washington State	2	UT, 2–0	UT, 2–0	UT, 2–0	W 2	2001-12-10
Weber State	2	tied, 1–1	tied, 1–1	tied, 1–1	W 1	1992-12-29
West Texas A&M	6	UT, 4–2	UT, 4–1	UT, 4–2	W 2	1940-12-28
Western Carolina	1	UT, 1–0	UT, 1–0	UT, 1–0	W 1	2009-11-18
Western Kentucky	2	UT, 2–0	UT, 2–0	UT, 2–0	W 2	1994-03-17
Westminster (MO)	1	UT, 1–0	UT, 1–0	UT, 1–0	W 1	1938-12-27
Wichita State	3	WSU, 2–1	WSU, 2–1	WSU, 2–1	W 1	1968-12-27
William & Mary	2	UT, 2–0	UT, 2–0	UT, 2–0	W 2	1987-12-05
Wisconsin	6	UW, 4–2	UW, 3–2	UW, 4–2	W 1	2008-12-23
Wisconsin–Stout	1	UT, 1–0	UT, 1–0	UT, 1–0	W 1	1976-12-03
Wofford	2	UT, 2–0	UT, 2–0	UT, 2–0	W 2	2003-12-04
Wyoming	3	UW, 2–1	UW, 2–1	UW, 2–1	L 1	1949-12-27
Xavier	7	UT, 4–3	UT, 4–3	UT, 3–2	L 1	2025-03-19

== Rivalries ==
=== Big 12 rivals ===
==== Oklahoma Sooners ====
With the formation of the Big 12 Conference in 1996, the Oklahoma Sooners became the Longhorns' main rival in basketball. Texas and Oklahoma are not traditional rivals in any sport other than football, due to their prior residence in different conferences (UT in the Southwest Conference and OU in the Big Eight Conference); nonetheless, the two basketball programs had already compiled a significant series history prior to formation of the Big 12, having met 14 times from 1947 to 1957, 11 times from 1986 until the beginning of Big 12 competition in 1997, and at various other times in the programs' histories. The Sooners entered the Big with a 29–13 lead in the all-time series, having won 10 of the 11 games played from 1986 to 1996. In the Big 12, the competitiveness of the Texas and OU basketball programs—which are second and third in all-time Big 12 regular season conference wins, respectively—only accelerated the development of the basketball rivalry.

The Texas Longhorns and the Oklahoma Sooners play one game in Austin and one game in Norman each year during the regular season. Oklahoma leads the overall series 54–39; Texas leads 26–25 in games played since the inception of the Big 12. Texas has held the upper hand in recent years, winning 23 of 35 meetings from 2003 to 2018.

==== Kansas Jayhawks ====
Rick Barnes' tenure also coincided with the emergence of a rivalry between Texas and the Big 12 Conference's traditional national basketball powerhouse, the Kansas Jayhawks. Under Rick Barnes, the Longhorns emerged as Kansas's most consistent competition for Big 12 Conference supremacy. From the inception of the Big 12 through February 18, 2018, Texas has produced a 223–139 (.616) mark against conference competition during the regular season, trailing only Kansas's record of 299–63 (.826).

The first decade of the 2000s saw the peak of this new rivalry, with the Longhorns at one point trailing Kansas only 5–7 in games played over an almost-nine-season period, and with many of the contests being closely contested classics. Since the beginning of the 2008–09 season, Texas has been less competitive both nationally and in the rivalry, trailing Kansas 2–15 in games played since that time.

Texas and Kansas played one game during the regular season until the 2011–12 season, when the two schools began meeting twice per year. Kansas leads the overall series 30–8 and has won 26 of the 33 contests since the Big 12 was formed. Current KU head coach Bill Self is 20–6 in games against Texas since becoming the Jayhawks' head coach prior to the 2003–04 season.

==== Baylor Bears ====
The Longhorns' series with the Baylor Bears has featured more games played than any other UT basketball series; it is also the conference series most lopsided in UT's favor, with the exception of the Longhorns' series against former Southwest Conference opponent Rice and the much more abbreviated series against former Big 12 member Nebraska. Texas leads 162–90 in the overall series with Baylor.

The intensity of the in-state rivalry has grown sharply in recent years with Baylor's emergence as a nationally competitive program under current head coach Scott Drew. Through the end of the 2008–09 regular season, Texas held a 25–3 record against Baylor in Big 12 competition and a 24–0 record against the Bears under Rick Barnes. In games played since the 2009 Big 12 conference tournament semifinals, Baylor holds a 15–7 edge over Texas.

==== Texas Tech Red Raiders ====
Texas and Texas Tech have played at least twice yearly since the 1957–58 season. The Longhorns and the Red Raiders play one game in Austin and one game in Lubbock each year during the regular season.

At the time that UT and Texas Tech entered the Big 12, Texas Tech held a 49–45 lead in the all-time series against Texas. Longtime Red Raider coach Gerald Myers' teams dominated the Longhorns for much of the 1970s and 1980s, with the only interlude of Longhorn success occurring during the six-year tenure of Abe Lemons (1976–82), who finished 8–4 against the Red Raiders. By the time Tom Penders became the Texas head coach prior to the 1988–89 season, Texas Tech held a 43–32 lead in the series. Penders narrowed Texas Tech's lead to 50–49 during his tenure (1988–98). During Rick Barnes' 17 seasons as head coach (1998–2015), the Longhorns posted a 33–4 record against the Red Raiders, for a period of dominance unequaled at any other point in the series.

Texas currently leads the overall series 86–57 and has won 41 of the 49 contests since the formation of the Big 12.

==== Oklahoma State Cowboys ====
The formation of the Big 12 led to the development of a competitive rivalry between Texas and the Oklahoma State Cowboys, two programs that had already compiled a significant series history despite their residence in different conferences since OSU's departure from the Southwest Conference following the 1924–25 season. Between 1941 and 1979, Texas and OSU met 32 times, with the Cowboys winning 21 of the meetings. At the time of the formation of the Big 12, OSU held a 24–19 lead in the all-time series.

The rivalry reached its peak in the early years of the Big 12, above all when the tenures of Rick Barnes and Eddie Sutton coincided at the two schools, a time when both programs were nationally prominent. From the 1999–2000 season through the 2004–05 season, at least one of the two teams was ranked in 13 of 14 total contests, and both teams were ranked at the time of eight of the 14 meetings. In recent years, the rivalry has declined in intensity as both programs have receded from the national spotlight.

Texas and Oklahoma State have played at least twice yearly since 1997, the first Big 12 basketball season. The Longhorns and the Cowboys play one game in Austin and one game in Stillwater each year during the regular season. Texas currently leads the overall series 49–43 and holds a 30–19 lead in games played in Big 12 competition.

=== Other rivals ===
==== Arkansas Razorbacks ====
Texas and Arkansas shared a bitter rivalry in basketball—stoked by the mutual enmity that characterized their primary rivalry in football—throughout most of the existence of the Southwest Conference. Until Arkansas' departure for the Southeastern Conference after the 1990–91 season, the Longhorns and the Razorbacks had played at least twice—and often three times—each year since the 1924 season. Texas and Arkansas each won or shared 22 SWC championships (nine more than the nearest competitor, SMU)—although Texas claimed seven of these in the years before Arkansas established its basketball program in 1924 and in the years after Arkansas left the conference.

The Texas–Arkansas basketball rivalry was particularly competitive in its first quarter-century, and both programs enjoyed substantial overall success during this time, with each appearing in two Final Fours and one Elite Eight with the beginning of the NCAA Tournament in 1939 through the end of the 1940s. Arkansas led the series 29–25 over this span.

Both Texas and Arkansas faded from national significance with the end of the 1940s. From the 1949–50 season through the 1975–76 season, Arkansas won only two SWC championships, made only a single NCAA Tournament appearance, and posted an overall record of 312–338 (.480). Texas fared modestly better during this time, winning seven SWC championships, making four NCAA Tournament appearances, and posting an overall record of 342–323 (.514). The Longhorns and Razorbacks split their conference series during this period, with each winning 29 games.

The rivalry grew especially heated from the mid-1970s onward as both schools' athletic departments poured additional resources into their basketball programs, both for coaching hires and for facilities, each seeking to revive programs that had receded from the national stage over the preceding quarter-century. While both Texas and Arkansas appeared to be on the verge of establishing nationally competitive programs with the hires of Abe Lemons and Eddie Sutton, respectively, only Arkansas managed to achieve sustained success in the following years, winning at least 20 games in 13 seasons from 1977 to 1991, with Sutton (1974–85) and Nolan Richardson (1985–2002) each reaching a Final Four and an Elite Eight. (Richardson would lead the Razorbacks to two more Final Fours and a national championship after Arkansas' departure from the SWC.) Arkansas dominated the series over this final phase of the SWC rivalry, winning 27 out of 37 games played during this period.

Arkansas led the series 85–64 upon leaving the SWC; the Razorbacks currently lead the all-time series 87–68, with Texas having won four of the six games played since Arkansas joined the SEC.

==== Texas A&M Aggies ====
Before the Texas A&M Aggies' departure for the Southeastern Conference at the end of the 2012 academic year, Texas and Texas A&M had played at least twice (and up to four times) yearly since 1917. During their concurrent membership in the Big 12, the Longhorns and the Aggies played two games during the regular season, with the venue alternating between the home courts of each school. Texas leads the overall series 137–86.

By the time the Big 12 was formed, the in-state rivalry was at a low ebb. The Longhorns had won 18 of the previous 21 contests against the Aggies, dating back to the 1987–88 season. Texas continued to dominate the series in Big 12 play, winning 15 of the first 16 contests between the schools in their new conference. By the time the Aggies hired Billy Gillispie prior to the 2004–05 season, the lopsided nature of the series—and the lack of Aggie fan interest in a program that had gone ten consecutive years without a winning season or postseason appearance under prior coaches—had long since diminished the stature of the once-heated rivalry.

With the rejuvenation of the Texas A&M basketball program under Billy Gillispie (2004–07) and Mark Turgeon (2007–11), the basketball rivalry between Texas and Texas A&M quickly intensified. The Aggies successfully defended their home court from Gillispie's first year through the 2009–10 season, Mark Turgeon's second-to-last season with A&M. The Longhorns defeated the Aggies in all three games in Turgeon's final season and in both games in Billy Kennedy's first season with the Aggies. Texas is 12–7 against Texas A&M since Gillispie was hired in 2004.

The rivalry will be renewed when Texas joins A&M in the SEC prior to the 2024–25 season.

== Individual honors, awards, and accomplishments ==
=== Honors, awards, and accomplishments by player ===
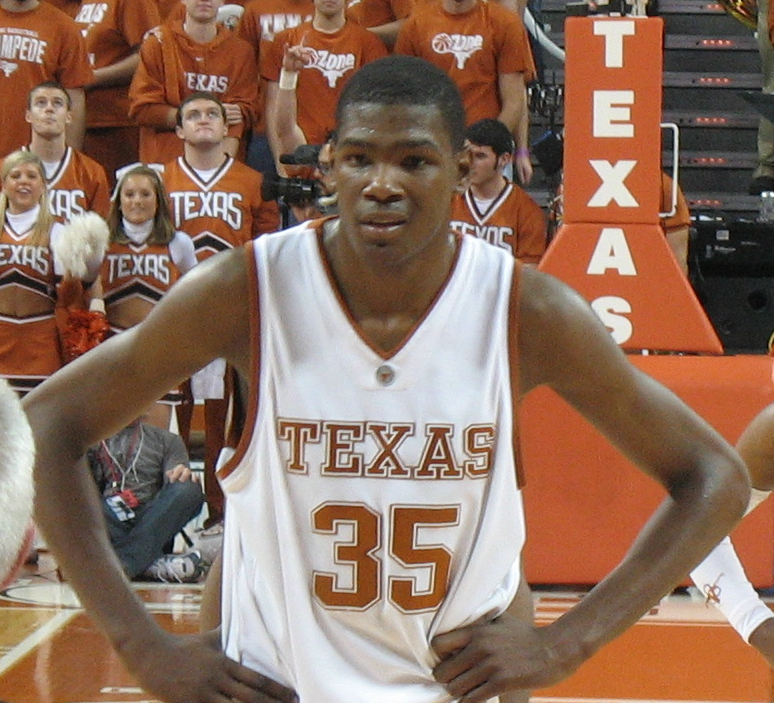
Kevin Durant, Texas Longhorn freshman forward and unanimous 2007 National Player of the Year

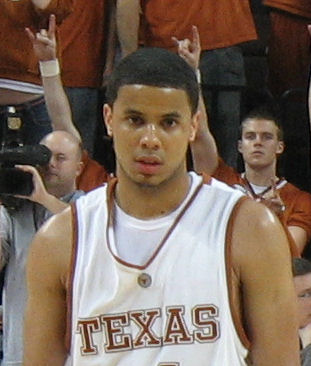
D. J. Augustin, 2008 Bob Cousy Award Winner

The individual honors, awards, and accomplishments listed in the succeeding subsections are aggregated by player in the following table. Players with only all-conference honors (other than conference player of the year), lower than first-team All-America honors, or later than second-round draft positions are not included.

Name	Position	Seasons	Notes
LaMarcus Aldridge	PF	2005–06	Seven-time NBA All-Star (2012–16, 2018–19); Two-time All-NBA second team (2015, 2018); Three-time All-NBA third team (2011, 2014, 2016); 2007 NBA All-Rookie first team 2006 NBA draft 1st Round, 2nd pick—Portland Trail Blazers; 2006 third-team All-American forward 2006 Big 12 Defensive Player of the Year; 2006 first-team All-Big 12 forward
Jarrett Allen	C	2017	NBA All-Star (2022); 2017 NBA draft 1st Round, 22nd pick—Brooklyn Nets
Jay Arnette	PG	1958–60	1960 Olympic gold medalist 1960 NBA draft 2nd Round, 1st pick (9th overall)—Cincinnati Royals; 1960 first-team All-American guard 1960 first-team All-SWC
D. J. Augustin	PG	2007–08	2009 NBA All-Rookie second team 2008 NBA draft 1st Round, 9th pick—Charlotte Bobcats; 2008 Bob Cousy Award winner 2008 Consensus first-team All-American guard 2008 Academic All-American; 2008 Unanimous first-team All-Big 12 guard
Mohamed Bamba	C	2018	2018 NBA draft 1st Round, 6th pick—Orlando Magic
Ron Baxter	F	1977–80	1980 NBA draft 4th Round, 22nd pick (91st overall)—Los Angeles Lakers; 1980 Southwest Conference Player of the Year; Three-time first-team All-SWC (1978–80); 1978 NIT Co-MVP
Lance Blanks	G	1989–90	1990 NBA draft 1st Round, 26th pick—Detroit Pistons
Avery Bradley	G	2010	2016 NBA All-Defensive first team 2013 NBA All-Defensive second team 2010 NBA draft 1st Round, 19th pick—Boston Celtics
John Brownlee	F	1985–86	1986 NBA draft 4th Round, 8th pick (78th overall)—Los Angeles Clippers; 1986 Southwest Conference Player of the Year; 1986 first-team All-SWC
Albert Burditt	PF	1991–94	1994 NBA draft 2nd Round, 26th pick (53rd overall)—Houston Rockets; 1994 first-team All-SWC
Kris Clack	PF	1996–99	1999 NBA draft 2nd Round, 26th pick (55th overall)—Boston Celtics; 1996 Southwest Conference Freshman of the Year
Abb Curtis	G	1922–24	1924 Consensus first-team All-American guard 1924 first-team All-SWC
Raymond Downs	F	1955–57	1957 NBA draft 6th Round, 4th pick (44th overall)—St. Louis Hawks; Two-time second-team All-American forward (1956–57); Two-time first-team All-SWC (1956–57)
Kevin Durant	F	2007	Two-time NBA Finals Most Valuable Player (2017–18); 2016 Olympic gold medalist 2014 NBA Most Valuable Player; 2012 Olympic gold medalist Fifteen-time NBA All-Star (2010–19, 2021–23); Six-time All-NBA first team (2010–14, 2018); Four-time All-NBA second team (2016–17, 2019, 2022); Four-time NBA Scoring Champion (2010–12, 2014); 2008 NBA Rookie of the Year; 2007 NBA draft 1st Round, 2nd pick—Seattle SuperSonics; No. 35 permanently retired at UT; Unanimous 2007 National Player of the Year (10 awards); 2007 Unanimous first-team All-American forward 2007 Big 12 Player of the Year; 2007 Big 12 Freshman of the Year
T. J. Ford	PG	2002–03	2004 NBA All-Rookie second team 2003 NBA draft 1st Round, 8th pick—Milwaukee Bucks, Toronto Raptors, San Antonio Spurs; No. 11 permanently retired at UT; 2003 National Player of the Year (Naismith Award, Wooden Award, and 4 other awards); 2003 Consensus first-team All-American guard 2002 Big 12 Freshman of the Year
Daniel Gibson	SG	2005–06	2006 NBA Draft 2nd Round, 12th pick (42nd overall)—Cleveland Cavaliers; 2005 Big 12 Freshman of the Year
Jack Gray	G	1933–35	1935 Consensus first-team All-American guard Three-time first-team All-SWC guard (1933–35); Longhorn basketball head coach (1937–42, 1946–51)
Jordan Hamilton	SG/SF	2010–11	2011 NBA draft 1st Round, 26th pick—Dallas Mavericks; 2011 Consensus second-team All-American guard/forward 2011 first-team All-Big 12 guard/forward
John Hargis	C	1942–43, 1947	1947 first-team All-American center 1943 second-team All-American center Two-time first-team All-SWC center (1943, 1947)
Jaxson Hayes	C	2019	2019 NBA draft 1st Round, 8th pick—New Orleans Pelicans
Royal Ivey	G	2001–04	2004 NBA draft 2nd Round, 8th pick (37th overall)—Atlanta Hawks, Milwaukee Bucks
Damion James	SF/PF	2007–10	2010 NBA draft 1st Round, 24th pick—Atlanta Hawks; 2010 second-team All-American forward 2010 first-team All-Big 12
Cory Joseph	G	2011	2011 NBA draft 1st Round, 29th pick—San Antonio Spurs
Jim Krivacs	G	1977–79	1978 NBA draft 6th Round, 4th pick (114th overall)—Kansas City Kings; 1979 second-team All-American guard 1978 first-team All-American guard 1978 NIT Co-MVP
Clyde Littlefield	C	1913–16	1916 Consensus first-team All-American center Two-time first-team All-SWC (1915–16); Acclaimed Longhorn head coach in football (1927–33) and track (1920–60)
Slater Martin	G	1946–49	Naismith Memorial Basketball Hall of Fame member (1982); Seven-time NBA All-Star (1953–59) during 11-year career (1950–60); Five-time All-NBA second team (1955–59); No. 15 permanently retired at UT; 1949 first-team All-American guard 1948 third-team All-American guard Two-time first-team All-SWC (1948–49)
Travis Mays	G	1987–90	1991 NBA All-Rookie second team 1990 NBA draft 1st Round, 14th pick—Sacramento Kings, Atlanta Hawks; Two-time Southwest Conference Player of the Year (1989–90); Three-time first-team All-SWC (1988–90); 1987 Southwest Conference Freshman of the Year
Chris Mihm	C	1998–2000	2001 NBA All-Rookie second team 2000 NBA draft 1st Round, 7th pick—Chicago Bulls, Cleveland Cavaliers, Los Angeles Lakers; 2000 Consensus first-team All-American center Two-time first-team All-Big 12 (1999–2000)
Bobby Moers	PG	1938–40	Two-time first-team All-American guard (1939–40); Two-time first-team All-SWC (1939–40)
Johnny Moore	PG	1976–79	1982 NBA assists leader 1979 NBA draft 2nd Round, 21st pick (43rd overall)—Seattle SuperSonics, New Jersey Nets, San Antonio Spurs; 1979 first-team All-SWC
Chris Owens	PF	2000–02	2002 NBA draft 2nd Round, 19th pick (48th overall)—Milwaukee Bucks
Dexter Pittman	C	2007–10	2009 NBA draft 2nd Round, 2nd pick (32nd overall)—Miami Heat
Terrence Rencher	G	1992–95	1995 NBA draft 2nd Round, 3rd pick (32nd overall)—Washington Bullets; Two-time first-team All-SWC (1992, 1995); 1992 Southwest Conference Freshman of the Year
LaSalle Thompson	C	1980–82	1982 NBA draft 1st Round, 5th pick—Kansas City Kings, Sacramento Kings, Indiana Pacers, Philadelphia 76ers, Denver Nuggets; 1982 first-team All-American center Two-time first-team All-SWC (1981–82)
Tristan Thompson	PF	2011	2012 NBA All-Rookie second team 2011 NBA draft 1st Round, 4th pick—Cleveland Cavaliers; 2011 Wayman Tisdale Award (USBWA National Freshman of the Year); 2011 Big 12 Freshman of the Year
P. J. Tucker	F	2004–06	2006 NBA draft 2nd Round, 5th pick (35th overall)—Toronto Raptors; 2008 Israeli Basketball Premier League MVP; 2006 second-team All-American forward 2006 Big 12 Player of the Year
Myles Turner	PF	2015	2016 NBA All-Rookie second team 2015 NBA draft 1st Round, 11th pick (11th overall)—Indiana Pacers; 2015 Big 12 Freshman of the Year
B. J. Tyler	PG	1992–94	1994 NBA draft 1st Round, 20th pick—Philadelphia 76ers 1994 third-team All-American guard 1994 Southwest Conference Player of the Year
Joey Wright	PG	1989–91	1991 NBA draft 2nd Round, 23rd pick (50th overall)—Phoenix Suns; 1991 first-team All-SWC
Kai Jones	F	2019–21	2021 NBA draft 1st Round, 19th pick—New York Knicks; 2021 Big 12 Sixth Man of the Year
Greg Brown	F	2020–21	2021 NBA draft 2nd Round, 13th pick (43rd overall)—New Orleans Pelicans; 2021 Big 12 All-Newcomer Team; 2021 Big 12 All-Freshman Team
Jericho Sims	F	2017–21	2021 NBA draft 2nd Round, 28th pick (58th overall)—New York Knicks

=== Naismith Basketball Hall of Fame ===
Slater Martin is the only Longhorn men's basketball player to have been inducted into the Naismith Memorial Basketball Hall of Fame in Springfield, Massachusetts. Martin was inducted on May 3, 1982.

Longhorns in the Naismith Basketball Hall of Fame
Player	No.	Position	Career	Date inducted
Slater Martin	15	G	1943–44, 1946–49	May 3, 1982

=== Retired numbers ===
Three Longhorn men's basketball players have had their Texas jersey numbers retired: Slater Martin, T. J. Ford, and Kevin Durant.

The primary requirement for the retirement of a UT student-athlete's number is that the individual have won a widely recognized National Player of the Year award. Former UT Athletic Director DeLoss Dodds stated that an exception was made in the case of Slater Martin because, as a Naismith Basketball Hall of Fame inductee, he was a legend in the sport of basketball but had competed before any of the widely recognized awards were established (the Sporting News Men's College Basketball Player of the Year was established in 1943, but it was not awarded from 1947 to 1949).

Texas Longhorns men's basketball retired numbers
No.	Player	Position	Career	No. ret.
11	T. J. Ford	G	2001–03	February 8, 2004
15	Slater Martin	G	1943–44, 1946–49	January 31, 2009
35	Kevin Durant	F	2006–07	February 25, 2009

=== National honors and awards (players) ===
==== National Player of the Year ====
T. J. Ford and Kevin Durant are the only Texas players to win one or more of the widely recognized National Player of the Year awards. Ford won the Naismith Trophy and the Wooden Award—as well as four of the other eight widely recognized awards—in 2003 as a sophomore. Durant was the unanimous national player of the year in 2007 as a true freshman, winning all 10 awards. Durant was the first freshman ever to win any of the National Player of the Year awards.

National Player of the Year award recipients
Player	No.	Position	Career	Award Year	Awards
T. J. Ford	11	G	2001–03	2003	Naismith College Player of the Year; John R. Wooden Award; Sporting News Men's College Basketball Player of the Year; CBS/Chevrolet National Player of the Year; SI.com National Player of the Year; ESPN.com Player of the Year
Kevin Durant	35	F	2006–07	2007	Naismith College Player of the Year; John R. Wooden Award; USBWA Oscar Robertson Trophy; Adolph Rupp Trophy; Associated Press College Basketball Player of the Year; NABC Player of the Year; Sporting News Men's College Basketball Player of the Year; CBS/Chevrolet National Player of the Year; SI.com National Player of the Year; ESPN.com Player of the Year

==== Bob Cousy Collegiate Point Guard of the Year Award ====
The Bob Cousy Award is awarded annually by the Naismith Memorial Basketball Hall of Fame to the top point guard in NCAA Division I men's basketball. The award was presented for the first time following the 2003–04 college basketball season (the season following T. J. Ford's departure to the NBA). D. J. Augustin is the only Longhorn to win the Bob Cousy Award.

Bob Cousy Award recipients
Player	No.	Position	Career	Award Year
D. J. Augustin	14	PG	2006–08	2008

==== Perry Wallace Most Courageous Award ====
The Perry Wallace Most Courageous Award is the men's version of the USBWA Most Courageous Award, presented annually by the United States Basketball Writers Association to one or more individuals (not necessarily players) who, in the organization's words, have "demonstrated extraordinary courage reflecting honor on the sport of amateur basketball." First presented in 1978 as a single award, separate men's and women's awards were first presented in 2010. The award's bifurcation by sex or gender does not reflect that of the recipient, but is instead based on whether the recipient was involved with the men's or women's game. This award was originally not restricted to college basketball, but every recipient since 1980 has been associated with the college game. The men's award was renamed in 2021 in memory of Wallace, the first African American to play basketball in the Southeastern Conference. Andrew Jones is the first Longhorn to receive this award; he shared 2022 honors with Justin Hardy, a player at NCAA Division III Washington (MO). Both averaged double figures in scoring for their respective teams in 2021–22 while battling cancer (leukemia for Jones, stomach cancer for Hardy).

Perry Wallace Most Courageous Award recipients
Player	No.	Position	Career	Award Year
Andrew Jones	1	SG	2017–22	2022

==== All-America honors ====
Twenty Texas basketball players have received All-America honors on 26 occasions; six have been recognized as All-Americans in two different seasons. Seven Longhorns have received consensus first-team All-America honors, and three others have received consensus second-team All-America honors. Thirteen Texas players have received first-team All-America honors in 14 seasons, with one Longhorn player having been selected as a first-team All-American twice.

Consensus first-team All-Americans
Consensus first-team All-Americans by year
Year	Player	No.	Position	Career
1916	Clyde Littlefield		C	1913–16
1924	Abb Curtis		G	1922–24
1935	Jack Gray	6	G	1933–35
2000	Chris Mihm	4	C	1998–2000
2003	T. J. Ford	11	PG	2002–03
2007	Kevin Durant	35	F	2006–07
2008	D. J. Augustin	14	PG	2007–08

Consensus second-team All-Americans
Consensus second-team All-Americans by year
Year	Player	No.	Position	Career
1947	John Hargis	27	F	1942–43, 1947
2006	P. J. Tucker	2	F	2004–06
2011	Jordan Hamilton	3	SG/SF	2010–11

First-team All-Americans (at least one selection)
First-team All-American selections by year
Year	Player	No.	Position	Career
1916	Clyde Littlefield		C	1913–16
1924	Abb Curtis		G	1922–24
1935	Jack Gray	6	G	1933–35
1939	Bobby Moers	12	G	1938–40
1940	Bobby Moers	23	G	1938–40
1947	John Hargis	27	F	1942–43, 1947
1949	Slater Martin	15	G	1943, 1947–49
1960	Jay Arnette	12	G	1958–60
1978	Jim Krivacs	11	G	1977–79
1982	LaSalle Thompson	42	C	1980–82
2000	Chris Mihm	4	C	1998–2000
2003	T. J. Ford	11	PG	2002–03
2007	Kevin Durant	35	F	2007
2008	D. J. Augustin	14	PG	2007–08

All-Americans (any selection)
All-American selections by year
Year	Player	No.	Position	Career
1916	Clyde Littlefield		C	1913–16
1924	Abb Curtis		G	1922–24
1934	Jack Gray	6	G	1933–35
1935	Jack Gray	6	G	1933–35
1939	Bobby Moers	12	G	1938–40
1940	Bobby Moers	23	G	1938–40
1943	John Hargis	27	F	1942–43, 1947
1947	John Hargis	27	F	1942–43, 1947
1948	Slater Martin	15	G	1943, 1947–49
1949	Slater Martin	15	G	1943, 1947–49
1950	Tom Hamilton	13	C	1947–50
1956	Raymond Downs	31	F	1955–57
1957	Raymond Downs	31	F	1955–57
1960	Jay Arnette	12	G	1958–60
1978	Jim Krivacs	11	G	1977–79
1979	Jim Krivacs	11	G	1977–79
1982	LaSalle Thompson	42	C	1980–82
1994	B. J. Tyler	10	PG	1992–94
2000	Chris Mihm	4	C	1998–2000
2003	T. J. Ford	11	PG	2002–03
2006	LaMarcus Aldridge	23	C	2005–06
2006	P. J. Tucker	2	F	2004–06
2007	Kevin Durant	35	F	2007
2008	D. J. Augustin	14	PG	2007–08
2010	Damion James	5	SF	2007–10
2011	Jordan Hamilton	3	SG/SF	2010–11

=== Conference honors and awards (players) ===
==== Conference Player of the Year ====
Texas players have won conference player of the year honors on ten occasions—eight times in the Southwest Conference and twice in the Big 12 Conference. Two Longhorn basketball players won SWC player of the year honors twice. Three Texas players have won Big 12 Defensive Player of the Year honors.

Southwest Conference Player of the Year
Southwest Conference Player of the Year
Year	Player	No.	Position	Career
1960	Jay Arnette	12	G	1957–60
1968	Billy Arnold	15	G	1966–68
1972	Larry Robinson	41	F	1972–74
1974	Larry Robinson	41	F	1972–74
1986	John Brownlee	55	C	1985–86
1989	Travis Mays	14	G	1987–90
1990	Travis Mays	14	G	1987–90
1994	B. J. Tyler	10	PG	1992–94

Big 12 Conference Player of the Year
Big 12 Conference Player of the Year
Year	Player	No.	Position	Career
2006	P. J. Tucker	2	F	2004–06
2007	Kevin Durant	35	F	2007

Big 12 Defensive Player of the Year
Big 12 Defensive Player of the Year
Year	Player	No.	Position	Career
2006	LaMarcus Aldridge	23	C	2005–06
2011	Doğuş Balbay	4	PG	2008–11
2016	Prince Ibeh	44	C	2013–16

Big 12 Sixth Man of the Year
Big 12 Sixth Man of the Year
Year	Player	No.	Position	Career
2021	Kai Jones	22	F	2019–21
2023	Sir'Jabari Rice	10	G	2022–23

==== First-team all-conference honors ====
Seventy-two Texas men's basketball players have received first-team all-conference honors on 96 occasions. Of these 72 players, 18 have received first-team all-conference honors in two seasons, and three players have received them in three seasons.

First-team All-Southwest Conference

First-team All-Southwest Conference
Year	Player	No.	Position	Career
1915	Pete Edmond		G	1913–16
1915	Clyde Littlefield		C	1913–16
1915	Grady Ross		G	1911–12, 1914–15
1916	Gus "Pig" Dittmar		G	1914, 1916–17
1916	Pete Edmond		G	1913–16
1916	Clyde Littlefield		C	1913–16
1917	Gus "Pig" Dittmar		G	1914, 1916–17
1917	James Thomas		G	
1917	Joe Thompson		F	
1918	Al DeViney		F	1917–20
1918	Johnny Gray		G	
1918	Jimmie Greer		G	
1919	Al DeViney		F	1917–20
1919	Jimmie Greer		G	
1919	George W. McCullough		G	
1919	Louis Smyth		C	
1920	George W. McCullough		G	
1921	George H. "Hook" McCullough		G	
1922	George H. "Hook" McCullough		G	
1922	Phillip Peyton		F	1921–23
1923	Ivan Robertson		F	1922–24
1924	Abb Curtis		G	1922–24
1924	Hubert Foster		G	
1924	Ivan Robertson		F	1922–24
1929	Holly Brock		F	1927–29
1929	Steve Wray		G	1927–29
1930	Alfred Rose		F	1928–30
1933	Jack Gray	6	G	1933–35
1933	Bill Kubricht		C	1931–33
1933	Ed Price		G	1931–33
1934	Jack Gray	6	G	1933–35
1935	Jack Gray	6	G	1933–35
1936	Jack Collins		C	1935–37
1937	Henry Clifton		G	
1939	Bobby Moers	12	G	1938–40
1940	Bobby Moers	23	G	1938–40
1943	John Hargis	27	F	1942–43, 1947
1946	Al Madsen	16	G	1946–49
1947	John Hargis	27	F	1942–43, 1947
1947	Al Madsen	16	G	1946–49
1948	Al Madsen	16	G	1946–49
1948	Slater Martin	15	G	1943, 1947–49
1949	Slater Martin	15	G	1943, 1947–49
1950	Tom Hamilton	13	F	1947–50
1952	James Dowies	32	F	1950–52
1953	Billy Powell	30	F	1952–54
1953	George Scaling	20	G	1951–53
1954	Fred Saunders	32	C	
1956	Raymond Downs	31	F	1955–57

Year	Player	No.	Position	Career
1957	Raymond Downs	31	F	1955–57
1960	Jay Arnette	12	G	1957–60
1961	Donnie Lasiter	10	G	1960–61
1963	Jimmy Gilbert	15	G	1961–63
1963	Mike Humphrey	31	C	1962–64
1965	Larry Franks	40	F	1963–65
1968	Billy Arnold	15	G	1966–68
1968	Gary Overbeck	40	C	1966–68
1972	Larry Robinson	41	F	1972–74
1974	Harry Larrabee	33	G	1972–74
1974	Larry Robinson	41	F	1972–74
1975	Dan Krueger	21	G	1973–76
1976	Dan Krueger	21	G	1973–76
1978	Ron Baxter	12	F	1977–80
1979	Tyrone Branyan	31	F	1978–79
1979	Johnny Moore	00	G	1976–79
1980	Ron Baxter	12	F	1977–80
1981	LaSalle Thompson	42	C	1980–82
1982	LaSalle Thompson	42	C	1980–82
1985	Mike Wacker	41	F	1982–85
1986	John Brownlee	55	C	1985–86
1988	Travis Mays	14	G	1987–90
1989	Travis Mays	14	G	1987–90
1990	Travis Mays	14	G	1987–90
1991	Locksley Collie	42	F	1990–91
1991	Joey Wright	12	G	1989–91
1992	Dexter Cambridge	30	F	1991–92
1992	Terrence Rencher	15	G	1992–95
1994	Albert Burditt	20	F	1991–94
1994	B. J. Tyler	10	PG	1992–94
1995	Roderick Anderson	12	G	1994–95
1995	Terrence Rencher	15	G	1992–95
1996	Reggie Freeman	32	G	1994–97

First-team All-Big 12 Conference

First-team All-Big 12 Conference
Year	Player	No.	Position	Career
1997	Reggie Freeman	32	G	1994–97
1999	Chris Mihm	4	C	1998–2000
1999	Gabe Muoneke	4	C	1998–2000
2000	Chris Mihm	4	C	1998–2000
2003	T. J. Ford	11	PG	2002–03
2004	Brandon Mouton*	3	G	2001–04
2006	LaMarcus Aldridge	23	C	2005–06
2006	P. J. Tucker	2	F	2004–06
2007	Kevin Durant	35	F	2007
2008	D. J. Augustin	14	PG	2007–08
2010	Damion James	5	SF	2007–10
2011	Jordan Hamilton	3	SG/SF	2010–11
2012	J'Covan Brown	14	G	2010–12
2016	Isaiah Taylor	1	PG	2014–16
2023	Marcus Carr	5	G	2021–23

==== Freshman Player of the Year ====
Eight Longhorn freshmen men's basketball players have won conference freshman of the year honors—three players in the Southwest Conference and five players in the Big 12 Conference.

Southwest Conference Freshman of the Year

Southwest Conference Freshman of the Year
Year	Player	No.	Position	Career
1987	Travis Mays	14	G	1987–90
1992	Terrence Rencher	15	G	1992–95
1996	Kris Clack	15	F	1996–99

Big 12 Conference Freshman of the Year

Big 12 Conference Freshman of the Year
Year	Player	No.	Position	Career
2002	T. J. Ford	11	PG	2002–03
2005	Daniel Gibson	1	G	2005–06
2007	Kevin Durant	35	F	2007
2011	Tristan Thompson	13	PF	1996–99
2015	Myles Turner	52	PF	2015

SEC Freshman of the Year

SEC Freshman of the Year
Year	Player	No.	Position	Career
2025	Tre Johnson	20	G	2024–present

==== Conference tournament most valuable player ====
Five Longhorn men's basketball players have won conference tournament most valuable player honors—four players in the Southwest Conference tournament and one player in the Big 12 Conference tournament.

Southwest Conference tournament Most Outstanding Player

Southwest Conference tournament Most Outstanding Player
Year	Player	No.	Position	Career
1992	Dexter Cambridge	30	F	1991–92
1994	B. J. Tyler	10	PG	1992–94
1995	Terrence Rencher	15	G	1992–95
1996	Reggie Freeman	32	G	1994–97

Big 12 Conference tournament Most Valuable Player

Big 12 Conference tournament Most Valuable Player
Year	Player	No.	Position	Career
2007	Kevin Durant	35	F	2007
2021	Matt Coleman III	2	G	2017–21
2023	Dylan Disu	1	F	2021–present

=== Professional basketball ===
==== NBA draft history ====
As of July 30, 2021, 48 Longhorn men's basketball players have been selected in the NBA draft in the history of the program. Of these, 19 were selected in the first round, and 13 were selected in the second round. Among Big 12 programs, Texas trails only Kansas (33) in the number of players drafted in the first round all-time.

Since 1997, Texas has had 23 players drafted overall; of these, 15 were drafted in the first round. Among Big 12 programs, Texas trails only Kansas (34 picks overall, 22 first-round picks) in the numbers of players drafted overall and in the first round during this period. The 15 Longhorn players drafted in the first round from 1997 to 2021 exceed the all-time numbers of first-round picks at each Big 12 school but Kansas.

Longhorn NBA draft selections by year
Year	Round	Pick	Overall	Player	Team
1957	6	4	44	Raymond Downs	St. Louis Hawks
1960	2	1	9	Jay Arnette	Cincinnati Royals
1961	7	4	63	Albert Almanza	Los Angeles Lakers
1965	14	4	100	Larry Franks	Cincinnati Royals
1973	8	12	132	B. G. Brosterhous	Chicago Bulls
1974	4	5	59	Larry Robinson	Houston Rockets
1976	8	10	132	Dan Krueger	Houston Rockets
1978	5	3	91	Gary Goodner	Houston Rockets
1978	6	4	114	Jim Krivacs	Kansas City Kings
1979	2	21	43	Johnny Moore	Seattle SuperSonics
1979	7	18	146	Tryone Branyan	San Antonio Spurs
1980	4	22	91	Ron Baxter	Los Angeles Lakers
1982	1	5	5	LaSalle Thompson	Kansas City Kings
1984	8	9	171	Bill Wendlandt	Denver Nuggets
1985	6	16	132	Carlton Cooper	Dallas Mavericks
1985	7	12	151	Mike Wacker	Utah Jazz
1986	4	8	78	John Brownlee	Los Angeles Clippers
1987	5	14	106	Patrick Fairs	Washington Bullets
1987	7	4	142	Raynard Davis	San Antonio Spurs
1990	1	14	14	Travis Mays	Sacramento Kings
1990	1	26	26	Lance Blanks	Detroit Pistons
1991	2	23	50	Joey Wright	Phoenix Suns
1994	1	20	20	B. J. Tyler	Philadelphia 76ers
1994	2	26	53	Albert Burditt	Houston Rockets

Year	Round	Pick	Overall	Player	Team
1995	2	3	32	Terrence Rencher	Washington Bullets
1999	2	26	55	Kris Clack	Boston Celtics
2000	1	7	7	Chris Mihm	Chicago Bulls^{1}
2002	2	19	48	Chris Owens	Milwaukee Bucks^{2}
2003	1	8	8	T. J. Ford	Milwaukee Bucks
2004	2	8	37	Royal Ivey	Atlanta Hawks
2006	1	2	2	LaMarcus Aldridge	Chicago Bulls^{3}
2006	2	5	35	P. J. Tucker	Toronto Raptors
2006	2	12	42	Daniel Gibson	Cleveland Cavaliers
2007	1	2	2	Kevin Durant	Seattle SuperSonics
2008	1	9	9	D. J. Augustin	Charlotte Bobcats
2010	1	19	19	Avery Bradley	Boston Celtics
2010	1	24	24	Damion James	Atlanta Hawks^{4}
2010	2	2	32	Dexter Pittman	Miami Heat
2011	1	4	4	Tristan Thompson	Cleveland Cavaliers
2011	1	26	26	Jordan Hamilton	Dallas Mavericks^{5}
2011	1	29	29	Cory Joseph	San Antonio Spurs
2015	1	11	11	Myles Turner	Indiana Pacers
2017	1	22	22	Jarrett Allen	Brooklyn Nets
2018	1	6	6	Mohamed Bamba	Orlando Magic
2019	1	8	8	Jaxson Hayes	Atlanta Hawks^{6}
2021	1	19	19	Kai Jones	New York Knicks^{7}
2021	2	13	43	Greg Brown	New Orleans Pelicans^{8}
2021	2	28	58	Jericho Sims	New York Knicks
2025	1	6	6	Tre Johnson	Washington Wizards
2026	1	15	15	Dailyn Swain	Chicago Bulls

^{1}Traded to Cleveland Cavaliers on Draft night.
^{2}Traded to Memphis Grizzlies on Draft night.
^{3}Traded to Portland Trail Blazers on Draft night.
^{4}Traded to New Jersey Nets on Draft night.
^{5}Traded to Denver Nuggets on Draft night.
^{6}Traded to New Orleans Pelicans on Draft night.
^{7}Traded to Charlotte Hornets on Draft night.
^{8}Traded to Portland Trail Blazers on Draft night.

==== NBA players ====
As of July 2, 2026, 43 Texas players have played in the NBA in league history. Of these, 20 played at Texas under Rick Barnes. Eight Longhorn players currently play in the NBA.

All-time NBA players

All-time Texas NBA players
Player	Draft year	Round	Pick (Overall)	NBA career	Teams
John Hargis				1949–51	Anderson Duffey Packers (NBL) (1947–49); Anderson Packers (1949–50); Fort Wayne Pistons (1950); Tri-Cities Blackhawks (1950–51)
Danny Wagner				1949	Flint Dow A.C.'s (NBL) (1947–48); Sheboygan Red Skins (NBL) (1948–49); Sheboygan Red Skins (1949)
Slater Martin				1949–60	Minneapolis Lakers (1949–56); New York Knicks (1956); St. Louis Hawks (1956–60)
Jay Arnette	1960	2	1st (9th)	1963–65	Cincinnati Royals (1963–65)
Johnny Moore	1979	2	21st (43rd)	1980–90	San Antonio Spurs (1980–87); New Jersey Nets (1987); San Antonio Spurs (1989–90)
LaSalle Thompson	1982	1	5th (5th)	1982–97	Kansas City Kings (1982–85); Sacramento Kings (1985–89); Indiana Pacers (1989–95); Philadelphia 76ers (1996); Denver Nuggets (1996–97); Indiana Pacers (1997)
Alvin Heggs	1989	undrafted		1995	Houston Rockets (1995)
Travis Mays	1990	1	14th (14th)	1990–93	Sacramento Kings (1990–91); Atlanta Hawks (1991–93)
Lance Blanks	1990	1	26th (26th)	1990–93	Detroit Pistons (1990–92); Minnesota Timberwolves (1992–93)
Dexter Cambridge	1992	undrafted		1993	Dallas Mavericks (1993)
B. J. Tyler	1994	1	20th (20th)	1994–95	Philadelphia 76ers (1994–95)
Terrence Rencher	1995	2	3rd (32nd)	1995–96	Miami Heat (1995–96); Phoenix Suns (1996)
Chris Mihm	2000	1	7th (7th)	2000–09	Cleveland Cavaliers (2000–03); Boston Celtics (2003–04); Los Angeles Lakers (2004–06, 2007–09)
Maurice Evans	2001	undrafted		2001–12	Minnesota Timberwolves (2001–02); Sacramento Kings (2004–05); Detroit Pistons (2005–06); Los Angeles Lakers (2006–07); Orlando Magic (2007–08); Atlanta Hawks (2008–11); Washington Wizards (2011–12)
Chris Owens	2002	2	19th (48th)	2003	Memphis Grizzlies (2003)
T. J. Ford	2003	1	8th (8th)	2003–12	Milwaukee Bucks (2003–04, 2005–06); Toronto Raptors (2006–08); Indiana Pacers (2008–11); San Antonio Spurs (2011–12)
Royal Ivey	2004	2	8th (37th)	2004–14	Atlanta Hawks (2004–07); Milwaukee Bucks (2007–08); Philadelphia 76ers (2008–10); Milwaukee Bucks (2010); Oklahoma City Thunder (2010–12); Philadelphia 76ers (2012–13); Oklahoma City Thunder (2013–14)
James Thomas	2004	undrafted		2005–06	Portland Trail Blazers (2005); Atlanta Hawks (2005); Philadelphia 76ers (2005); Chicago Bulls (2006)
LaMarcus Aldridge	2006	1	2nd (2nd)	2006–22	Portland Trail Blazers (2006–15); San Antonio Spurs (2015–21); Brooklyn Nets (2021–22)
P. J. Tucker	2006	2	5th (35th)	2006–07, 2012–25	Toronto Raptors (2006–07); Phoenix Suns (2012–17); Toronto Raptors (2017); Houston Rockets (2017–21); Milwaukee Bucks (2021); Miami Heat (2021–22); Philadelphia 76ers (2022–23); Los Angeles Clippers (2023–24); New York Knicks (2025)
Daniel Gibson	2006	2	12th (42nd)	2006–13	Cleveland Cavaliers (2006–13)
Kevin Durant	2007	1	2nd (2nd)	2007–present	Seattle SuperSonics (2007–08); Oklahoma City Thunder (2008–16); Golden State Warriors (2016–19); Brooklyn Nets (2019–23); Phoenix Suns (2023–25); Houston Rockets (2025–present)
D. J. Augustin	2008	1	9th (9th)	2008–22	Charlotte Bobcats (2008–12); Indiana Pacers (2012–13); Toronto Raptors (2013); Chicago Bulls (2013–14); Detroit Pistons (2014–15); Oklahoma City Thunder (2015–16); Denver Nuggets (2016); Orlando Magic (2016–20); Milwaukee Bucks (2020–21); Houston Rockets (2021–22); Los Angeles Lakers (2022)
Avery Bradley	2010	1	19th (19th)	2010–22	Boston Celtics (2010–17); Detroit Pistons (2017–18); Los Angeles Clippers (2018–19); Memphis Grizzlies (2019); Los Angeles Lakers (2019–20); Miami Heat (2020–21); Houston Rockets (2021); Los Angeles Lakers (2021–22)
Damion James	2010	1	24th (24th)	2010–14	New Jersey Nets (2010–12); Brooklyn Nets (2012–13); San Antonio Spurs (2014)
Dexter Pittman	2010	2	2nd (32nd)	2010–14	Miami Heat (2010–13); Memphis Grizzlies (2013); Atlanta Hawks (2014)
Tristan Thompson	2011	1	4th (4th)	2011–25	Cleveland Cavaliers (2011–20); Boston Celtics (2020–21); Sacramento Kings (2021–22); Indiana Pacers (2022); Chicago Bulls (2022); Los Angeles Lakers (2023); Cleveland Cavaliers (2023–25)
Jordan Hamilton	2011	1	26th (26th)	2011–16	Denver Nuggets (2011–14); Houston Rockets (2014); Los Angeles Clippers (2014–15); New Orleans Pelicans (2016)
Cory Joseph	2011	1	29th (29th)	2011–25	San Antonio Spurs (2011–15); Toronto Raptors (2015–17); Indiana Pacers (2017–19); Sacramento Kings (2019–21); Detroit Pistons (2021–23); Golden State Warriors (2023–24); Orlando Magic (2024–25)
Myles Turner	2015	1	11th (11th)	2015–present	Indiana Pacers (2015–25); Milwaukee Bucks (2025–present)
Sheldon McClellan	2016	undrafted		2016–17	Washington Wizards (2016–17)
Isaiah Taylor	2016	undrafted		2017–18	Houston Rockets (2017); Atlanta Hawks (2017–18)
Jarrett Allen	2017	1	22nd (22nd)	2017–present	Brooklyn Nets (2017–21); Cleveland Cavaliers (2021–present)
Mohamed Bamba	2018	1	6th (6th)	2018–present	Orlando Magic (2018–23); Los Angeles Lakers (2023); Philadelphia 76ers (2023–24); Los Angeles Clippers (2024–25); New Orleans Pelicans (2025); Toronto Raptors (2025–2026); Utah Jazz (2026–present)
Jaxson Hayes	2019	1	8th (8th)	2019–present	New Orleans Pelicans (2019–23); Los Angeles Lakers (2023–26); Utah Jazz (2026–present)
Kai Jones	2021	1	19th (19th)	2021–25	Charlotte Hornets (2021–23); Los Angeles Clippers (2024–25); Dallas Mavericks (2025)
Greg Brown	2021	2	13th (43rd)	2021–24	Portland Trail Blazers (2021–23); Dallas Mavericks (2023–24)
Jericho Sims	2021	2	28th (58th)	2021–present	New York Knicks (2021–25); Milwaukee Bucks (2025–present)
Donovan Williams	2022	undrafted		2023	Atlanta Hawks (2023)
Timmy Allen	2023	undrafted		2024	Memphis Grizzlies (2024)
Jaylon Tyson	2024	1	20th (20th)	2024–present	Cleveland Cavaliers (2024–present)
Tre Johnson	2025	1	6th (6th)	2025–present	Washington Wizards (2025–present)
Jayson Kent	2025	undrafted		2026	Portland Trail Blazers (2026–present)
Dailyn Swain	2026	1	15th (15th)	2026–present	Chicago Bulls (2026–present)

Current NBA players

Texas players currently in the NBA
Player	Draft year	Round	Pick (Overall)	NBA career	Current team
Kevin Durant	2007	1	2nd (2nd)	2007–present	Houston Rockets (2025–present)
Myles Turner	2015	1	11th (11th)	2015–present	Milwaukee Bucks (2025–present)
Jarrett Allen	2017	1	22nd (22nd)	2017–present	Cleveland Cavaliers (2021–present)
Mo Bamba	2018	1	6th (6th)	2018–present	Utah Jazz (2026–present)
Jaxson Hayes	2019	1	8th (8th)	2019–present	Utah Jazz (2026–present)
Jericho Sims	2021	2	28th (58th)	2021–present	Milwaukee Bucks (2025–present)
Jaylon Tyson	2024	1	20th (20th)	2024–present	Cleveland Cavaliers (2024–present)
Tre Johnson	2025	1	6th (6th)	2025–present	Washington Wizards (2025–present)
Jayson Kent	2025	undrafted		2026–present	Portland Trail Blazers (2026–present)

==== Non-NBA professional players ====
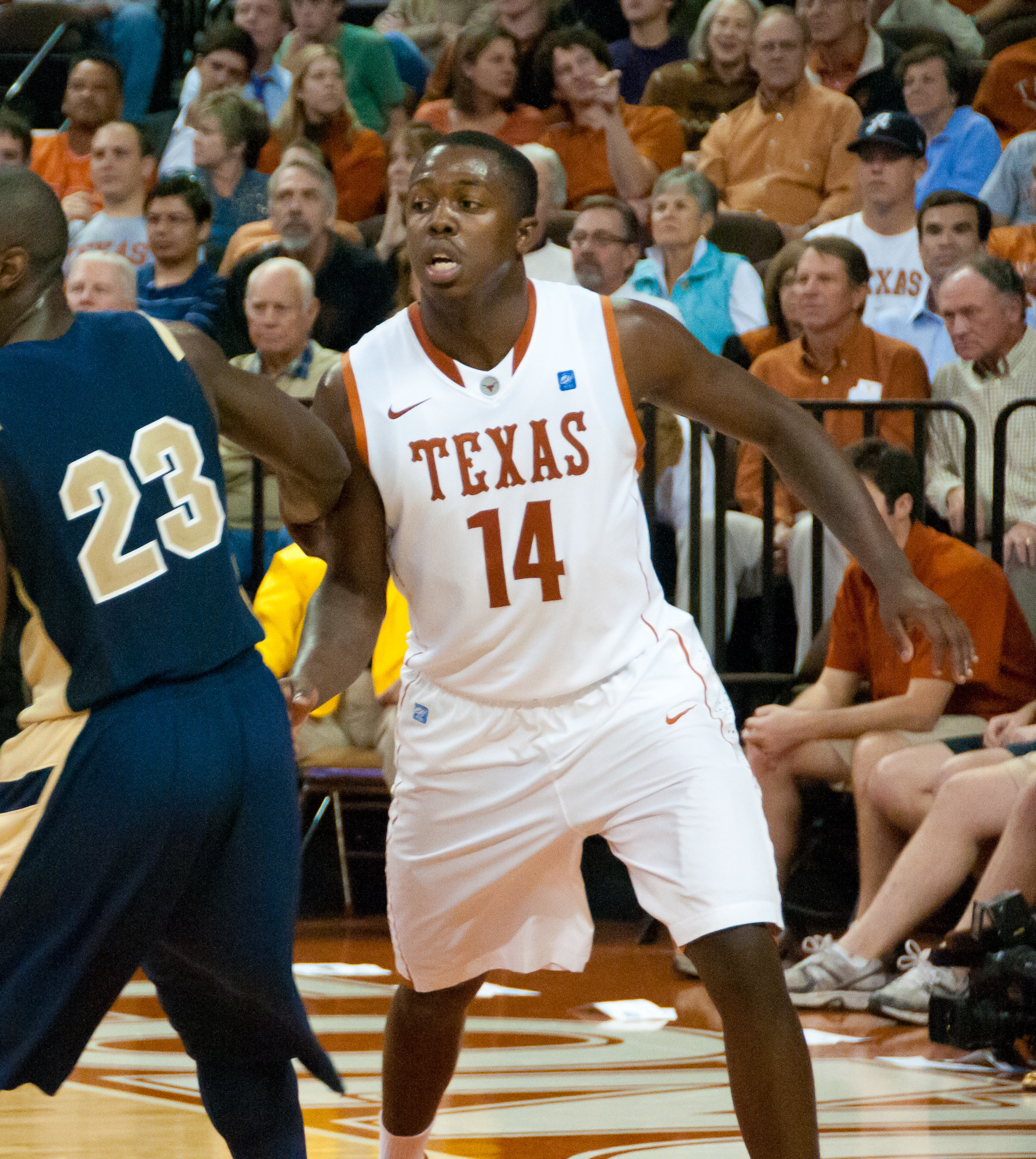
J'Covan Brown

All-time non-NBA professional players

Current non-NBA professional players

- Andrew Jones (born 1997), Austrian Basketball Superliga
- Sir'Jabari Rice (born 1998), Czech Republic National Basketball League
- Ze'Rik Onyema (born 2002), Finland Korisliiga
- Marcus Carr (born 1999), German Basketball Bundesliga
- Julian Larry (born 2002), German ProA
- Elijah Mitrou-Long (born 1996), Greek Basketball League
- Matt Coleman III (born 1998), Israeli Basketball Premier League
- Kadin Shedrick (born 2001), Israeli Basketball Premier League
- Timmy Allen (born 2000), Italian Lega Basket Serie A
- J'Covan Brown (born 1990), Turkish Basketbol Süper Ligi
- Christian Bishop (born 2000), Turkish Basketbol Süper Ligi
- Kai Jones (born 2001), Turkish Basketbol Süper Ligi

=== Olympians ===
Four Longhorn men's basketball players have competed in the Olympic Games in men's basketball on six occasions, with three players winning gold medals.

Kevin Durant was the leading scorer on the United States men's basketball team that won the gold medal in the 2012 Olympics. Durant's 156 total points during the Olympic tournament set a record for most points scored by an American basketball player in Olympic competition, surpassing the record previously set by Spencer Haywood in the 1968 Olympics by 11 points. Durant also set the U.S. record for most made three-point shots in an Olympic competition with 34 (on 65 attempts). In addition to leading the U.S. team in scoring, he finished second on the team in rebounding, first in blocked shots, and second in steals.

In the 2016 Olympics, Durant again led the U.S. men's team in scoring with 155 total points—one point fewer than his U.S. Olympic record from 2012—and in minutes played. He finished second on the team in steals, third in assists, and fourth in rebounding. Durant converted 25 three-point shots on only 43 attempts (.581).

Longhorns in the Olympics by year
Year	Player	Country	Medal
1956	Gilbert Ford	United States	Gold medal
1960	Jay Arnette	United States	Gold medal
1960	Albert Almanza	Mexico	—
1964	Albert Almanza	Mexico	—
2012	Kevin Durant	United States	Gold medal
2016	Kevin Durant	United States	Gold medal
2020	Kevin Durant	United States	Gold medal
2024	Kevin Durant	United States	Gold medal

=== Coaching honors and awards ===
==== National Coach of the Year honors ====
Abe Lemons (1976–82) won the NABC National Coach of the Year award following his second season at Texas, a season that saw the Longhorns finish 26–5, win a share of the Southwest Conference title, and win the 1978 NIT Championship. Texas had finished just 9–17 two years earlier in Leon Black's last season as head coach.

Rodney Terry was named Sporting News National Coach of the year for the 2022–23 season, becoming the first Texas coach to win the award since it was introduced in 1964.

==== John R. Wooden Legends of Coaching Award ====
The Wooden Legends of Coaching Award is a lifetime achievement award established prior to the 1998–99 season. Selection for the award depends upon a number of on- and off-court factors, from coaching success and philosophy to evidence of good character to graduation rates. Rick Barnes won the Wooden Legends of Coaching Award following the 2008–09 season.

==== Conference Coach of the Year honors ====
Abe Lemons was recognized as the Southwest Conference Coach of the Year for the 1977–78 season, the season that saw him win the NABC National Coach of the Year award. Tom Penders received Southwest Conference Coach of the Year honors in 1994 and 1995, and Rick Barnes was named Big 12 Coach of the Year in 1999, 2003, 2008, and 2014.

==== District-level Coach of the Year honors ====
Rick Barnes won recognition as NABC District 9 Coach of the Year in five seasons (1999, 2001, 2003, 2008, 2014). Barnes was also a four-time recipient of USBWA District VII Coach of the Year honors (1999, 2001, 2003, 2011).

== Records ==
Team records include single-season, single-game, and NCAA tournament records for the Texas program. Program records for individual players include career totals and averages as well as single-season totals and averages.

All records are current as of the end of the 2024–25 season.

=== Team records ===
==== Single-season records ====
Games

- Longest winning streak: 23 (1923–24, entire season)
- Longest winning streak (conference): 20 (1923–24, entire season)
- Longest losing streak: 15 (Dec. 4, 1954 to Feb. 3, 1955)
- Longest losing streak (conference): 12 (Jan. 24, 1983 to Mar. 5, 1983)
- Most games played: 38 in 2007–08 (31–7)
- Most wins: 31 in 2007–08 (31–7)
- Fewest wins^{1}: 4 in 1954–55, 1958–59 (4–20)
- Most wins without a loss: 23 in 1923–24
- Most losses: 22 in 1982–83 (6–22)
- Fewest losses: 0 in 1913–14 (11–0), 1914–15 (14–0), 1915–16 (12–0), 1923–24 (23–0)

Scoring

- Most points scored: 3,205 in 1988–89 (34 games)
- Highest scoring average per game: 94.3 in 1988–89 (34 games)
- Highest average scoring margin: +14.9 in 2005–06 (75.2 to 60.3)
- Fewest points scored^{2}: 1,179 in 1949–50 (24 games)
- Lowest scoring average per game^{2}: 46.8 in 1950–51 (1,264 in 27 games)
- Lowest average scoring margin^{2}: −12.8 in 1954–55 (−306 in 24 games)
- Most field goals made: 1,173 in 1991–92 (35 games)
- Most field goals attempted: 2,537 in 1991–92 (35 games)
- Highest field-goal percentage: .507 in 1984–85 (745 of 1,468)
- Most 3-point field goals made^{3}: 309 in 2007–08 (38 games)
- Most 3-point field goals attempted^{3}: 800 in 2007–08 (38 games)
- Highest 3-point field-goal percentage^{3}: .389 in 2006–07 (308 of 792)
- Fewest field goals made^{2}: 445 in 1949–50 (24 games)
- Fewest field goals attempted^{2}: 1,180 in 1952–53 (21 games)
- Lowest field-goal percentage^{2}: .329 in 1951–52 (458 of 1,394)
- Fewest 3-Point field goals made^{3}: 309 in 2007–08 (38 games)
- Fewest 3-Point field goals attempted^{3}: 800 in 2007–08 (38 games)
- Lowest 3-point field-goal percentage^{3}: .292 in 2016–17 (181 of 620)
- Most free throws made: 722 in 1989–90 (33 games)
- Most free throws attempted: 996 in 1989–90 (33 games)
- Highest free-throw percentage: .768 in 1968–69 (436 of 568)
- Fewest free throws made^{4}: 261 in 2019–20 (31 games)
- Fewest free throws attempted^{5}: 381 in 2019–20 (31 games)
- Lowest free-throw percentage: .570 in 1982–83 (302 of 540)

Defense

- Fewest points allowed (since 1947–48): 1,079 in 1947–48 (25 games)
- Fewest points allowed (since 1985–86): 1,905 in 1985–86 (31 games)
- Lowest scoring average per game allowed (since 1947–48):
- Lowest scoring average per game allowed (since 1985–86): 60.3 in 2014–15 (2,049 in 35 games)
- Fewest field goals allowed (since 1947–48): 367 in 1947–48 (25 games)
- Fewest field goals allowed (since 1985–86):
- Fewest field goals attempted allowed (since 1947–48):
- Fewest field goals attempted allowed (since 1985–86):
- Lowest field-goal percentage allowed^{2}: .325 in 1951–52 (431 of 1,328)
- Fewest 3-point field goals allowed:
- Fewest 3-point field goals attempted allowed:
- Lowest 3-point field-goal percentage allowed: .295 in 2010–11 (162 of 550)
- Most points allowed: 2,983 in 1991–92 (35 games)
- Highest scoring average per game allowed: 87.7 in 1988–89 (2,981 in 34 games)
- Most field goals allowed: 1,149 in 1988–89 (34 games)
- Most field goals attempted allowed:
- Highest field-goal percentage allowed:
- Most 3-point field goals allowed:
- Most 3-point field goals Attempted allowed:
- Highest 3-point field-goal percentage allowed:
- Most turnovers forced^{6}: 784 in 1993–94 (34 games)
- Highest turnovers forced Average per game^{6}:
- Fewest turnovers forced^{6}:
- Lowest turnovers forced average per game^{6}:
- Highest turnover margin^{6}: +8.2 in 1994–95 (14.3 to 22.5)
- Lowest turnover margin^{6}:

Rebounds

- Most rebounds: 1,498 in 2005–06 (37 games)
- Highest rebounding average per game: 48.1 in 1970–71 (1,154 rebounds in 24 games)

Assists

- Most assists^{7}: 568 in 1993–94 (34 games)
- Highest assists average per game^{7}: 17.0 in 1978–79 (493 assists in 29 games)

Blocks

- Most blocked shots^{8}: 265 in 2014–15 (34 games)
- Highest blocked shots average per game^{8}: 7.79 in 2014–15 (34 games)

Steals

- Most steals^{8}: 453 in 1993–94 (34 games)
- Highest steals average per game^{8}: 13.32 in 1993–94 (34 games)

Personal fouls

- Most personal fouls: 783 in 1988–89 (34 games)
- Highest personal fouls average per game: 24.1 in 1995–96 (747 fouls in 31 games)

Turnovers

- Fewest turnovers^{9}:
- Most turnovers^{9}:

^{1}Since 1914–15, the program's first season in the SWC.
^{2}Since 1949–50 season.
^{3}Since 1986–87 season.
^{4}Since 1932–33 season.
^{5}Since 1960–61 season.
^{6}Since 1972–73 season.
^{7}Since 1978–79 season.
^{8}Since 1979–80 season.
^{9}Since 1972–73 season.

==== Single-game records ====
Longest game

- Most overtimes: 4 at TCU, Jan. 7, 1961 (L 94–95)

Scoring

- Most points: 148 vs. Northern Montana, Nov. 27, 1978 (W 148–71)
- Most points scored in a road game: 136 at Oral Roberts, Dec. 1, 1992 (W 136–97)
- Most points scored in a half: 74 (both halves) vs. Northern Montana, Nov. 27, 1978 (148–71)
- Largest margin of victory: 101 vs. San Marcos Baptist, Jan. 10, 1916 (102–1)
- Largest margin of victory in a road game: 63 vs. Southwest Texas, Feb. 15, 1913 (70–7)
- Most points scored in a loss: 125 at Texas Tech, Feb. 20, 1994 (125–128^{2OT})
- Largest margin of defeat: 50 at No. 1 UCLA, Feb. 20, 1915 (65–115)
- Largest margin of defeat in a home game: 36 vs. Arkansas, Jan. 20, 1945 (38–74)
- Fewest points scored^{1}: 29 at Texas A&M, Jan. 31, 1951 (L 29–32) and Jan. 16, 1959 (L 29–73)
- Most points, both teams: 253 at Texas Tech, Feb. 20, 1994 (L 125–128^{2OT})
- Fewest points, both teams:
- Most field goals made: 56 vs. Northern Montana, Nov. 27, 1978 (W 148–71)
- Most field goals attempted:
- Highest field-goal percentage^{2}: .694 at Tulsa, December 19, 1959 (25 of 36)
- Highest field-goal percentage in a half^{3}: .800 at Arkansas, Jan. 24, 1983 (12 of 15, 1st half)
- Fewest field goals made^{4}: 4 vs. Arkansas, March 10, 1936 (L 16–27)
- Fewest field goals attempted^{5}: 34
- Lowest field-goal percentage: .184 at TCU, Feb. 12, 1951 (9 of 49)
- Lowest field-goal percentage in a half:
- Most 3-point field goals made^{6}: 18 vs. Kansas State, Jan. 12, 1997
- Most 3-point field goal attempts^{6}: 42 vs. The Citadel, Nov. 16 2018
- Highest 3-point field-goal percentage (minimum 10 attempts)^{6}: .769 vs. DePaul, Jan. 19, 1991 (10 of 13)
- Fewest 3-point field goals made^{6}: 0, seven times (last at UC Santa Barbara, Dec. 18, 1990)
- Fewest 3-point field-goal attempts^{6}: 0 at TCU, Feb. 24, 1988
- Lowest 3-point field-goal percentage (minimum 10 attempts)^{6}: .056 vs. Oklahoma State, Feb. 9, 2013 (1 of 18)
- Most free throws made: 40 vs. Baylor, Mar. 7, 1991; vs. Texas A&M, Feb. 22, 1955
- Most free-throw attempts: 50 vs. Baylor, Mar. 7, 1991; at Texas A&M, Jan. 12, 1954; vs. Oral Roberts, Dec. 8, 1987
- Fewest free throws made: 2 at Oklahoma, Mar. 3, 2020; vs. Baylor, Mar. 14, 2014; vs. Kansas, Jan. 19, 2013; at UCLA, Dec. 2, 2007; at Providence, Dec. 31, 1996; vs. SMU, Jan. 23, 1985; vs. Rice, Jan. 28, 1981; at South Carolina, Dec. 23, 1980
- Fewest free-throw attempts: 3 vs. Rice, Jan. 28, 1981
- Highest free-throw percentage (minimum 10 attempts)^{6}: 1.000 at Mississippi, Dec. 2, 1972 (16 of 16); vs. SMU, Jan. 20, 1996 (14 of 14); at Oklahoma, Feb. 6, 2008 (11 of 11)
- Lowest free-throw percentage (minimum 10 attempts): .214 vs. Baylor, Feb. 2, 2021 (3 of 14)

Defense

- Most turnovers forced^{8}: 36 vs. Southwest Texas, Dec. 7, 1994
- Fewest turnovers forced^{8}:
- Highest turnover margin^{8}:
- Lowest turnover margin^{8}:

Rebounds

- Most rebounds^{3}: 70 at Oral Roberts, Dec. 1, 1992
- Fewest rebounds^{3}: 15 vs. Rice, Feb. 10, 1985; vs. San Diego State, Dec. 20, 1983
- Most offensive rebounds^{3}:
- Most defensive rebounds^{3}:
- Highest rebound margin^{3}: +39 vs. Samford, Nov. 16, 2005 (54–15)

Assists

- Most assists^{9}: 37 vs. Northern Montana, Nov. 27, 1978
- Fewest assists^{9}: 2 vs. Nevada, Mar. 17, 2005

Blocks

- Most blocked shots^{10}: 15 vs. Appalachian State, Dec. 15, 2015

Steals

- Most steals^{10}: 22 vs. TCU, Mar. 12, 1994; vs. Baylor, Feb. 15, 1994

Personal fouls

- Most personal fouls^{3}: 38 at Nebraska, Jan. 3, 1996; at Louisville, Dec. 9, 1995
- Fewest personal fouls^{3}: 5 vs. TCU, Feb. 3, 1948

Turnovers

- Most turnovers^{8}:
- Fewest turnovers^{8}:

^{1}Since 1949–50 season.
^{2}Since 1959–60 season.
^{3}Since 1965–66 season.
^{4}Since 1932–33 season.
^{5}Since 1961–62 season.
^{6}Since 1986–87 season.
^{7}Since 1960–61 season.
^{8}Since 1972–73 season.
^{9}Since 1978–79 season.
^{10}Since 1979–80 season.

==== NCAA tournament records ====
Scoring

- Most points: 102 vs. Xavier, 1990
- Largest margin of victory: 21 vs. North Carolina State, 2006; vs. UNC Asheville, 2003
- Most field goals: 36 vs. Iowa, 1992
- Most field goals attempted: 79 vs. Oklahoma, 1979; vs. DePaul, 1960
- Highest field-goal percentage: .610 vs. Indiana State (30 of 49), 1988
- Most 3-point field goals made: 13 vs. Miami (FL), 2008; vs. Iowa, 1992
- Most 3-point field goals attempted: 31 vs. Iowa, 1992
- Highest 3-point field-goal percentage (min. 10 attempts): .733 vs. Princeton (11 of 15), 2004
- Most free throws made: 31 vs. Xavier, 1990
- Most free throws attempted: 45 vs. Georgia, 1990
- Highest free-throw percentage (min. 10 attempts): .962 vs. New Mexico State (25 of 26), 2007

Rebounds

- Most rebounds: 52 vs. Connecticut, 2003
- Highest rebound margin:

Assists

- Most assists: 25 vs. Western Kentucky, 1994

Blocks

- Most blocked shots: 9 vs. Oakland, 2011

Steals

- Most steals: 16 vs. Michigan, 1996

=== Individual records ===
==== Career leaders ====
Totals

Rank	Points	3-pt. FGs^{1}	Rebounds	Assists^{2}	Steals^{3}	Blocks^{4}
1.	2,306; Terrence Rencher; 1992–95	976; A. J. Abrams; 2006–09	1,318; Damion James; 2007–10	714; Johnny Moore; 1976–79	255; Terrence Rencher; 1992–95	264; Chris Mihm; 1998–2000
2.	2,279; Travis Mays; 1987–90	739; Reggie Freeman; 1994–97	1,077; James Thomas; 2001–04	527; T. J. Ford; 2002–03	239; Kris Clack; 1996–99	236; Albert Burditt; 1991–94
3.	1,969; A. J. Abrams; 2006–09	664; Travis Mays; 1987–90	1,027; LaSalle Thompson; 1980–82	480; B. J. Tyler; 1992–94	202; B. J. Tyler; 1992–94	220; Cameron Ridley; 2013–16
4.	1,958; Reggie Freeman; 1994–97	588; B. J. Tyler; 1992–94	945; Chris Mihm; 1998–2000	477; Matt Coleman III; 2017–21	198; Lance Blanks; 1989–90	212; Prince Ibeh; 2012–16
5.	1,917; Damion James; 2007–10	585; Brandy Perryman; 1995–98	916; Ron Baxter; 1977–80	457; Alex Broadway; 1985–88	193; Reggie Freeman; 1994–97	189; Connor Atchley; 2006–09
6.	1,897; Ron Baxter; 1977–80	509; Brandon Mouton; 2001–04	897; Albert Burditt; 1991–94	452; D. J. Augustin; 2007–08	179; A. J. Abrams; 2006–09	168; Brad Buckman; 2003–06
7.	1,819; Joey Wright; 1988–91	486; Terrence Rencher; 1992–95	808; Brad Buckman; 2003–06	440; Terrence Rencher; 1992–95	170; Albert Burditt; 1991–94	163; Damion James; 2007–10
8.	1,673; Jim Krivacs; 1977–79	466; J'Covan Brown; 2010–12	771; Kris Clack; 1996–99	415; Isaiah Taylor; 2014–16	165; Roderick Anderson; 1994–95	159; Chris Owens; 1998–01
9.	1,592; Kris Clack; 1996–99	452; Daniel Gibson; 2005–06	749; Jonathan Holmes; 2011–15	378; Dan Krueger^{5} 1973–76	165; Joey Wright; 1988–91	145; LaSalle Thompson; 1980–82
10.	1,582; Brandon Mouton; 2001–04	443; Sydmill Harris; 2002–05	720; Cameron Ridley; 2012–16	378; Justin Mason; 2007–10	163; Kerwin Roach; 2015–19	124; Dexter Pittman; 2006–09

^{1} Since 1986–87 season.
^{2} Since 1972–73 season.
^{3} Since 1979–80 season.
^{4} Since 1979–80 season.
^{5} Assist numbers missing for 12 games for Dan Krueger.

Averages

Rank	Points per game^{1}	FG %^{2}	3-pt. FG %	3-pt. FGs per game^{3}	Rebounds per game^{4}	Assists per game^{5}	Steals per game^{6}	Blocks per game^{7}	FT %^{8}
1.	25.8; Kevin Durant; 2007	.623; Dexter Pittman; 2007–10	.415; Joey Wright; 1989–91	2.84; B. J. Tyler; 1992–94	11.8; LaSalle Thompson; 1980–82	7.98; T. J. Ford; 2002–03	3.00; Lance Blanks; 1989–90	3.70; Mohamed Bamba; 2018	.897; Brandy Perryman; 1995–98
2.	22.3; Raymond Downs; 1955–57	.586; LaMarcus Aldridge; 2005–06	.404; Kevin Durant; 2007	2.70; A. J. Abrams; 2006–09	9.8; Chris Mihm; 1998–2000	6.38; Johnny Moore; 1976–79	2.80; Roderick Anderson; 1994–95	2.75; Chris Mihm; 1998–2000	.869; Jim Krivacs; 1977–79
3.	21.5; Larry Robinson; 1972–74	.585; Alvin Heggs; 1988–89	.404; Brian Boddicker; 2001–04	2.57; Daniel Gibson; 2005–06	9.7; Larry Robinson; 1972–74	6.32; B. J. Tyler; 1992–94	2.66; B. J. Tyler; 1992–94	2.62; Myles Turner; 2015	.867; J'Covan Brown; 2010–12
4.	20.0; Lance Blanks; 1989–90	.571; Mike Wacker; 1981–82, 1985	.402; D. J. Augustin; 2007–08	2.53; Maurice Evans; 2001	9.3; Damion James; 2007–10	6.19; D. J. Augustin; 2007–08	2.09; T. J. Ford; 2002–03	2.39; Tristan Thompson; 2011	.864; A. J. Abrams; 2006–09
5.	19.8; B. J. Tyler; 1992–94	.564; Albert Burditt; 1991–94	.401; Kenton Paulino; 2003–06	2.36; Lance Blanks; 1989–90	8.8; B. J. Brosterhous; 1971–73	6.14; Roderick Anderson; 1994–95	2.06; Terrence Rencher; 1992–95	2.09; Albert Burditt; 1991–94	.849; Harry Larrabee; 1972–74
6.	19.5; Jim Krivacs; 1977–80	.553; LaSalle Thompson; 1980–82	.399; A. J. Abrams; 2006–09	2.34; Kevin Durant; 2007	8.7; Lynn Howden; 1970–72	5.27; Myck Kabongo; 2012–13	1.99; Kris Clack; 1996–99	2.04; Chris Owens; 2000–02	.841; Dan Krueger; 1973–76
7.	18.8; Joey Wright; 1989–91	.551; John Brownlee; 1985–86	.389; Maurice Evans; 2001	2.11; Jordan Hamilton; 2010–11	8.4; Raymond Downs; 1955–57	4.56; Isaiah Taylor; 2014–16	1.89; Kevin Durant; 2007	1.91; Kevin Durant; 2007	.825; Donnie Lasiter; 1960–61
8.	18.6; Terrence Rencher; 1992–95	.551; Gary Overbeck; 1966–68	.389; Brandon Mouton; 2001–04	1.98; Travis Mays; 1987–90	8.2; P. J. Tucker; 2004–06	4.27; Alex Broadway; 1985–88	1.80; Joey Wright; 1989–91	1.91; Cameron Ridley; 2013–16	.816; Kevin Durant; 2007
9.	18.4; Travis Mays; 1987–90	.538; Noel Stout; 1966–67	.387; Daniel Gibson; 2005–06	1.98; Reggie Freeman; 1994–97	8.0; James Thomas; 2001–04	4.21; Fred Carson; 1980–81	1.62; Ivan Wagner; 1998–2000	1.83; LaMarcus Aldridge; 2005–06	.808; D. J. Augustin; 2007–08
10.	16.9; D. J. Augustin; 2007–08	.535; Joe Fisher; 1962–64	.382; Tony Watson; 2005–06	1.93; Roderick Anderson; 1994–95	8.0; Albert Almanza; 1959–61	3.67; Ivan Wagner; 1998–2000	1.53; Daniel Gibson; 2005–06	1.67; LaSalle Thompson; 1980–82	.803; Sheldon McClellan; 2012–13

^{1} Minimum 500 points.
^{2} Since 1949–50 season. Minimum 600 points.
^{3} Minimum 200 attempts.
^{4} Minimum 450 rebounds.
^{5} Since 1975–76 season.
^{6} Since 1979–80 season.
^{7} Since 1979–80 season.
^{8} Minimum 100 attempts.

==== Single-season leaders ====
Totals

Rank	Points	3-pt. FGs^{1}	Rebounds	Assists^{2}	Steals^{3}	Blocks^{4}
1.	903; Kevin Durant; 2007	120; A. J. Abrams; 2007	393; Damion James; 2008	273; T. J. Ford; 2002	111; Lance Blanks; 1989	111; Mohamed Bamba; 2018
2.	772; Travis Mays; 1990	118; A. J. Abrams; 2008	390; Kevin Durant; 2007	254; T. J. Ford; 2003	101; Roderick Anderson; 1995	92; Chris Owens; 2001
3.	743; Travis Mays; 1989	105; A. J. Abrams; 2009	370; LaSalle Thompson; 1981	242; Johnny Moore; 1979	87; Lance Blanks; 1990	90; Chris Mihm; 1998
4.	731; D. J. Augustin; 2008	101; Daniel Gibson; 2006	365; LaSalle Thompson; 1982	233; D. J. Augustin; 2007	87; B. J. Tyler; 1994	90; Chris Mihm; 2000
5.	695; Reggie Freeman; 1996	99; B. J. Tyler; 1994	363; James Thomas; 2003	229; B. J. Tyler; 1992	82; B. J. Tyler; 1992	89; Myles Turner; 2015
6.	683; J'Covan Brown; 2012	95; Travis Mays; 1990	353; P. J. Tucker; 2006	219; D. J. Augustin; 2008	79; Kris Clack; 1997	86; Tristan Thompson; 2011
7.	681; Jim Krivacs; 1978	95; Travis Mays; 1989	351; Chris Mihm; 1999	214; Johnny Moore; 1978	79; Terrence Rencher; 1994	84; Chris Mihm; 1999
8.	671; Jordan Hamilton; 2011	90; Jordan Hamilton; 2011	350; Damion James; 2010	211; Roderick Anderson; 1995	73; Albert Burditt; 1994	80; Connor Atchley; 2008
9.	671; Lance Blanks; 1989	87; Reggie Freeman; 1996	346; Chris Mihm; 2000	175; B. J. Tyler; 1994	72; T. J. Ford; 2002	76; Cameron Ridley; 2014
10.	658; Tre Johnson; 2025	86; Maurice Evans; 2001	339; LaMarcus Aldridge; 2006	164; Isaiah Taylor; 2016	70; Reggie Freeman; 1996	74; Albert Burditt; 1992

^{1} Since 1986–87 season.
^{2} Since 1972–73 season.
^{3} Since 1979–80 season.
^{4} Since 1979–80 season.

Averages

Rank	Points per game^{1}	FG %^{2}	3-pt. FG %	3-pt. FGs per game^{3}	Rebounds per game^{4}	Assists per game^{5}	Steals per game^{6}	Blocks per game^{7}	FT %^{8}
1.	26.4; Raymond Downs; 1956	.654; Dexter Pittman; 2010	.448; Brian Boddicker; 2004	3.43; A. J. Abrams; 2007	13.5; LaSalle Thompson; 1982	8.34; Johnny Moore; 1979	3.37; Roderick Anderson; 1995	3.70; Mohamed Bamba; 2018	.924; A. J. Abrams; 2007
2.	25.8; Kevin Durant; 2007	.618; Tremaine Wingfield; 1995	.441; D. J. Augustin; 2007	3.11; A. J. Abrams; 2008	12.3; LaSalle Thompson; 1981	8.27; T. J. Ford; 2002	3.26; Lance Blanks; 1989	2.90; Chris Mihm; 1998	.910; Jim Krivacs; 1979
3.	24.1; Travis Mays; 1990	.616; Dexter Pittman; 2009	.439; Brian Boddicker; 2003	3.00; A. J. Abrams; 2009	11.1; Kevin Durant; 2007	7.70; T. J. Ford; 2003	3.11; B. J. Tyler; 1994	2.73; Chris Mihm; 2000	.899; Bobby Puryear; 1959
4.	22.8; B. J. Tyler; 1994	.615; Alvin Heggs; 1988	.429; Joey Wright; 1990	2.91; B. J. Tyler; 1994	11.0; James Thomas; 2003; Lynn Howden; 1971	7.03; Roderick Anderson; 1995	2.64; Lance Blanks; 1990	2.71; Chris Owens; 2001	.896; Brandy Perryman; 1997
5.	22.4; Reggie Freeman; 1996	.613; Joe Fisher; 1964	.429; Tony Watson; 1992	2.88; Travis Mays; 1990	11.0; Chris Mihm; 1999	6.90; Johnny Moore; 1978	2.63; Kris Clack; 1997	2.63; Chris Mihm; 1999	.891; Jim Krivacs; 1978
6.	22.4; Larry Robinson; 1974	.612; Tremaine Wingfield; 1994	.423; A. J. Abrams; 2007	2.81; Reggie Freeman; 1996	10.8; Larry Robinson; 1974	6.66; D. J. Augustin; 2007	2.34; B. J. Tyler; 1992	2.62; Myles Turner; 2015	.883; Brandy Perryman; 1996
7.	22.2; Raymond Downs; 1957	.607; Jericho Sims; 2018	.422; Joey Wright; 1989	2.79; Travis Mays; 1989	10.7; Joe Fisher; 1964	6.54; B. J. Tyler; 1992	2.33; Terrence Rencher; 1995	2.39; Tristan Thompson; 2011	.883; J'Covan Brown; 2010
8.	22.0; Jim Krivacs; 1978	.599; Mike Wacker; 1985	.418; Ivan Wagner; 2000	2.63; Roderick Anderson; 1995	10.5; Chris Mihm; 2000	6.25; B. J. Tyler; 1994	2.32; Terrence Rencher; 1994	2.17; Cameron Ridley; 2014	.878; Dan Krueger; 1974
9.	21.9; Travis Mays; 1989	.590; Albert Burditt; 1994	.413; Connor Atchley; 2008	2.57; Daniel Gibson; 2006	10.5; Mohamed Bamba; 2018	5.88; Johnny Moore; 1977	2.32; Reggie Freeman; 1996	2.15; LaSalle Thompson; 1982	.863; J'Covan Brown; 2012
10.	21.9; Larry Robinson; 1972	.581; John Brownlee; 1985	.413; Brandon Mouton; 2003	2.53; Maurice Evans; 2001	10.3; Damion James; 2008; Damion James; 2010	5.76; D. J. Augustin; 2008	2.21; Roderick Anderson; 1994	2.11; Albert Burditt; 1992; Connor Atchley; 2008	.861; J'Covan Brown; 2011

^{1} Minimum 250 points.

^{2} Since 1949–50 season. Minimum 200 points.
^{3} Minimum 100 attempts.
^{4} Minimum 200 rebounds.
^{5} Since 1975–76 season. Must have played in more than half of season's games.
^{6} Since 1979–80 season. Must have played in more than half of season's games.
^{7} Since 1979–80 season. Must have played in more than half of season's games.

^{8} Minimum 60 attempts.

== See also ==
- Texas Longhorns women's basketball
