= Texas Longhorns men's basketball statistical leaders =

The following lists give individual statistical leaders of the Texas Longhorns men's basketball program in various categories, including points, assists, blocks, rebounds, and steals. Within those areas, the lists identify single-game, single-season, and career leaders. As of the next college basketball season in 2024–25, the Longhorns represent the University of Texas at Austin in the NCAA Division I Southeastern Conference.

Texas began competing in intercollegiate basketball in 1905. However, the school's record book does not generally list records from before the 1950s, as records from before this period are often incomplete and inconsistent. Since scoring was much lower in this era, and teams played much fewer games during a typical season, it is likely that few or no players from this era would appear on these lists anyway.

The NCAA did not officially record assists as a stat until the 1983–84 season, and blocks and steals until the 1985–86 season, but Texas's record books includes players in these stats before these seasons. These lists are updated through the end of the 2020–21 season.

== Scoring ==
Career
Rk	Player	Points	Seasons
1	Terrence Rencher	2,306	1991–92 1992–93 1993–94 1994–95
2	Travis Mays	2,279	1986–87 1987–88 1988–89 1989–90
3	A.J. Abrams	1,969	2005–06 2006–07 2007–08 2008–09
4	Reggie Freeman	1,958	1993–94 1994–95 1995–96 1996–97
5	Damion James	1,917	2006–07 2007–08 2008–09 2009–10
6	Ron Baxter	1,897	1976–77 1977–78 1978–79 1979–80
7	Joey Wright	1,819	1988–89 1989–90 1990–91
8	Jim Krivacs	1,673	1976–77 1977–78 1978–79
9	Andrew Jones	1,622	2016–17 2017–18 2018–19 2019–20 2020–21 2021–22
10	Kris Clack	1,592	1995–96 1996–97 1997–98 1998–99

Season
Rk	Player	Points	Season
1	Kevin Durant	903	2006–07
2	Travis Mays	772	1989–90
3	Travis Mays	743	1988–89
4	D. J. Augustin	731	2007–08
5	Reggie Freeman	695	1995–96
6	J'Covan Brown	683	2011–12
7	Jim Krivacs	681	1977–78
8	Jordan Hamilton	671	2010–11
	Lance Blanks	671	1988–89
10	Tre Johnson	658	2024–25

Single game
Rk	Player	Points	Season	Opponent
1	Raymond Downs	49	1955–56	Baylor
	Slater Martin	49	1948–49	TCU
3	Joey Wright	46	1989–90	Stetson
4	Travis Mays	44	1989–90	Georgia
5	Reggie Freeman	43	1996–97	Fresno State
	Jim Krivacs	43	1978–79	Northern Montana
7	Jim Krivacs	42	1977–78	Oklahoma State
	Jordan Pope	42	2024–25	New Orleans
9	Marcus Carr	41	2022–23	A&M Commerce
	Tyrone Branyan	41	1978–79	Baylor
	Gary Overbeck	41	1967–68	Texas A&M
	Raymond Downs	41	1954–55	Arkansas

== Rebounds ==
Career
Rk	Player	Rebounds	Seasons
1	Damion James	1,318	2006–07 2007–08 2008–09 2009–10
2	James Thomas	1,077	2000–01 2001–02 2002–03 2003–04
3	LaSalle Thompson	1,027	1979–80 1980–81 1981–82
4	Chris Mihm	945	1997–98 1998–99 1999–00
5	Ron Baxter	916	1976–77 1977–78 1978–79 1979–80
6	Albert Burditt	897	1990–91 1991–92 1992–93 1993–94
7	Brad Buckman	808	2002–03 2003–04 2004–05 2005–06
8	Kris Clack	771	1995–96 1996–97 1997–98 1998–99
9	Jonathan Holmes	749	2011–12 2012–13 2013–14 2014–15
10	Cameron Ridley	720	2012–13 2013–14 2014–15 2015–16

Season
Rk	Player	Rebounds	Season
1	Damion James	393	2007–08
2	Kevin Durant	390	2006–07
3	LaSalle Thompson	370	1980–81
4	LaSalle Thompson	365	1981–82
5	James Thomas	363	2002–03
6	P. J. Tucker	353	2005–06
7	Chris Mihm	351	1998–99
8	Damion James	350	2009–10
9	Chris Mihm	346	1999–00
10	LaMarcus Aldridge	339	2005–06

Single game
Rk	Player	Rebounds	Season	Opponent
1	Lynn Howden	24	1970–71	Florida State
2	Kevin Durant	23	2006–07	Texas Tech
	Larry Robinson	23	1971–72	Centenary
4	Larry Robinson	22	1973–74	Memphis State
5	Brad Buckman	21	2004–05	Colorado
	LaSalle Thompson	21	1981–82	SMU
	LaSalle Thompson	21	1981–82	Xavier
	LaSalle Thompson	21	1980–81	North Texas
	Ellis Olmstead	21	1955–56	Auburn

== Assists ==
Career
Rk	Player	Assists	Seasons
1	Johnny Moore	714	1975–76 1976–77 1977–78 1978–79
2	T. J. Ford	527	2001–02 2002–03
3	B. J. Tyler	480	1991–92 1992–93 1993–94
4	Matt Coleman III	477	2017–18 2018–19 2019–20 2020–21
5	Alex Broadway	457	1984–85 1985–86 1986–87 1987–88
6	D. J. Augustin	452	2006–07 2007–08
7	Terrence Rencher	440	1991–92 1992–93 1993–94 1994–95
8	Isaiah Taylor	415	2013–14 2014–15 2015–16
9	Justin Mason	378	2006–07 2007–08 2008–09 2009–10
	Dan Krueger	378	1972–73 1973–74 1974–75 1975–76

Season
Rk	Player	Assists	Season
1	T. J. Ford	273	2001–02
2	T. J. Ford	254	2002–03
3	Johnny Moore	242	1978–79
4	D. J. Augustin	233	2006–07
5	B. J. Tyler	229	1991–92
6	D. J. Augustin	219	2007–08
7	Johnny Moore	214	1977–78
8	Roderick Anderson	211	1994–95
9	B. J. Tyler	175	1993–94
10	Isaiah Taylor	164	2015–16

Single game
Rk	Player	Assists	Season	Opponent
1	Johnny Moore	19	1978–79	Oklahoma State
	Johnny Moore	19	1978–79	Northern Montana
3	B. J. Tyler	18	1992–93	Oral Roberts
4	Johnny Moore	17	1976–77	TCU
5	Johnny Moore	16	1977–78	Texas A&M
6	B. J. Tyler	15	1991–92	Rice
7	T. J. Ford	14	2001–02	Arizona
	B. J. Tyler	14	1991–92	Washington
	Johnny Moore	14	1978–79	Texas A&M
	Johnny Moore	14	1978–79	Baylor

== Steals ==
Career
Rk	Player	Steals	Seasons
1	Terrence Rencher	255	1991–92 1992–93 1993–94 1994–95
2	Kris Clack	239	1995–96 1996–97 1997–98 1998–99
3	B.J. Tyler	202	1991–92 1992–93 1993–94
4	Lance Blanks	198	1988–89 1989–90
5	Reggie Freeman	193	1993–94 1994–95 1995–96 1996–97
6	A.J. Abrams	179	2005–06 2006–07 2007–08 2008–09
7	Albert Burditt	170	1990–91 1991–92 1992–93 1993–94
8	Roderick Anderson	165	1993–94 1994–95
	Joey Wright	165	1988–89 1989–90 1990–91
10	Kerwin Roach	163	2015–16 2016–17 2017–18 2018–19

Season
Rk	Player	Steals	Season
1	Lance Blanks	111	1988–89
2	Roderick Anderson	101	1994–95
3	B. J. Tyler	87	1993–94
	Lance Blanks	87	1989–90
5	B. J. Tyler	82	1991–92
6	Kris Clack	79	1996–97
	Terrence Rencher	79	1993–94
8	Albert Burditt	73	1993–94
9	T. J. Ford	72	2001–02
10	Reggie Freeman	70	1995–96

Single game
Rk	Player	Steals	Season	Opponent
1	Ivan Wagner	10	1998–99	Texas A&M
	B.J. Tyler	10	1993–94	Houston
3	Johnny Moore	9	1976–77	Rhode Island
4	Albert Burditt	8	1991–92	Texas Tech
	Lance Blanks	8	1989–90	VMI
	Johnny Moore	8	1977–78	Houston

== Blocks ==
Career
Rk	Player	Blocks	Seasons
1	Chris Mihm	264	1997–98 1998–99 1999–00
2	Albert Burditt	236	1990–91 1991–92 1992–93 1993–94
3	Cameron Ridley	220	2012–13 2013–14 2014–15 2015–16
4	Prince Ibeh	212	2012–13 2013–14 2014–15 2015–16
5	Connor Atchley	189	2005–06 2006–07 2007–08 2008–09
6	Brad Buckman	168	2002–03 2003–04 2004–05 2005–06
7	Damion James	163	2006–07 2007–08 2008–09 2009–10
8	Chris Owens	159	1999–00 2000–01 2001–02
9	LaSalle Thompson	145	1979–80 1980–81 1981–82
10	Dexter Pittman	124	2006–07 2007–08 2008–09 2009–10

Season
Rk	Player	Blocks	Season
1	Mohamed Bamba	111	2017–18
2	Chris Owens	92	2000–01
3	Chris Mihm	90	1999–00
	Chris Mihm	90	1997–98
5	Myles Turner	89	2014–15
6	Tristan Thompson	86	2010–11
7	Chris Mihm	84	1998–99
8	Connor Atchley	80	2007–08
9	Cameron Ridley	76	2013–14
10	Albert Burditt	74	1991–92

Single game
Rk	Player	Blocks	Season	Opponent
1	Cameron Ridley	9	2015–16	Appalachian State
2	Mohamed Bamba	8	2017–18	Kansas
	Chris Owens	8	2000–01	California
	Chris Mihm	8	1999–00	Massachusetts
5	Mohamed Bamba	7	2017–18	Texas Tech
	Prince Ibeh	7	2015–16	Kansas
	Cameron Ridley	7	2015–16	Washington
	Tristan Thompson	7	2010–11	Oakland
	Dexter Pittman	7	2009–10	USC
	Jason Klotz	7	2004–05	UTSA
	Brad Buckman	7	2004–05	North Texas
	Chris Mihm	7	1999–00	Houston
	Chris Mihm	7	1998–99	Houston
	Chris Mihm	7	1997–98	Oklahoma State
	Chris Mihm	7	1997–98	North Texas
	Albert Burditt	7	1993–94	Houston
	Albert Burditt	7	1992–93	Baylor
