= List of Texas Longhorns in the NBA draft =

This is a list of Texas Longhorns men's basketball players selected in the NBA draft.

== Key ==
*	= Selected to the Naismith Memorial Basketball Hall of Fame
†	= NBA All-Star Game participant
‡	= NBA Champion
**Bold**	= Selected to the College Basketball Hall of Fame

^ = Currently active in the NBA
# = Currently active in the NBA G League

=== Position key ===
Guard	**G**	Point guard	**PG**	Shooting guard	**SG**	Forward	**F**	Small forward	**SF**	Power forward	**PF**	Center	**C**

== Draft selections ==
Here’s the list of players that were drafted in the NBA draft.

Year	Round	Pick	Name	Team	Position	Source
1957	6	44	Raymond Downs	St. Louis Hawks	F	
1960	2	9	Jay Arnette	Cincinnati Royals	G	
1961	7	63	Albert Alamanza	Los Angeles Lakers	F	
1965	14	103	Larry Franks	Cincinnati Royals	F	
1973	8	132	J.G. Brosterhos	Chicago Bulls	F	
1974	4	59	Larry Robinson	Houston Rockets	PF	
1976	8	132	Dan Kruger	Houston Rockets	G	
1978	5	91	Gary Goodner	Houston Rockets	F	
1978	6	114	Jim Krivacs	Kansas City Kings	PG	
1979	2	43	Johnny Moore	Seattle SuperSonics	G	
1979	7	146	Tyrone Branyan	San Antonio Spurs	F	
1980	4	91	Ron Baxter	Los Angeles Lakers	SG	
1982	1	5	LaSalle Thompson	Kansas City Kings	C	
1984	8	171	Bill Wendlandt	Denver Nuggets	F	
1985	6	132	Carlton Cooper	Dallas Mavericks	F	
1985	7	151	Mike Wacker	Utah Jazz	F	
1986	4	78	John Brownlee	Los Angeles Clippers	PF	
1987	5	106	Patrick Fairs	Washington Wizards	G	
1987	7	142	Raynard Davis	San Antonio Spurs	C	
1990	1	14	Travis Mays	Sacramento Kings	PG	
1990	1	26	Lance Blanks	Detroit Pistons	SG	
1991	2	50	Joey Wright	Phoenix Suns	G	
1994	1	20	B. J. Tyler	Philadelphia 76ers	G	
1994	2	53	Albert Burditt	Houston Rockets	PF	
1995	2	32	Terrence Rencher	Washington Wizards	G	
1999	2	55	Kris Clack	Boston Celtics	G	
2000	1	7	Chris Mihm	Chicago Bulls	C	
2002	2	48	Chris Owens	Milwaukee Bucks	SF	
2003	1	8	T. J. Ford	Milwaukee Bucks	PG	
2004	2	37	Royal Ivey	Atlanta Hawks	G	
2006	1	2	LaMarcus Aldridge†	Chicago Bulls	F/C	
2006	2	35	P. J. Tucker‡	Toronto Raptors	SF	
2006	2	42	Daniel Gibson	Cleveland Cavaliers	G	
2007	1	2	Kevin Durant†‡^	Seattle SuperSonics	SF	
2008	1	9	D. J. Augustin	Charlotte Hornets	G	
2010	1	19	Avery Bradley‡	Boston Celtics	PG	
2010	1	24	Damion James‡	Atlanta Hawks	SF	
2010	2	32	Dexter Pittman‡	Miami Heat	C	
2011	1	4	Tristan Thompson‡	Cleveland Cavaliers	F	
2011	1	26	Jordan Hamilton	Dallas Mavericks	SF	
2011	1	29	Cory Joseph‡	San Antonio Spurs	PG	
2015	1	11	Myles Turner^	Indiana Pacers	F/C	
2017	1	22	Jarrett Allen†^	Brooklyn Nets	C	
2018	1	6	Mo Bamba	Orlando Magic	C	
2019	1	8	Jaxson Hayes^	Atlanta Hawks	PF	
2021	1	19	Kai Jones	New York Knicks	PF	
2021	2	43	Greg Brown#	New Orleans Pelicans	SF	
2021	2	58	Jericho Sims^	New York Knicks	C	
2025	1	6	Tre Johnson^	Washington Wizards	G	
2026	1	15	Dailyn Swain^	Chicago Bulls	G/SF	

== Draft selections by team ==
NBA Team	No. of Selections	Earliest Selection	Latest Selection
Atlanta Hawks	4	Raymond Downs (1957)	Jaxson Hayes (2019)
Boston Celtics	2	Kris Clack (1999)	Avery Bradley (2010)
Brooklyn Nets	1	Jarrett Allen (2017)	Jarrett Allen (2017)
Charlotte Hornets	1	D. J. Augustin (2008)	D. J. Augustin (2008)
Chicago Bulls	4	J.G. Brosterhos (1973)	Dailyn Swain (2026)
Cleveland Cavaliers	2	Daniel Gibson (2006)	Tristan Thompson (2011)
Dallas Mavericks	2	Carlton Cooper (1985)	Jordan Hamilton (2011)
Denver Nuggets	1	Bill Wendlandt (1984)	Bill Wendlandt (1984)
Detroit Pistons	1	Lance Blanks (1990)	Lance Blanks (1990)
Golden State Warriors	0	—	—
Houston Rockets	4	Larry Robinson (1974)	Albert Burditt (1994)
Indiana Pacers	1	Myles Turner (2015)	Myles Turner (2015)
Los Angeles Clippers	1	John Brownlee (1986)	John Brownlee (1986)
Los Angeles Lakers	3	Albert Alamanza (1961)	Ron Baxter (1980)
Memphis Grizzlies	0	—	—
Miami Heat	1	Dexter Pittman (2010)	Dexter Pittman (2010)
Milwaukee Bucks	2	Chris Owens (2002)	T. J. Ford (2003)
Minnesota Timberwolves	0	—	—
New Orleans Pelicans	1	Greg Brown (2021)	Greg Brown (2021)
New York Knicks	2	Kai Jones (2021)	Jericho Sims (2021)
Oklahoma City Thunder	2	Johnny Moore (1979)	Kevin Durant (2007)
Orlando Magic	1	Mo Bamba (2018)	Mo Bamba (2018)
Philadelphia 76ers	1	B. J. Tyler (1994)	B. J. Tyler (1994)
Phoenix Suns	1	Joey Wright (1991)	Joey Wright (1991)
Portland Trail Blazers	0	—	—
Sacramento Kings	5	Jay Arnette (1960)	Travis Mays (1990)
San Antonio Spurs	3	Tyrone Branyan (1979)	Cory Joseph (2011)
Toronto Raptors	1	P.J. Tucker (2006)	P.J. Tucker (2006)
Utah Jazz	1	Mike Wacker (1985)	Mike Wacker (1985)
Washington Wizards	3	Patrick Fairs (1987)	Tre Johnson (2025)

== Awards, honors, and achievements from draft selections ==
=== NBA Champions and postseason ===
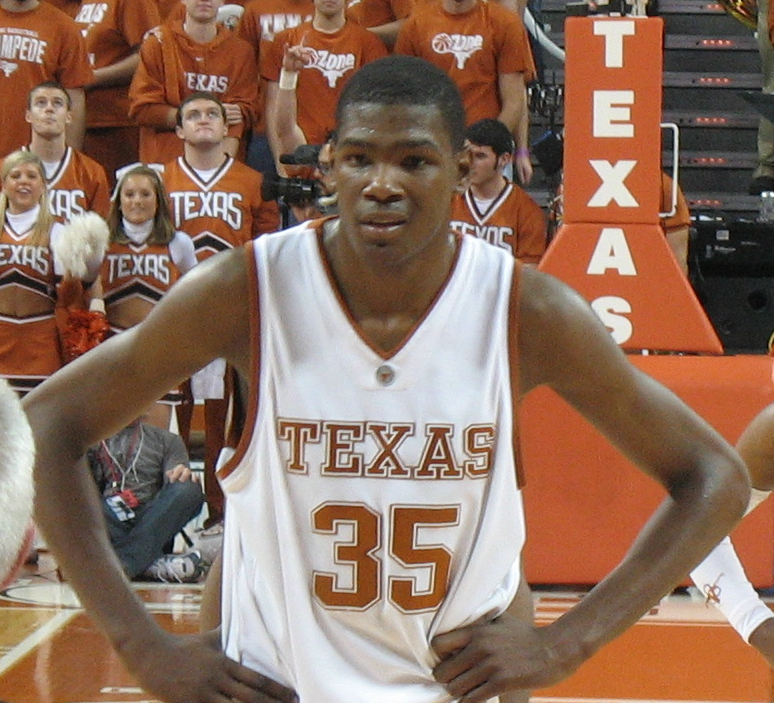
1st round draft pick Kevin Durant at Texas.

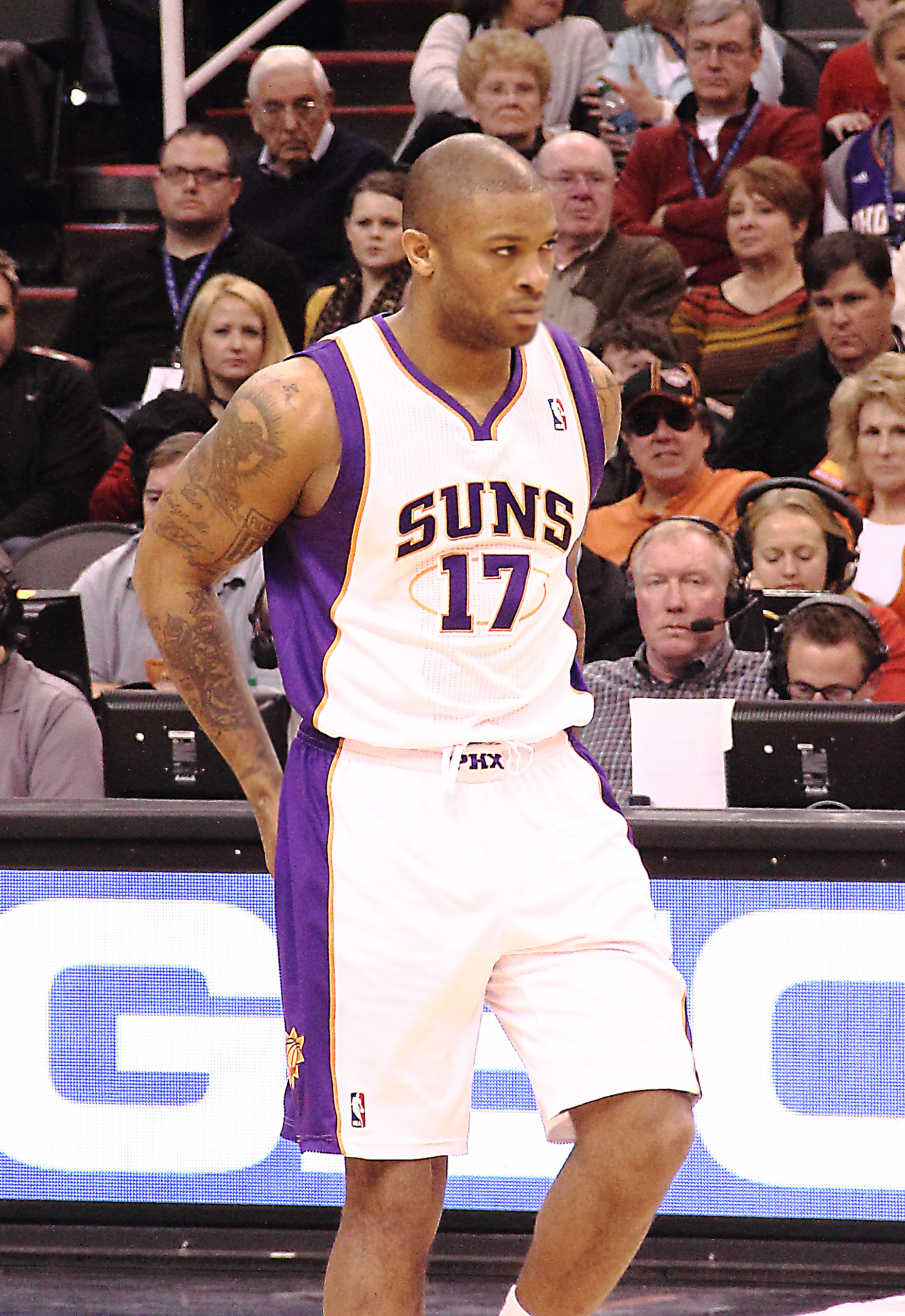
2006 2nd round draft pick P.J. Tucker.

**NBA Champions**
Player	Position	No. of titles	Source
Kevin Durant	SF	2	
P.J. Tucker	SF	1	
Avery Bradley	SG	1	
Damion James	SF	1	
Dexter Pittman	C	1	
Tristan Thompson	F/C	1	
Cory Joseph	PG	1	

**NBA Finals MVP**
Player	Position	No. of titles	Source
Kevin Durant	SF	2	

=== NBA All-Star selections ===
**NBA All-Star Selections**
Player	Position	No. of selections	Source
Kevin Durant	SF	15	
LaMarcus Aldridge	C/PF	7	
Jarrett Allen	C	1	

**NBA All-Star Game MVP**
Player	Position	No. of selections	Source
Kevin Durant	SF	2	

=== NBA regular season awards ===
**NBA Most Valuable Player**
Player	Position	No. of titles	Source
Kevin Durant	SF	1	

**All-NBA First Team**
Player	Position	No. of titles	Source
Kevin Durant	SF	6	

**All-NBA Second Team**
Player	Position	No. of titles	Source
Kevin Durant	SF	5	
LaMarcus Aldridge	C/PF	2	

**All-NBA Third Team**
Player	Position	No. of titles	Source
LaMarcus Aldridge	C/PF	3	

**NBA All-Defensive First Team**
Player	Position	No. of titles	Source
Avery Bradley	SG	1	

**NBA All-Defensive Second Team**
Player	Position	No. of titles	Source
Avery Bradley	SG	1	

**NBA Rookie of the Year**
Player	Position	No. of titles	Source
Kevin Durant	SF	1	

**NBA All-Rookie First Team**
Player	Position	No. of titles	Source
LaMarcus Aldridge	C/PF	1	
Kevin Durant	SF	1	

**NBA All-Rookie Second Team**
Player	Position	No. of titles	Source
Travis Mays	SG	1	
Chris Mihm	C	1	
T. J. Ford	PG	1	
D. J. Augustin	PG	1	
Tristan Thompson	F/C	1	
Myles Turner	C	1	

=== NBA regular season stat leaders ===
Stat	Player	Position	No. of years	Source
NBA Scoring Champion	Kevin Durant	SF	4	
NBA Assists leader	Johnny Moore	PG	1	
NBA Blocks leader	Myles Turner	C	2	

=== Retired and honored numbers ===
Player	Number	Team	Source
Johnny Moore	00	San Antonio Spurs	

=== NBA 75th Anniversary Team ===
Player	Position	Source
Kevin Durant	SF	
