= List of Texas Longhorns in the NBA =

This is a list of Texas Longhorns men's basketball players who played at least one game in the National Basketball Association (NBA).

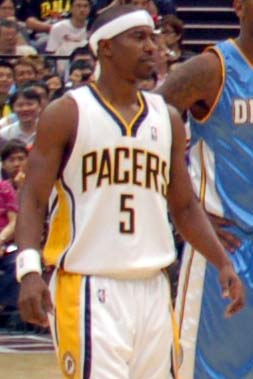
T. J. Ford in 2009

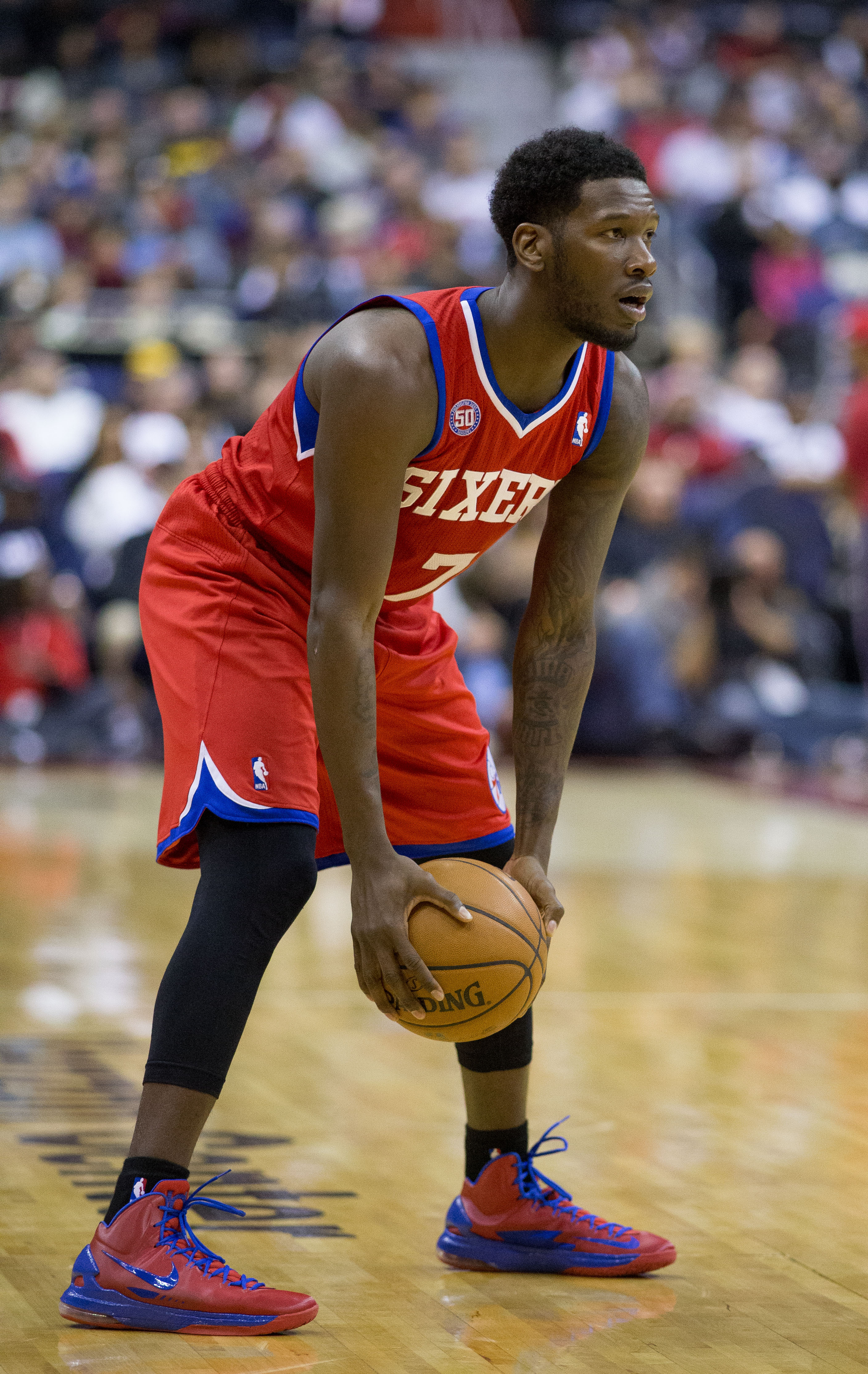
Royal Ivey in 2009

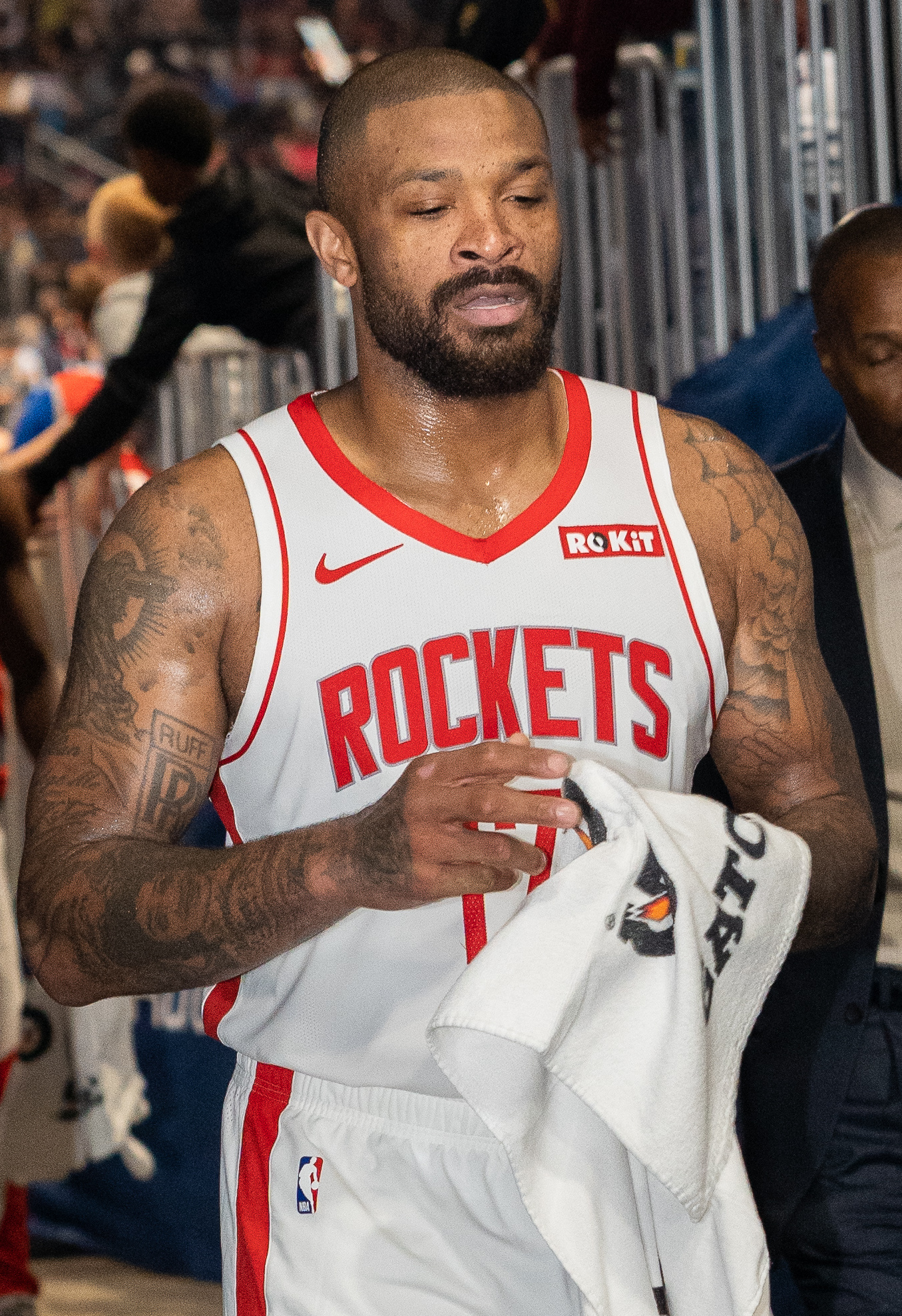
P. J. Tucker in 2019

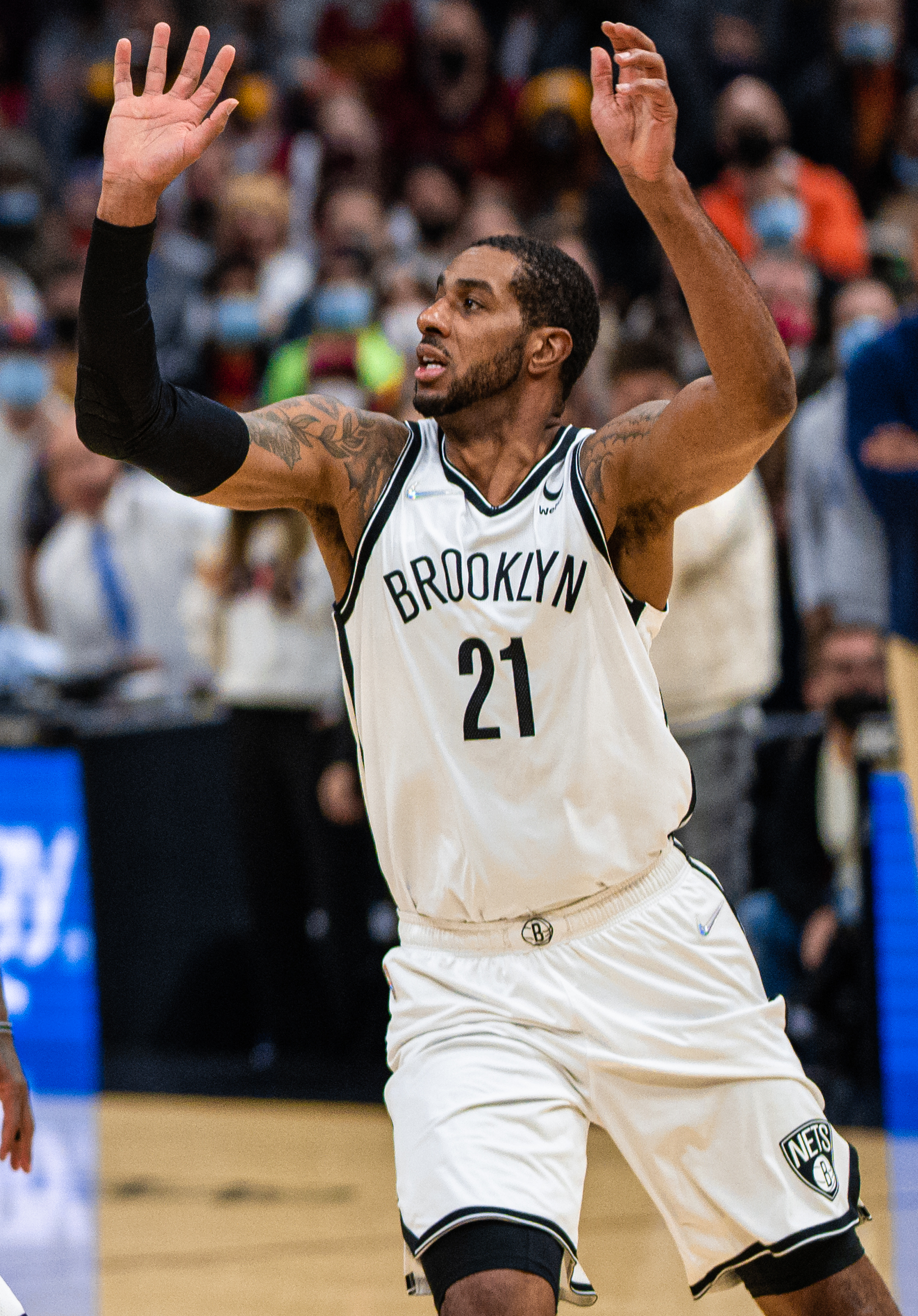
LaMarcus Aldridge in 2022

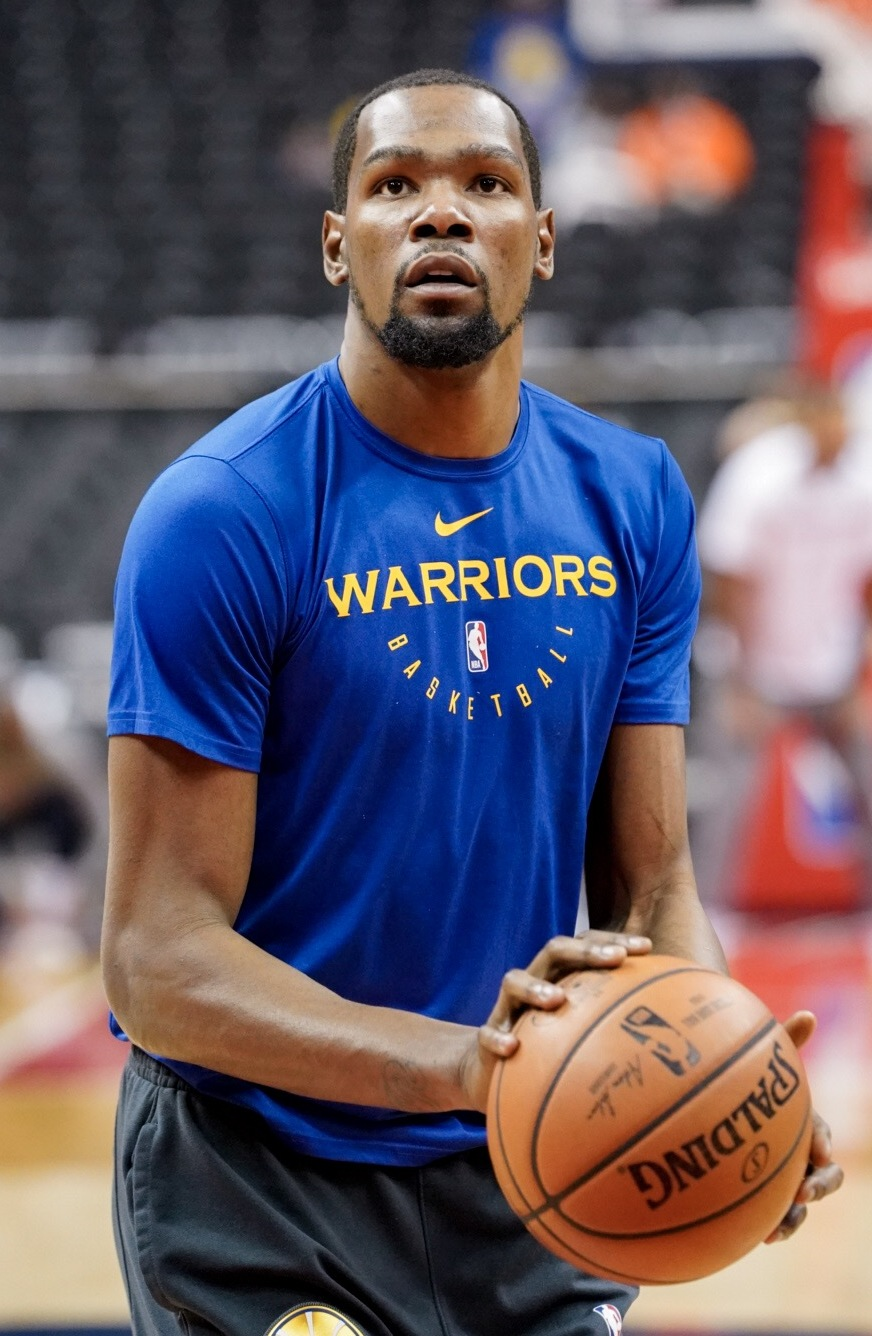
Kevin Durant in 2019

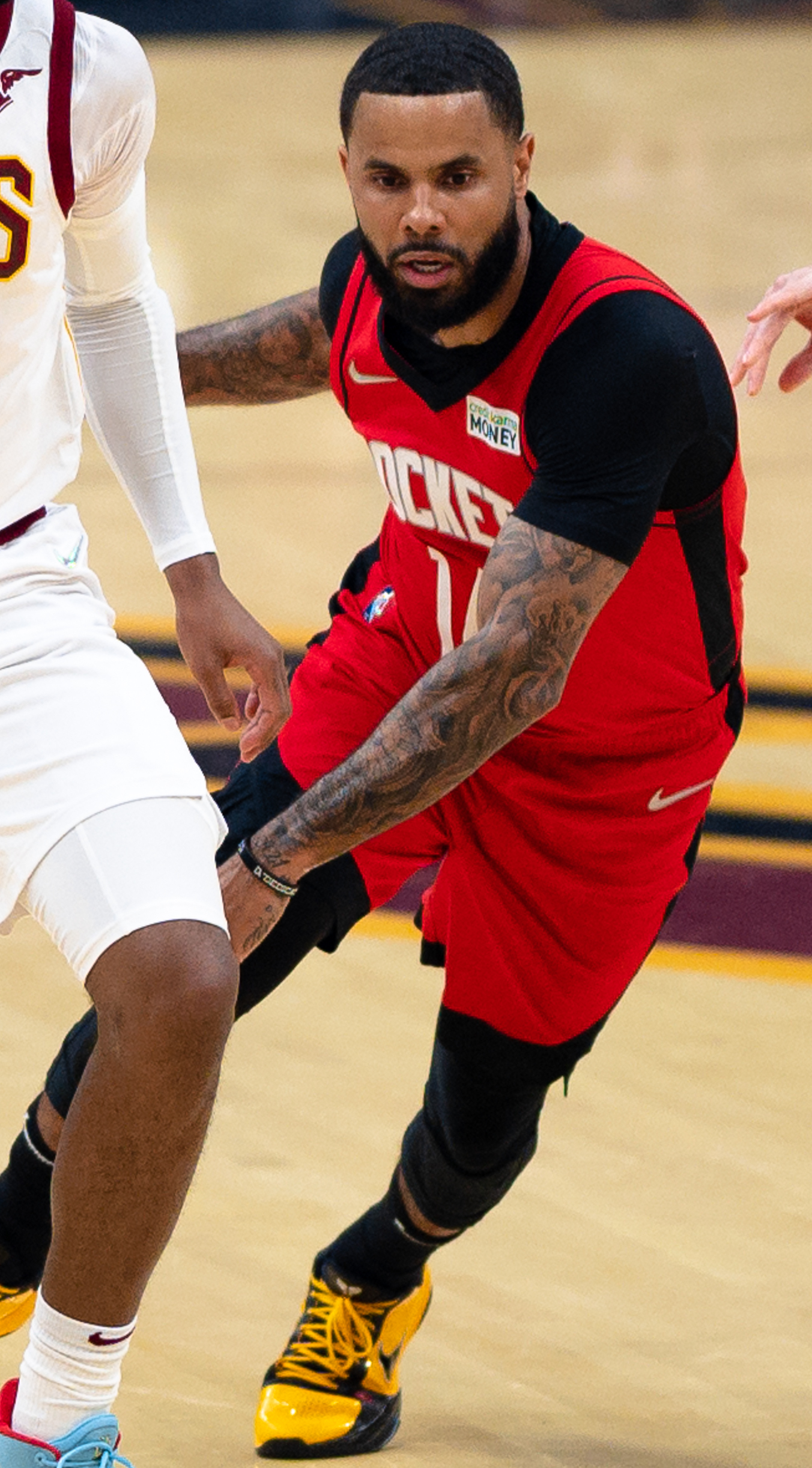
D. J. Augustin in 2021

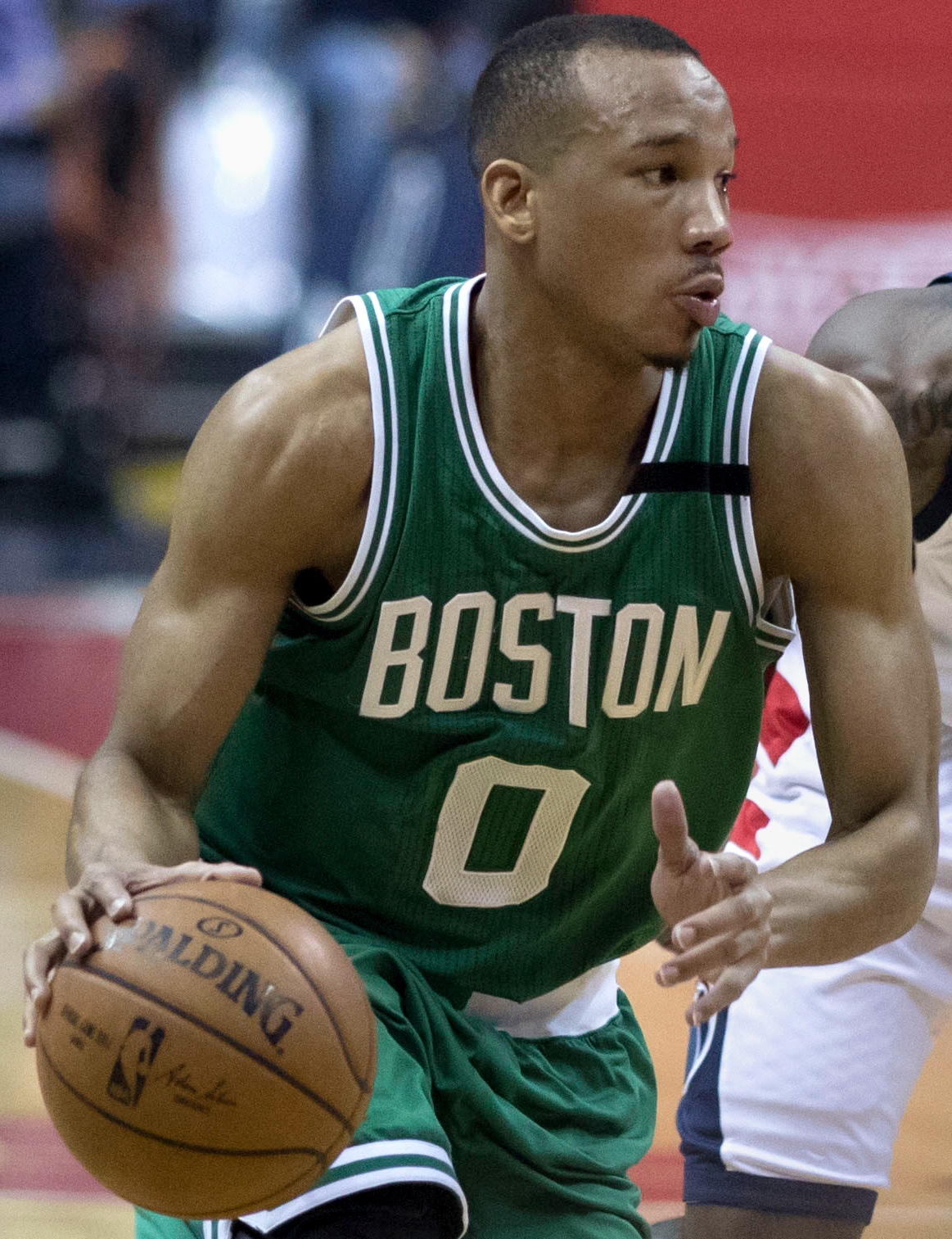
Avery Bradley in 2017

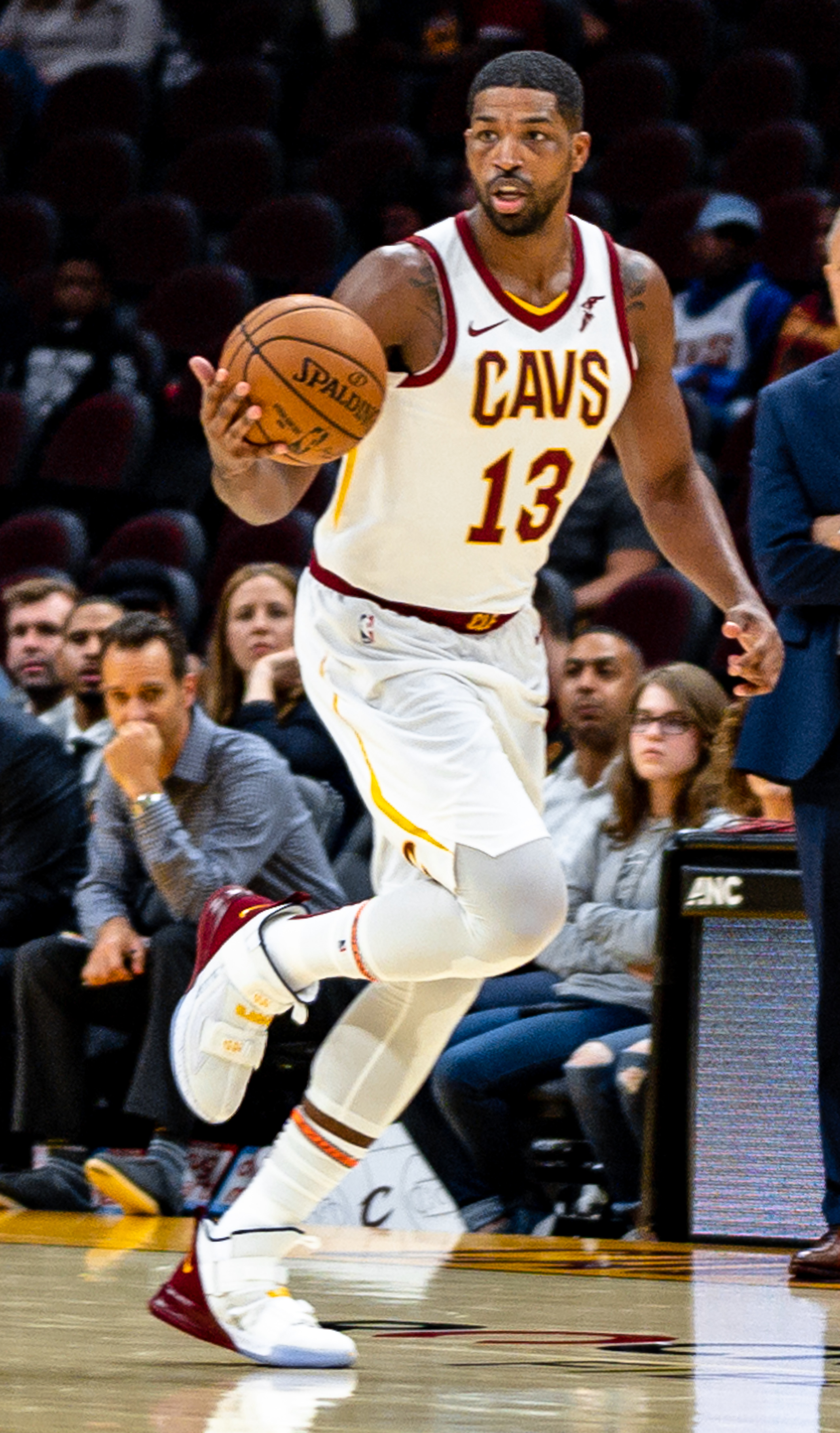
Tristan Thompson in 2019

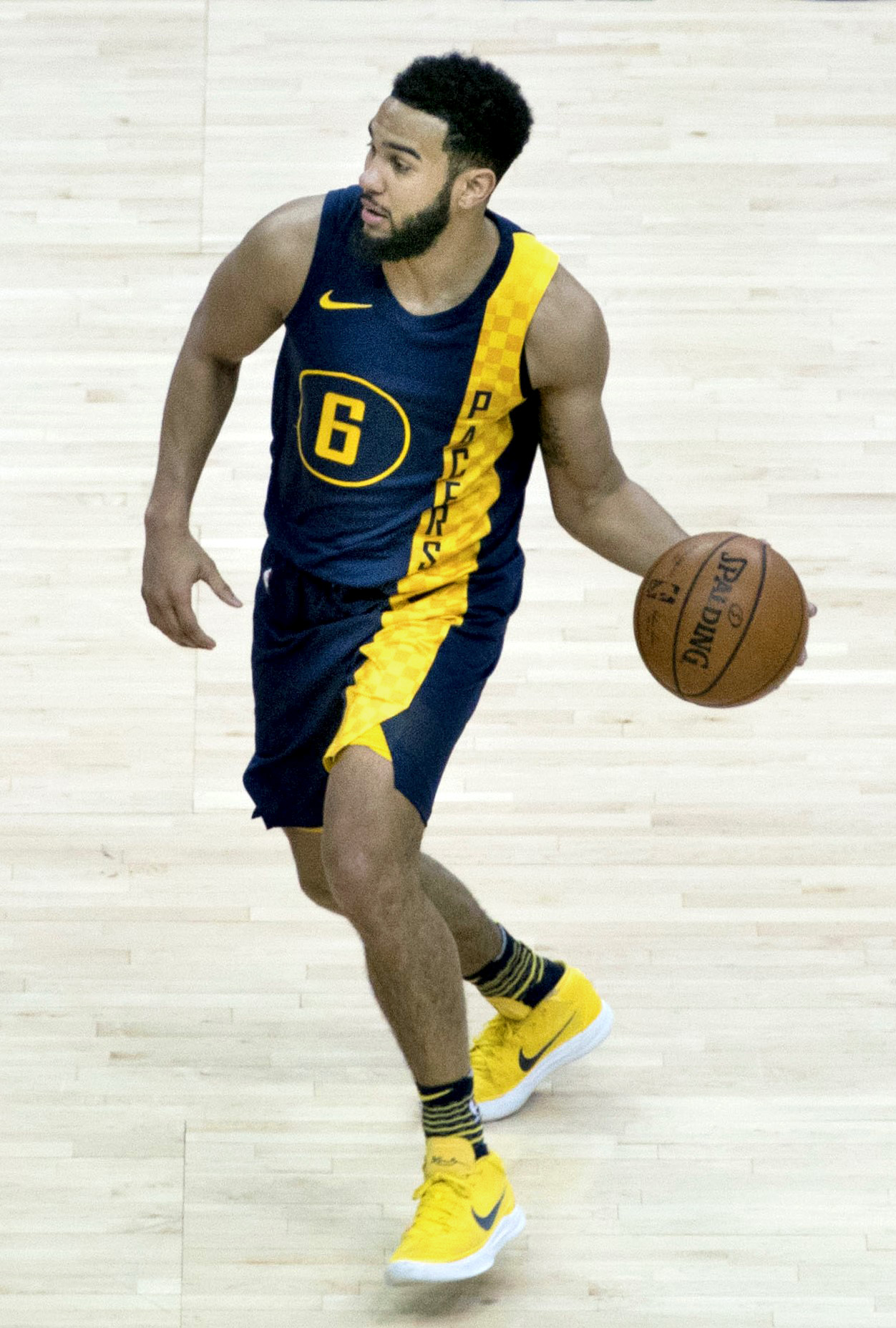
Cory Joseph in 2018

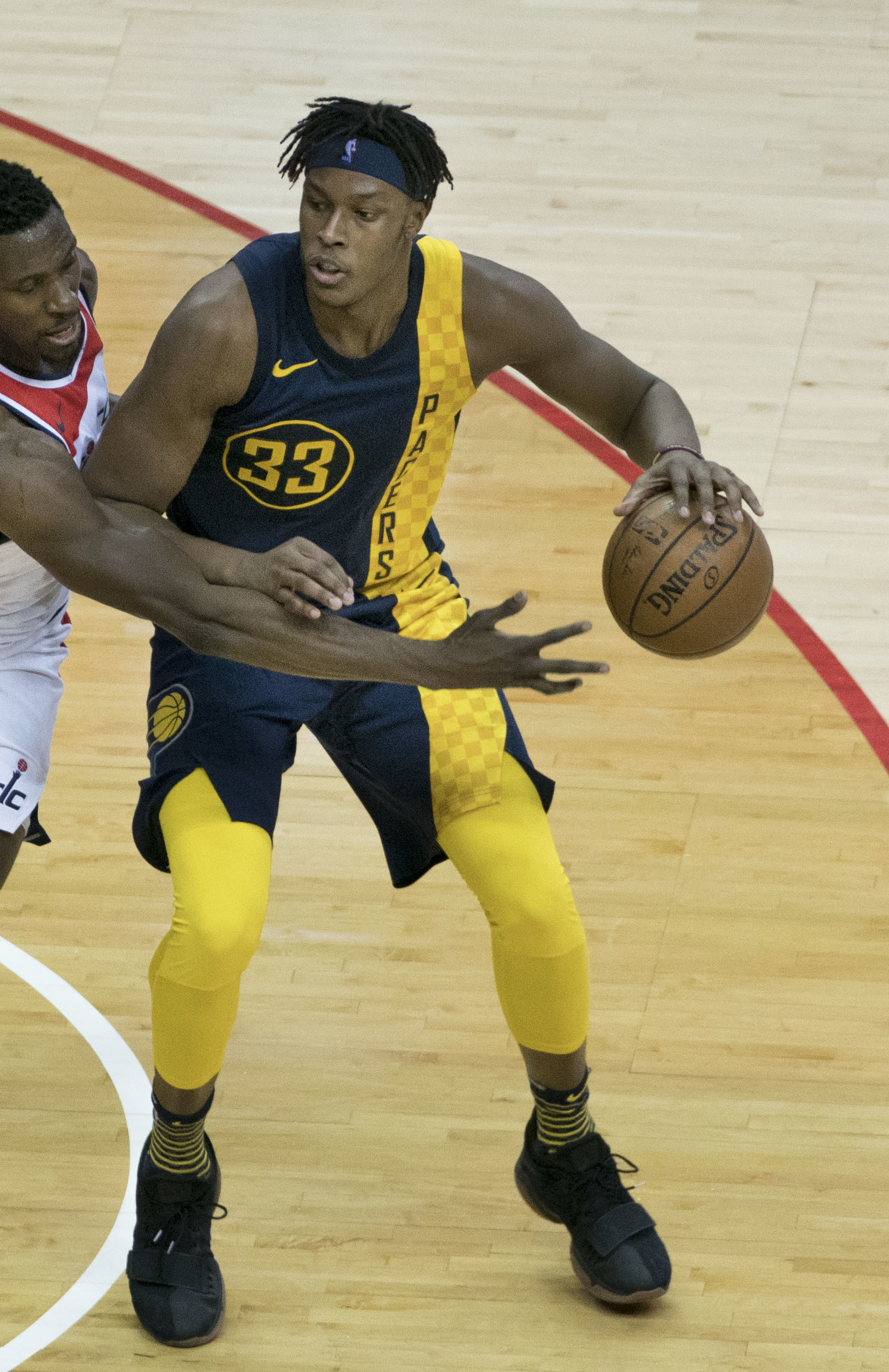
Myles Turner in 2018

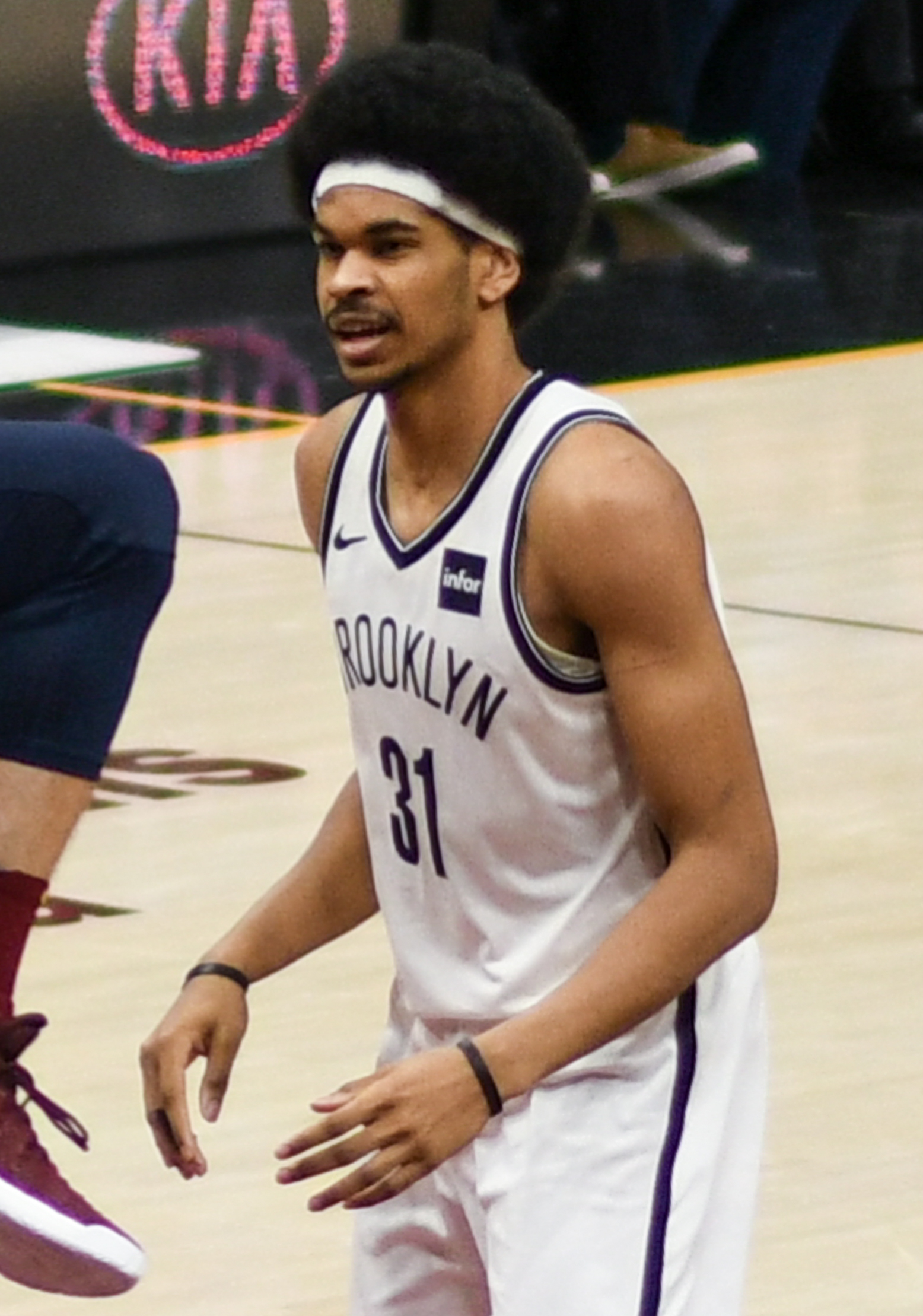
Jarrett Allen in 2018

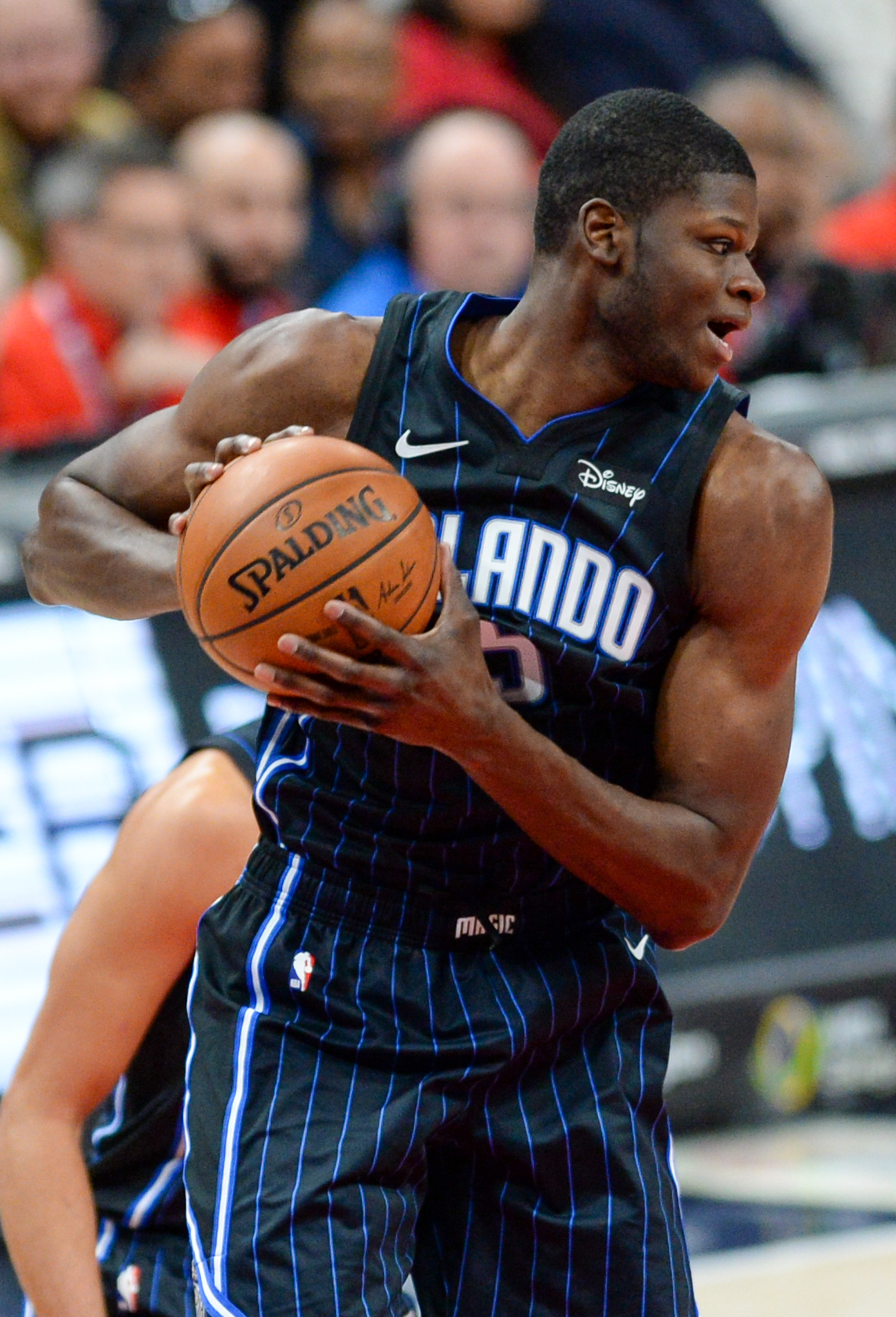
Mo Bamba in 2021

Number	Player	Draft year	Pick in draft	Started NBA career	Ended NBA career	Teams
1	John Hargis			1949	1951	Anderson Duffey Packers (NBL) (1947–1949); Anderson Packers (1949–1950); Fort Wayne Pistons (1950); Tri-Cities Blackhawks (1950–1951)
2	Danny Wagner			1949	1949	Flint Dow A.C.'s (NBL) (1947–1948); Sheboygan Red Skins (NBL) (1948–1949); Sheboygan Red Skins (1949)
3	Slater Martin			1949	1960	Minneapolis Lakers (1949–1956); New York Knicks (1956); St. Louis Hawks (1956–1960)
4	Jay Arnette	1960	9th overall pick	1963	1965	Cincinnati Royals (1963–1965)
5	Johnny Moore	1979	43rd overall pick	1980	1990	San Antonio Spurs (1980–1987); New Jersey Nets (1987); San Antonio Spurs (1989–1990)
6	LaSalle Thompson	1982	5th overall pick	1982	1997	Kansas City Kings (1982–1985); Sacramento Kings (1985–1989); Indiana Pacers (1989–1995); Philadelphia 76ers (1996); Denver Nuggets (1996–1997); Indiana Pacers (1997)
7	Alvin Heggs	1989	undrafted	1995	1995	Houston Rockets (1995)
8	Travis Mays	1990	14th overall pick	1990	1993	Sacramento Kings (1990–1991); Atlanta Hawks (1991–1993)
9	Lance Blanks	1990	26th overall pick	1990	1993	Detroit Pistons (1990–1992); Minnesota Timberwolves (1992–1993)
10	Dexter Cambridge	1992	undrafted	1993	1993	Dallas Mavericks (1993)
11	B. J. Tyler	1994	20th overall pick	1994	1995	Philadelphia 76ers (1994–1995)
12	Terrence Rencher	1995	32nd overall pick	1995	1996	Miami Heat (1995–1996); Phoenix Suns (1996)
13	Chris Mihm	2000	7th overall pick	2000	2009	Cleveland Cavaliers (2000–2003); Boston Celtics (2003–2004); Los Angeles Lakers (2004–2006, 2007–2009)
14	Maurice Evans	2001	undrafted	2001	2012	Minnesota Timberwolves (2001–2002); Sacramento Kings (2004–2005); Detroit Pistons (2005–2006); Los Angeles Lakers (2006–2007); Orlando Magic (2007–2008); Atlanta Hawks (2008–2011); Washington Wizards (2011–2012)
15	Chris Owens	2002	47th overall pick	2003	2003	Memphis Grizzlies (2002–2003)
16	T. J. Ford	2003	8th overall pick	2003	2012	Milwaukee Bucks (2003–2004, 2005–2006); Toronto Raptors (2006–2008); Indiana Pacers (2008–2011); San Antonio Spurs (2011–2012)
17	Royal Ivey	2004	37th overall pick	2004	2014	Atlanta Hawks (2004–2007); Milwaukee Bucks (2007–2008); Philadelphia 76ers (2008–2010); Milwaukee Bucks (2010); Oklahoma City Thunder (2010–2012); Philadelphia 76ers (2012–2013); Oklahoma City Thunder (2013–2014)
18	James Thomas	2004	undrafted	2005	2006	Portland Trail Blazers (2005); Atlanta Hawks (2005); Philadelphia 76ers (2005); Chicago Bulls (2006)
19	LaMarcus Aldridge	2006	2nd overall pick	2006	2022	Portland Trail Blazers (2006–2015); San Antonio Spurs (2015–2021); Brooklyn Nets (2021–2022)
20	P. J. Tucker	2006	35th overall pick	2006	2025	Toronto Raptors (2006–2007); Phoenix Suns (2012–2017); Toronto Raptors (2017); Houston Rockets (2017–2021); Milwaukee Bucks (2021); Miami Heat (2021–2022); Philadelphia 76ers (2022–2023); Los Angeles Clippers (2023–2024); New York Knicks (2025)
21	Daniel Gibson	2006	42nd overall pick	2006	2013	Cleveland Cavaliers (2006–2013)
22	Kevin Durant	2007	2nd overall pick	2007	present	Seattle SuperSonics (2007–2008); Oklahoma City Thunder (2008–2016); Golden State Warriors (2016–2019); Brooklyn Nets (2019–2023); Phoenix Suns (2023–2025); Houston Rockets (2025–present)
23	D. J. Augustin	2008	9th overall pick	2008	2022	Charlotte Bobcats (2008–2012); Indiana Pacers (2012–2013); Toronto Raptors (2013); Chicago Bulls (2013–2014); Detroit Pistons (2014–2015); Oklahoma City Thunder (2015–2016); Denver Nuggets (2016); Orlando Magic (2016–2020); Milwaukee Bucks (2020–2021); Houston Rockets (2021–2022); Los Angeles Lakers (2022)
24	Avery Bradley	2010	19th overall pick	2010	2022	Boston Celtics (2010–2017); Detroit Pistons (2017–2018); Los Angeles Clippers (2018–2019); Memphis Grizzlies (2019); Los Angeles Lakers (2019–2020); Miami Heat (2020–2021); Houston Rockets (2021); Los Angeles Lakers (2021–2022)
25	Damion James	2010	24th overall pick	2010	2014	New Jersey Nets (2010–2012); Brooklyn Nets (2012–2013); San Antonio Spurs (2014)
26	Dexter Pittman	2010	32nd overall pick	2010	2014	Miami Heat (2010–2013); Memphis Grizzlies (2013); Atlanta Hawks (2014)
27	Tristan Thompson	2011	4th overall pick	2011	2025	Cleveland Cavaliers (2011–2020); Boston Celtics (2020–2021); Sacramento Kings (2021–2022); Indiana Pacers (2022); Chicago Bulls (2022); Los Angeles Lakers (2023); Cleveland Cavaliers (2023–2025)
28	Jordan Hamilton	2011	26th overall pick	2011	2016	Denver Nuggets (2011–2014); Houston Rockets (2014); Los Angeles Clippers (2014–2015); New Orleans Pelicans (2016)
29	Cory Joseph	2011	29th overall pick	2011	2025	San Antonio Spurs (2011–2015); Toronto Raptors (2015–2017); Indiana Pacers (2017–2019); Sacramento Kings (2019–2021); Detroit Pistons (2021–2023); Golden State Warriors (2023–2024); Orlando Magic (2024–2025)
30	Myles Turner	2015	11th overall pick	2015	present	Indiana Pacers (2015–2025); Milwaukee Bucks (2025–present)
31	Sheldon McClellan	2016	undrafted	2016	2017	Washington Wizards (2016–2017)
32	Isaiah Taylor	2016	undrafted	2017	2018	Houston Rockets (2017); Atlanta Hawks (2017–2018)
33	Jarrett Allen	2017	22nd overall pick	2017	present	Brooklyn Nets (2017–2021); Cleveland Cavaliers (2021–present)
34	Mohamed Bamba	2018	6th overall pick	2018	present	Orlando Magic (2018–2023); Los Angeles Lakers (2023); Philadelphia 76ers (2023–2024); Los Angeles Clippers (2024–2025); New Orleans Pelicans (2025); Toronto Raptors (2025–2026); Utah Jazz (2026–present)
35	Jaxson Hayes	2019	8th overall pick	2019	present	New Orleans Pelicans (2019–2023); Los Angeles Lakers (2023–2026); Utah Jazz (2026–present)
36	Kai Jones	2021	19th overall pick	2021	2025	Charlotte Hornets (2021–2023); Los Angeles Clippers (2024–2025); Dallas Mavericks (2025)
37	Greg Brown III	2021	43rd overall pick	2021	2024	Portland Trail Blazers (2021–2023); Dallas Mavericks (2023–2024)
38	Jericho Sims	2021	58th overall pick	2021	present	New York Knicks (2021–2025); Milwaukee Bucks (2025–present)
39	Donovan Williams	2022	undrafted	2023	2023	Atlanta Hawks (2023)
40	Timmy Allen	2023	undrafted	2024	2024	Memphis Grizzlies (2024)
41	Jaylon Tyson	2024	20th overall pick	2024	present	Cleveland Cavaliers (2024–present)
42	Tre Johnson	2025	6th overall pick	2025	present	Washington Wizards (2025–present)
43	Jayson Kent	2025	undrafted	2026	present	Portland Trail Blazers (2026–present)
44	Dailyn Swain	2026	15th overall pick	2026	present	Chicago Bulls (2026–present)
