= Roderick Anderson =

American basketball player (born 1972)

Personal information
- Born: April 8, 1972 (age 54) Baton Rouge, Louisiana, U.S.
- Listed height: 5 ft 10 in (1.78 m)
- Listed weight: 165 lb (75 kg)

Career information
- High school: Robert E. Lee (Baton Rouge, Louisiana)
- College: Angelina (1991–1993); Texas (1993–1995)
- NBA draft: 1995: undrafted
- Playing career: 1995–2002
- Position: Point guard

Career history
- 1995–1996: Fort Wayne Fury
- 1996–1997: Portland Wave
- 1998–1999: Magic City Snowbears
- 1999–2000: 08 Stockholm Human Rights
- 2000–2001: BK Opava
- 2001–2002: Sloboda Dita
- 2002: Londrina

Career highlights
- ABA League steals leader (2002); NCAA steals leader (1995); First-team All-SWC (1995)

Roderick James Anderson (born April 8, 1972) is an American former professional basketball player. He attended Angelina College for two years before transferring to the NCAA Division I, spending two years at Texas. In 1994–95 he led the NCAA in steals, averaging 3.4 per game.

== College career ==
A Baton Rouge, Louisiana native, Anderson joined Angelina College in Lufkin, Texas in 1991. During his first season he averaged 29.3 points, 7 rebounds and 3.5 assists per game, and was named a first-team junior college All-American at the end of his freshman season. In his sophomore season with the Angelina Roadrunners, Anderson posted averages of 28.6 points, 9 rebounds and 8.3 assists per game, and again earned first-team All-American honors. He scored 47 points in 1993 against Navarro College, an all-time record for Angelina. He also holds the record for most free throws in a single game with 25. In 2015 Anderson was inducted in the Angelina Hall of Fame.

Anderson's performances at JUCO level earned him attention from three Division I programs: Arkansas, Cincinnati and Texas. In April 1993 he signed with Texas. In his first year with the Longhorns he started 13 games of 29 played, and ranked second on the team in assists per game (behind B. J. Tyler) and fourth in points per game with 12.3, playing a total of 824 minutes over 29 games (28.4 per game). In his senior season Anderson was named co-captain with Terrence Rencher and improved his averages to 7 assists and 20.3 points per game, ranking first on the team in assists and second in scoring (behind Rencher), playing a total of 1023 minutes (34.1 per game). On February 11, 1995, he tied a Texas record for most free throws in one half with 12 against Texas A&M. His 7 assists per game ranked him second in the SWC behind Nelson Haggerty of Baylor, and he led the nation in steals per game with 3.4 (101 total). At the end of the season he was a consensus First-team All-SWC selection, and he was named the team co-MVP together with Rencher.

He finished his career at Texas as the 9th player of all-time for assists with a total of 362, and 8th for total steals with 165.

=== College statistics ===
==== Junior college ====
Year	Team	GP	GS	MPG	FG%	3P%	FT%	RPG	APG	SPG	BPG	PPG
1991–92	Angelina	33			.430	–	.800	7.0	3.5	–	–	29.3
1992–93	Angelina	32			.450	–	.800	9.0	8.3	–	–	28.6
Career		65			.440	–	.800	8.0	5.9	–	–	29.0

==== Division I ====
*	Led NCAA Division I

Year	Team	GP	GS	MPG	FG%	3P%	FT%	RPG	APG	SPG	BPG	PPG
1993–94	Texas	29	13	28.4	.455	.324	.712	3.2	5.2	2.2	0.0	12.3
1994–95	Texas	30		34.1	.447	.371	.705	2.7	7.0	3.4*	0.0	20.3
Career		59		31.3	.450	.355	.707	2.9	6.1	2.8	0.0	16.3

== Professional career ==
After the end of his senior season at Texas, Anderson was automatically eligible for the 1995 NBA draft, but he was not selected by any franchise. He was drafted in the 2nd round (17th overall) of the 1995 CBA draft by the Quad City Thunder in September 1995. In October he participated in a preseason rookie camp for the Cleveland Cavaliers, but was cut on October 16, 1995. He then joined the Fort Wayne Fury for the 1995–96 CBA season, and he played only 3 games with the team, averaging 3.7 points, 2.7 assists and 0.3 steals in 12.3 minutes per game.

In 1996 he joined the Portland Wave of the United States Basketball League, being waived in May 1997. Later in 1997 Anderson tried out for the Galveston Storm of the Southwest Basketball League, but did not make the final roster. He then spent the 1998–99 season with the Magic City Snowbears of the International Basketball Association. In 1999 he moved to Sweden in Europe, and signed for the 08 Stockholm Human Rights, where he spent the 1999–2000 season. In 2000 he moved to the Czech Republic and signed for BK Opava, where he averaged 8.2 points, 5.2 rebounds and 2.9 assists in the 2000–01 National Basketball League season. Anderson spent the 2001–02 season with Sloboda Dita, and played 22 games in the ABA League, posting averages of 8.7 points, 3.2 rebounds, 1.2 assists and a league-leading 2.4 steals per game. In 2002 he briefly joined Londrina in Brazil before being waived.
