= Greg Brown III =

American basketball player (born 2001)

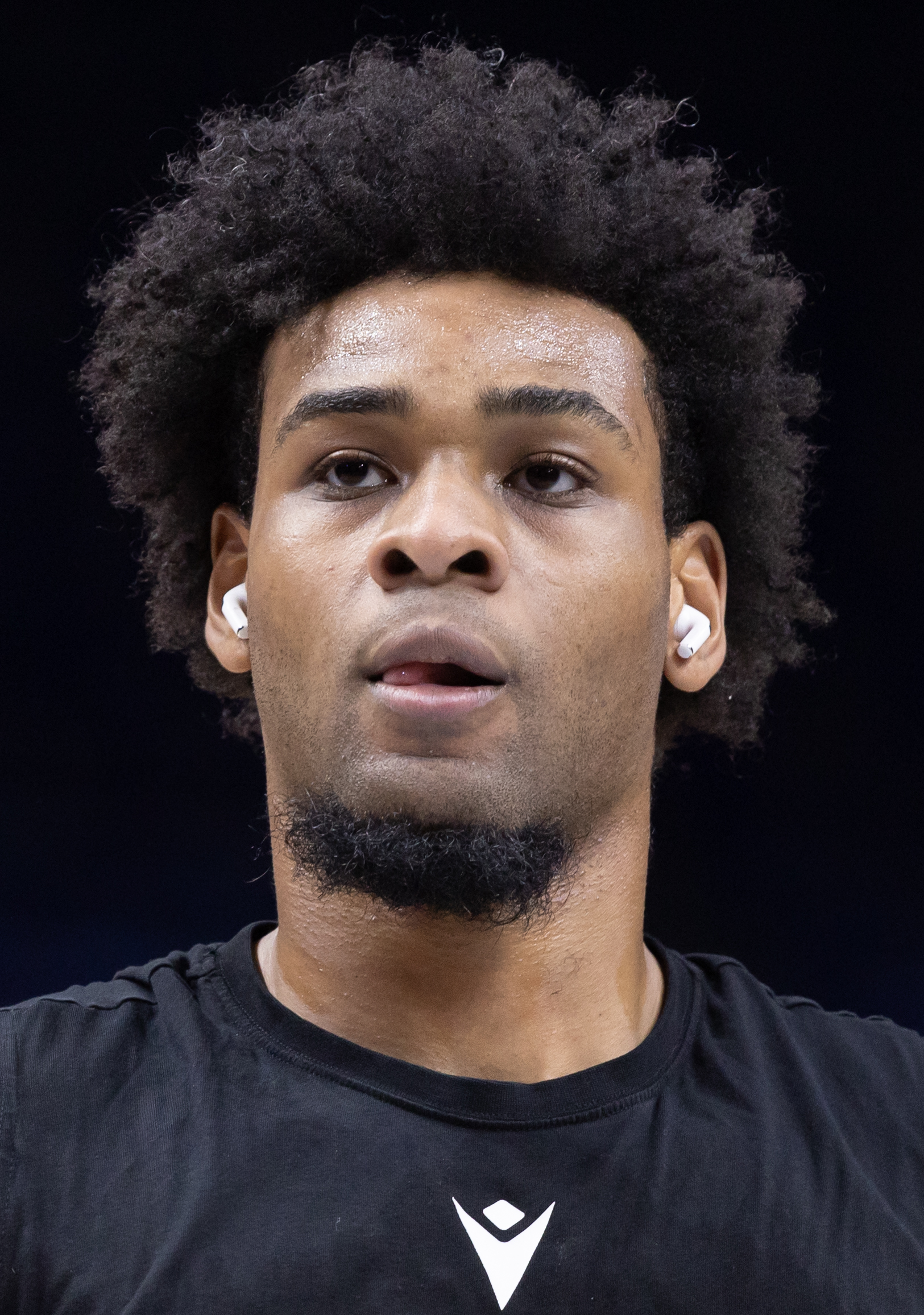
- Brown in 2026

No. 2 – AEK Athens
- Position: Power forward / center
- League: Greek Basketball League

Personal information
- Born: September 1, 2001 (age 24) Dallas, Texas, U.S.
- Listed height: 6 ft 8 in (2.03 m)
- Listed weight: 215 lb (98 kg)

Career information
- High school: Vandegrift (Austin, Texas)
- College: Texas (2020–2021)
- NBA draft: 2021: 2nd round, 43rd overall pick
- Drafted by: New Orleans Pelicans
- Playing career: 2021–present

Career history
- 2021–2023: Portland Trail Blazers
- 2022–2023: →Ontario Clippers
- 2023: Ontario Clippers
- 2023–2024: Dallas Mavericks
- 2023–2024: →Texas Legends
- 2024–2025: Mexico City Capitanes
- 2025: Calgary Surge
- 2025–present: AEK Athens

Career highlights
- Greek League Most Spectacular Player (2026); All-CEBL First Team (2025); Big 12 All-Newcomer Team (2021); Big 12 All-Freshman Team (2021); McDonald's All-American (2020); Texas Mr. Basketball (2020); Texas Gatorade Player of the Year (2020)
- Stats at NBA.com
- Stats at Basketball Reference

Gregory James Brown III (born September 1, 2001) is an American professional basketball player for AEK Athens of the Greek Basketball League. He played college basketball for the Texas Longhorns.

== Early life ==
Brown grew up playing basketball under the guidance of his uncle, Roderick Anderson, a former professional basketball player. Brown attended Vandegrift High School in Austin, Texas, where he was a four-year varsity basketball starter, in addition to competing in varsity track and field in the high jump. As a freshman, he recorded his first triple-double with 15 points, 14 rebounds and a school-record 18 blocks in a win over Hutto High School. In his freshman season, Brown averaged 17.2 points, 10.7 rebounds and 3.6 blocks per game, earning All-Central Texas Newcomer of the Year honors from the Austin American-Statesman.

As a sophomore, Brown averaged 27.4 points, 12.3 rebounds, and 2.5 blocks per game en route to District 25-6A offensive most valuable player (MVP) accolades. He led the district in scoring and rebounding. In his junior season, Brown averaged 30.1 points, 13.5 rebounds and 5.4 blocks per game. He missed 14 games early in the season with a dislocated finger. Brown was named to the All-Central Texas first team for his third straight year. As a senior, he averaged 26.1 points, 13.2 rebounds and 3.5 blocks per game, collecting District 13-6A MVP, Texas Gatorade Player of the Year and Austin American-Statesman All-Central Texas Player of the Year honors. Brown led Vandegrift to a program-best 33–3 record and its first district title. He was selected to play in the McDonald's All-American Game, which was canceled due to the COVID-19 pandemic.

Brown drew the attention of major college basketball programs before high school. In his freshman year, he emerged as one of the best players in the 2020 class and held basketball offers from several schools, including Kansas and Texas. By the end of his high school career, Brown was a consensus five-star recruit and a top-10 player in the 2020 class, according to major recruiting services. He trimmed his offers to Auburn, Kentucky, Memphis, Michigan or Texas, or opt to instead play professionally. On April 24, 2020, he announced his commitment to Texas over Auburn, Memphis, Michigan, Kentucky and a $300,000 offer from the G League.

College recruiting
Name	Hometown	School	Height	Weight	Commit date
Greg Brown; PF	Austin, TX	Vandegrift (TX)	6 ft 9 in (2.06 m)	206 lb (93 kg)	Apr 24, 2020
Greg Brown; PF	Recruit ratings: Rivals: 247Sports: ESPN: (95)				
Overall recruit ranking: Rivals: 10 247Sports: 11 ESPN: 9
Note: In many cases, Scout, Rivals, 247Sports, On3, and ESPN may conflict in their listings of height and weight.; In these cases, the average was taken. ESPN grades are on a 100-point scale.; Sources: "Texas 2020 Basketball Commitments". Rivals.; "2020 Texas Longhorns Recruiting Class". ESPN.; "2020 Team Ranking". Rivals.

== College career ==
In his college debut on November 25, 2020, Brown recorded 11 points and 10 rebounds in a 91–55 win against Texas–Rio Grande Valley. On December 20, he posted a career-high 24 points, 14 rebounds and three blocks in a 77–74 win over Oklahoma State. As a freshman, Brown averaged 9.3 points and 6.2 rebounds per game. He earned All-Big 12 honorable mention and was an All-Freshman Team and All-Newcomer Team selection. On May 13, 2021, Brown declared for the 2021 NBA draft, forgoing his remaining college eligibility.

== Professional career ==
=== Portland Trail Blazers (2021–2023) ===
Brown was selected in the second round of the 2021 NBA draft with the 43rd pick by the New Orleans Pelicans. He was then traded to the Portland Trail Blazers for a future second-round draft pick and cash considerations. Brown joined the Trail Blazers for the 2021 NBA Summer League. On August 12, 2021, he signed a 3-year, $4.3 million rookie scale contract with the Trail Blazers. On October 23, Brown made his NBA debut, logging four points and three rebounds in a 134–105 blowout win over the Phoenix Suns. On February 8, 2022, he scored a season-high 15 points, along with eight rebounds, in a 95–113 loss to the Orlando Magic. On March 23, in a 96–133 blowout loss to the San Antonio Spurs, Brown grabbed a season-high 14 rebounds, along with seven points and two blocks.

On February 9, 2023, Brown was waived by the Blazers.

=== San Diego Clippers (2023) ===
On March 2, 2023, Brown was acquired by the Ontario Clippers.

=== Dallas Mavericks (2023–2024) ===
On August 14, 2023, Brown signed with the Dallas Mavericks and on October 21, his deal was converted into a two-way contract. Brown reached the NBA Finals where the Mavericks lost to the Boston Celtics in five games.

=== Mexico City Capitanes (2024–2025) ===
On October 28, 2024, Brown joined the Mexico City Capitanes.

=== Calgary Surge (2025) ===
On April 2, 2025, Brown signed with the Calgary Surge of the Canadian Elite Basketball League. Brown averaged 19.7 points, 8.2 and 1.8 blocks in 23 games played with Calgary. He was the runner-up for CEBL Defensive Player of the Year and was named a CEBL First Team All Star.

=== AEK Athens (2025–present) ===
On November 12, 2025, Brown III signed with AEK Athens of the Greek Basket League. On March 16, he extended his contract with the club until 2027.

== Career statistics ==
Legend
GP	Games played	GS	Games started	MPG	Minutes per game
FG%	Field goal percentage	3P%	3-point field goal percentage	FT%	Free throw percentage
RPG	Rebounds per game	APG	Assists per game	SPG	Steals per game
BPG	Blocks per game	PPG	Points per game	**Bold**	Career high

=== NBA ===
Year	Team	GP	GS	MPG	FG%	3P%	FT%	RPG	APG	SPG	BPG	PPG
2021–22	Portland	**48**	**6**	**13.3**	.426	.311	**.677**	**2.8**	**.7**	**.5**	.5	**4.7**
2022–23	Portland	16	0	5.8	.393	.143	.417	1.2	.2	.3	.3	1.8
2023–24	Dallas	6	0	6.6	**.455**	**.333**	.444	1.5	**.7**	.0	**.7**	2.5
Career		70	6	11.0	.424	.296	.616	2.3	.6	.4	.5	3.8

=== College ===
Year	Team	GP	GS	MPG	FG%	3P%	FT%	RPG	APG	SPG	BPG	PPG
2020–21	Texas	26	24	20.6	.420	.330	.708	6.2	.4	.6	1.0	9.3

== Personal life ==
Brown's grandfather, Greg Brown, Sr., played wide receiver for Grambling from 1971 to 1974. His father, Greg Brown, Jr., played college football as a safety for Texas before playing in the NFL Europe, stints at camp and on the practice squads of the Denver Broncos and Tampa Bay Buccaneers of the National Football League, with the Austin Wranglers of the Arena Football League and with the CenTex Barracudas of the Intense Football League.

Brown's uncle, Roderick Anderson, played college basketball as a point guard for Texas before playing professionally overseas.
