= Albert Burditt =

American basketball player (born 1972)

Personal information
- Born: May 15, 1972 (age 54) Austin, Texas, U.S.
- Listed height: 6 ft 8 in (2.03 m)
- Listed weight: 230 lb (104 kg)

Career information
- High school: Lanier (Austin, Texas)
- College: Texas (1990–1994)
- NBA draft: 1994: 2nd round, 53rd overall pick
- Drafted by: Houston Rockets
- Playing career: 1994–2009
- Position: Power forward

Career history
- 1994–1995: Oklahoma City Cavalry
- 1995–1998: Gran Canaria
- 1996: Gigantes de Carolina
- 1997: Santeros de Aguada
- 1999: Sioux Falls Skyforce
- 1999: Andrea Costa Imola
- 1999–2000: Cordivari Roseto
- 2000–2001: Pallacanestro Varese
- 2001–2002: Pallacanestro Reggiana
- 2002–2003: Carife Ferrara
- 2003: Sioux Falls Skyforce
- 2003–2004: Benfica
- 2004–2005: Sioux Falls Skyforce
- 2005–2006: Cometas de Querétaro
- 2006–2007: Belgrano de San Nicolás
- 2007–2009: Lobos de la UAC Saltillo
- 2008: Plannja Basket
- 2009: La Salle-UPB Cochabamba

Career highlights
- CBA All-Rookie First Team (1995); Texas Mr. Basketball (1990)
- Stats at Basketball Reference

Albert Lajuane Burditt (born May 15, 1972) is an American former basketball player. He played for four years at the University of Texas at Austin, before being selected by the Houston Rockets in the 1994 NBA draft. However, he did not play in the NBA. Burditt played for the Oklahoma City Cavalry of the Continental Basketball Association in the 1994–1995 season, averaging 8.4 points and 8.1 rebounds per game. He was selected to the CBA All-Rookie First Team in 1995. Burditt played professionally in the CBA and nine other countries.
