= Joey Wright =

American-Australian basketball player and coach

Personal information
- Born: September 4, 1968 (age 58) Alton, Illinois, U.S.
- Listed height: 6 ft 3 in (1.91 m)
- Listed weight: 185 lb (84 kg)

Career information
- High school: Gavit (Hammond, Indiana)
- College: Drake (1986–1987); Texas (1988–1991)
- NBA draft: 1991: 2nd round, 50th overall pick
- Drafted by: Phoenix Suns
- Playing career: 1991–1996
- Position: Point guard
- Coaching career: 1997–present

Career history

Playing
- 1992: Presto Ice Cream Kings
- 1993–1994: APOEL B.C.
- 1995–1996: Geelong Supercats

Coaching
- 1997–1998: Austin Cyclones
- 2001–2002: Regents School of Austin
- 2002–2003: St. Edward's (assistant)
- 2002–2008: Brisbane Bullets
- 2008: Seastar APOEL
- 2009–2012: Gold Coast Blaze
- 2013–2020: Adelaide 36ers

Career highlights
- As player: First-team All-SWC (1991); As coach: NBL champion (2007); 3× NBL Coach of the Year (2004, 2007, 2017)
- Stats at Basketball Reference

Joey Glenn Wright (born September 4, 1968) is an American-Australian professional basketball coach and former player. He has been the head coach of three teams in the Australian National Basketball League: the Brisbane Bullets, which won an NBL championship in 2007, the now-defunct Gold Coast Blaze and the Adelaide 36ers. He is a three-time NBL Coach of the Year (2003–04, 2006–07 and 2016–17), and was inducted into the Indiana Basketball Hall of Fame in 2011.

== College career ==
Wright was born in Alton, Illinois and enrolled at Drake University in Des Moines, Iowa after high school. He played on the Drake Bulldogs basketball squad during the 1986–87 NCAA season but received little playing time on the court. Wright transferred after his freshman year to the University of Texas for a chance to play with the school's prestigious Longhorns basketball team. After sitting out as a redshirt sophomore in 1987–88, Wright was selected as the Longhorn's point guard from 1988 through 1991. Wright and teammates' Lance Blanks and Travis Mays stellar offensive performance dubbed the trio as the "BMW Scoring Machine" during the 1989–90 basketball season. Wright was particularly known for his hustling and effective jump shots that greatly helped contribute to the "Scoring Machine". The Longhorn team won the Southwest Conference tournament that season and advanced to the Elite Eight in the 1990 NCAA Men's Division I Basketball Tournament.

== Professional basketball career ==
Wright spent the spring of 1991 at the Chicago National Basketball Association tryout camp, where he showcased a high field goal percentage and averaged nearly ten points a game. He even caught the eye of the Boston Celtics, who expressed an interest in Joey Wright during the tryouts. However the Celtics eventually passed up on Wright, whose lack in quickness and size were looked down upon. Wright was nonetheless projected to be drafted in either the late 1st or early 2nd round of the 1991 NBA draft. Several weeks later he was selected at the tail end of the 2nd round as the 50th pick of the NBA Draft by the Phoenix Suns. Friends and Longhorn teammates celebrated the announcement at Joey Wright's apartment; but despite all the excitement the former University of Texas basketball star was much concerned with his low draft pick. Joey Wright was released by the Suns prior to the 1991–92 NBA season. Although Wright played overseas for several years, he never appeared in an NBA game.

Wright played for the Geelong Supercats during the 1995 and 1996 NBL seasons.

== Coaching career ==
Drawing upon previous coaching experience with the Austin Cyclones in the Southwest Basketball League (USA) and other US teams, Wright sought a coaching contract in the NBL. He was appointed as the Brisbane Bullets' head coach midway through the 2002–03 season; a position which he held until 2008. Wright led the team to great heights including a 16-win improvement in the following 2003–04 season, successive finals appearances and a stellar 2006–07 season featuring a minor premiership, a 21 NBL game winning streak and a championship.

After the Blaze folded at the end of the 2011–12 NBL season, Wright sat out 2012–13 before being signed as head coach of the Adelaide 36ers for the 2013–14 NBL season. The 36ers, who had finished last in three of the previous four NBL seasons, finished second in the season, with Joey Wright named the NBL's Coach of the Month for November after leading the 36ers to a 5–0 record for the month which included a 91–86 home win at the Adelaide Arena over the previously undefeated Perth Wildcats on November 22, 2013. Wright helped revive the 36ers fortunes and the team went from the bottom of the NBL ladder to playing in the NBL Grand Final in his first season with the club, though they ultimately were beaten 2–1 in the Grand Final series by the Wildcats.

With Wright having lifted the 36ers from the bottom of the ladder to the NBL Grand Final in just one season, most were shocked when the NBL named Wollongong Hawks coach Gordie McLeod as the NBL's Coach of the Year for season 2013–14. Adelaide had improved from an 8–20 record in 2012–13 to 18–10 in 2013–14 while Wollongong, finalists in 2012–13 with a 13–15 record also finished 2013–14 with the same 13–15 record.

Adelaide again made it to the Semi-finals in 2014–15, but missed the playoffs in 2015–16. In the 2016–17 NBL season, the 36ers started off slowly winning just 3 of their first 9 games. However, from there they became the team to beat, winning 14 of their next 15 games and by Round 16 of the 19 round, 28-game season had been confirmed as regular season champions for the first time since 1999–2000. The 36ers finished the season with a 17–11 record, two games clear of the second placed Cairns Taipans. Wright won the Coach of the Month award in November, December and January, going undefeated in December. As a result, Wright won his 3rd Coach of the Year award on February 13, 2017, joining Brian Goorjian and Lindsay Gaze (who the CotY award is named for) as a 3-time winner of the award. At the season's conclusion, Wright signed a five-year contract extension with the 36ers.

On 26 February 2020, Wright and the Adelaide 36ers parted ways, citing a mutual agreement following an end of season review. The 36ers and NBL investigated Wright over bullying allegations made by team co-captain Kevin White.

== Personal life ==
Wright later pursued a career outside of sports in the Texas real estate industry. He operates two businesses at his home in Austin, Texas but spends his time overseas in Australia as a basketball coach. He has four children. His daughter Sydney Wright has played basketball professionally in Europe and Australia. He is married to his second wife Helen.

Wright received Australian citizenship in September 2020.

Wright is a co-host of podcast Time Out - No Flop Zone alongside journalist Boti Nagy.
