= Raymond Downs =

American basketball player

Raymond Downs is an American former college basketball player for the University of Texas at Austin. Downs was a three-year starter for the Texas Longhorns men's basketball team under head coaches Thurman "Slue" Hull (1955–56) and Marshall Hughes (1957). He received recognition as a two-time all-Southwest Conference and two-time second-team All-American forward in 1956 and 1957.

Downs led the Longhorns in scoring in all three of his seasons at Texas. In his junior season, Downs scored an average of 26.4 points per game—an achievement that remains the UT record for highest season scoring average. He also holds the second-highest career scoring average for a Texas men's basketball player with 22.3 points per game, trailing only Kevin Durant. Downs continues to hold the record for most games scoring 30 or more points with 18. He also tied Slater Martin's UT's single-game scoring record with 49 points against Baylor in Waco, although his 49 points represent the highest single-game points total for a Texas player in a road game.

Downs was selected in the sixth round of the 1957 NBA draft (44th overall selection) by the St. Louis Hawks.

When only 8 years old, Downs survived the sinking of the merchant freighter Heredia on May 18, 1942, by the German U-boat U-506. He and his family were returning from Colombia where his father had been working. Downs, his parents and his sister all survived the sinking, which killed 36 on board.
