= Jim Krivacs =

American basketball player

Personal information
- Born: c. 1957 Indianapolis, Indiana, U.S.
- Listed height: 6 ft 1 in (1.85 m)
- Listed weight: 160 lb (73 kg)

Career information
- High school: Southport (Indianapolis, Indiana)
- College: Auburn (1974–1975); Texas (1976–1979)
- NBA draft: 1978: 6th round, 114th overall pick
- Drafted by: Kansas City Kings
- Position: Point guard

Career highlights
- 2× AP Honorable mention All-American (1978, 1979); NIT co-MVP (1978)
- Stats at Basketball Reference

Jim Krivacs (/ˈkriːvæks/ KREE-vaks; born c. 1957) is an American former college basketball player for the University of Texas at Austin.

Krivacs transferred to Texas from Auburn and was a three-year starter for the Longhorns under head coach Abe Lemons, beginning in Lemons' first year at Texas. He twice earned All-America honors—as a first-team All-America selection as a junior in 1978 and as a second-team selection in 1979. Krivacs led the Longhorns in scoring as a sophomore and junior and was second in scoring as a senior. He scored an average of 22.0 points per game in 1978 and 19.5 points per game for his three-year Texas career. His career point total and career scoring average remain eighth- and sixth-highest, respectively, in program history.

In 1978, Krivacs helped to lead Texas to a 26–5 overall record, a share of the Southwest Conference championship, the 1978 National Invitation Tournament championship, and a final ranking of No. 17 in the Associated Press Poll. Along with teammate Ron Baxter, he was named co-MVP of the 1978 NIT. As a senior, Krivacs helped to lead the 1979 Longhorns to a 21–8 overall record, a share of the Southwest Conference championship for the second consecutive season, an appearance in the 1979 NCAA Tournament, and a No. 15 final ranking in the Coaches Poll. In 1979, he was the first Texas men's basketball player to receive recognition as a first-team Academic All-American. Krivacs was selected in the sixth round of the 1979 NBA draft by the Kansas City Kings.

Krivacs later became a sports agent whose clients included Don Mattingly, Tino Martinez and Fred McGriff.
