= D. J. Augustin =

American basketball player (born 1987)

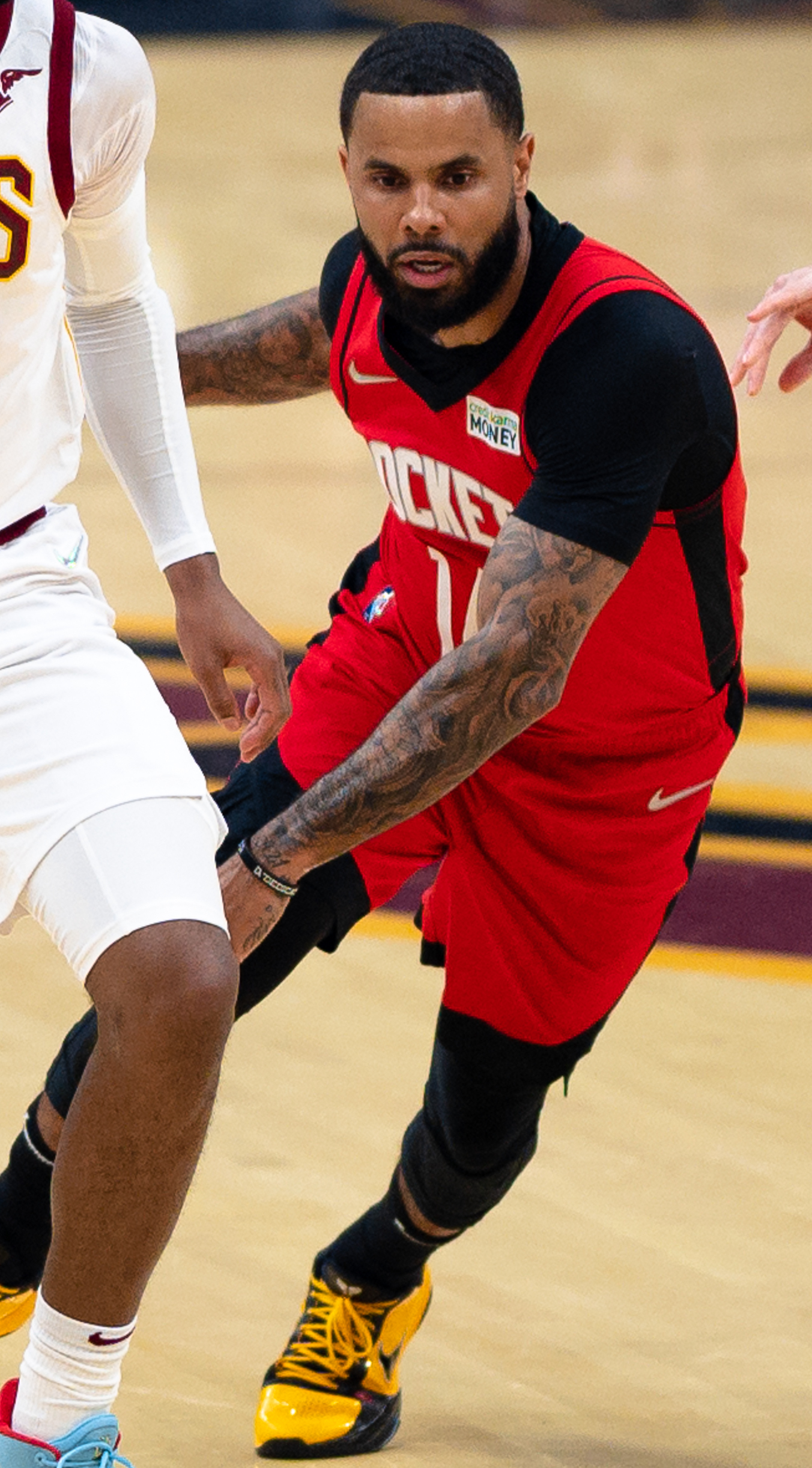
- Augustin with the Houston Rockets in 2021

Personal information
- Born: November 10, 1987 (age 39) New Orleans, Louisiana, U.S.
- Listed height: 5 ft 11 in (1.80 m)
- Listed weight: 183 lb (83 kg)

Career information
- High school: Brother Martin (New Orleans, Louisiana); Hightower (Missouri City, Texas)
- College: Texas (2006–2008)
- NBA draft: 2008: 1st round, 9th overall pick
- Drafted by: Charlotte Bobcats
- Playing career: 2008–2022
- Position: Point guard
- Number: 14, 12, 4

Career history
- 2008–2012: Charlotte Bobcats
- 2012–2013: Indiana Pacers
- 2013: Toronto Raptors
- 2013–2014: Chicago Bulls
- 2014–2015: Detroit Pistons
- 2015–2016: Oklahoma City Thunder
- 2016: Denver Nuggets
- 2016–2020: Orlando Magic
- 2020–2021: Milwaukee Bucks
- 2021–2022: Houston Rockets
- 2022: Los Angeles Lakers

Career highlights
- NBA All-Rookie Second Team (2009); Bob Cousy Award (2008); Consensus first-team All-American (2008); First-team All-Big 12 (2008); Second-team All-Big 12 (2007); Big 12 All-Rookie Team (2007); McDonald's All-American (2006); Fourth-team Parade All-American (2006)

Career NBA statistics
- Points: 9,259 (9.5 ppg)
- Rebounds: 1,805 (1.8 rpg)
- Assists: 3,761 (3.9 apg)
- Stats at NBA.com
- Stats at Basketball Reference

Darryl Gerard "D. J." Augustin Jr. (born November 10, 1987) is an American former professional basketball player who played for 14 seasons in the National Basketball Association (NBA). He played college basketball for the Texas Longhorns from 2006 to 2008. He was drafted ninth overall by the Charlotte Bobcats in the 2008 NBA draft.

== Early life ==
Augustin was born in New Orleans, Louisiana. His family was forced out of New Orleans by Hurricane Katrina in 2005. He played his senior year at Hightower High School in Missouri City, Texas; however, he earned his diploma from Brother Martin High School in New Orleans, and he participated in the graduation ceremonies with his Hightower classmates on May 28, 2006, at the Toyota Center in Houston, Texas. While at Brother Martin, Augustin led the team to two state championships.

While at Hightower, Augustin thrilled the Hightower faithful with his pinpoint passing and precise shooting. His first game as a Hurricane was against Madison High School, and Augustin nearly pulled off a triple-double with 29 points, 8 rebounds and 14 assists in an 83–59 victory. He led Hightower to the third round of the playoffs before they were eliminated, and ended the season at 26–4. Augustin won numerous honors after the season as he was named district 20-5A MVP, was named as the Houston Chronicle player of the year, made the first team all Greater Houston, and first team all state teams. Augustin finished his high school career by being named a McDonald's All American, and started as point guard for the West squad against his soon to be teammate at Texas, Kevin Durant. He was also a fourth-team Parade All-American.

Considered a four-star recruit by Rivals.com, Augustin was listed as the No. 6 point guard and the No. 49 player in the nation in 2006.

== College career ==
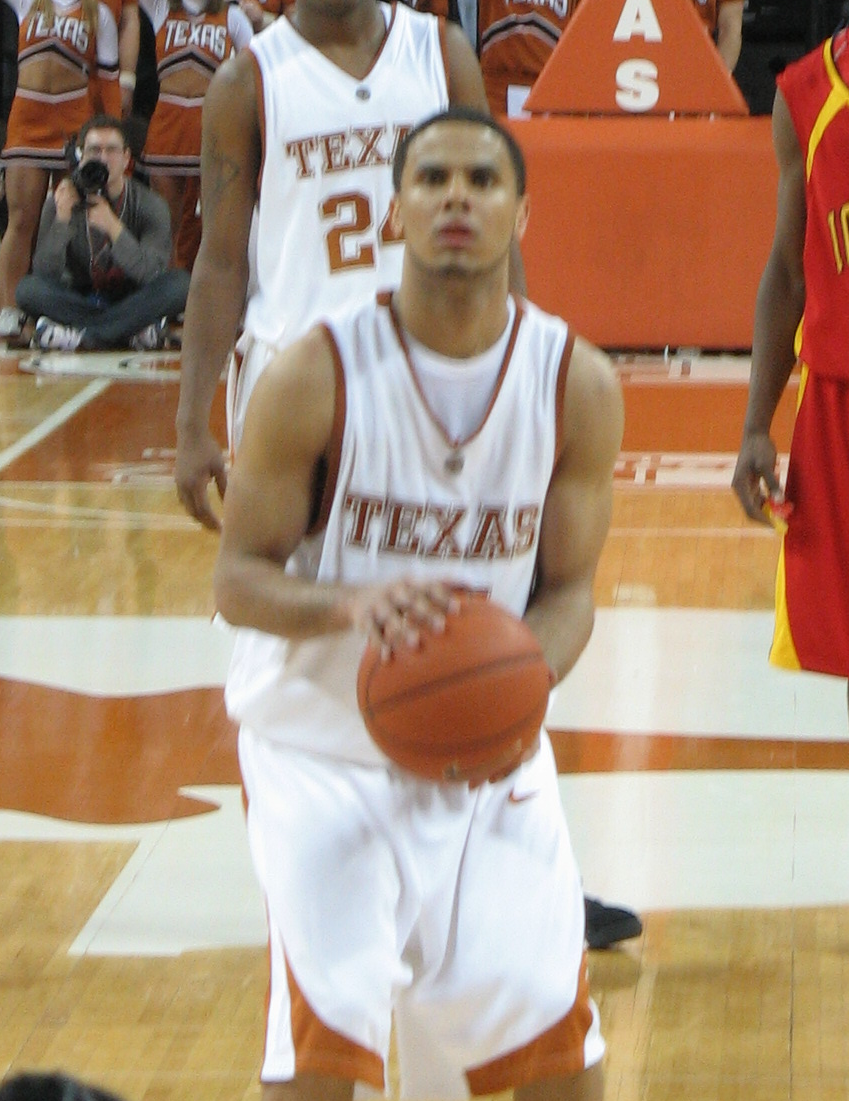
Augustin as a Texas Longhorn in 2007

=== Freshman year ===
Augustin was one of seven freshman to join the Longhorn basketball program for the 2006–07 season. He started all 35 games in the season as the point guard for the Longhorns, averaging 14.4 points and 6.7 assists per game. For his contributions, he was named to both the All-Big 12 Second Team and the Big 12 All-Rookie Team by Big 12 coaches and Associated Press.

Augustin had a chance to participate in the 2007 NBA draft with Longhorn teammate Kevin Durant, but he chose to stay in school to develop his game more with the Longhorns.

=== Sophomore year ===
Augustin, along with Texas A&M Aggies player Joseph Jones, was featured on the front cover of the November 15, 2007 issue of Sports Illustrated.

In the fall 2007 semester, he achieved a 4.0 GPA, raising his cumulative GPA to a 3.64. On February 27, 2008, he was named first-team Academic All-America by the College Sports Information Directors of America. He became the second Texas Longhorn basketball player to achieve the honor, following Jim Krivacs, who received it in 1979. Augustin was also named to the USBWA All-America First Team.

On April 3, 2008, the Naismith Memorial Basketball Hall of Fame awarded him the Bob Cousy Award.

On April 23, 2008, Augustin declared himself eligible for the NBA Draft. On June 3, 2008, Augustin hired an agent thereby forfeiting his remaining NCAA eligibility.

== Professional career ==
=== Charlotte Bobcats (2008–2012) ===
Augustin was selected with the ninth overall pick in the 2008 NBA draft by the Charlotte Bobcats. On July 8, 2008, he was signed to the rookie scale contract. Under the league's rookie scale, the deal would pay him $1.8 million in the upcoming season and nearly $2 million the next. On October 30, he made his professional debut in a 96–79 loss to the Cleveland Cavaliers, recording 12 points and two assists in 25 minutes.

On October 6, 2009, the Bobcats picked up the third-year option on Augustin's contract. On October 29, 2010, the Bobcats picked up the fourth-year option on Augustin's contract.

On January 20, 2011, Augustin led all scorers with 32 points and added 8 assists in a 100–97 victory over the Philadelphia 76ers. The 2010–11 season would be arguably the most productive of Augustin's career, as he started all 82 games while averaging 33.6 minutes, scoring 14.4 points and recording 6.1 assists per contest.

On June 29, 2012, the Bobcats extended a qualifying offer to Augustin, making him a restricted free agent. However, on July 12, they withdrew the offer, making him an unrestricted free agent.

=== Indiana Pacers (2012–2013) ===
On July 13, 2012, he signed with the Indiana Pacers. On October 31, he made his debut with the Pacers in a 90–88 win over the Toronto Raptors, recording five points, one rebound, two assists and one steal in 15 minutes.

=== Toronto Raptors (2013) ===
On July 22, 2013, Augustin signed with the Toronto Raptors. On October 30, he made his debut for the Raptors in a 93–87 win over the Boston Celtics, recording five points and two assists in 13 minutes. On December 9, Augustin was waived by the Raptors.

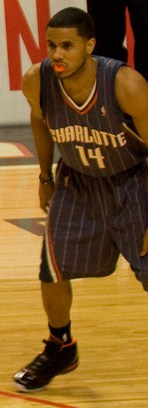
Augustin with the Bobcats in 2009

=== Chicago Bulls (2013–2014) ===
On December 13, 2013, Augustin signed with the Chicago Bulls. On January 11, 2014, Augustin recorded a season-high 12 assists in a 103–97 win over the Charlotte Bobcats. On March 30, 2014, Augustin scored a then career-high 33 points in a 107–102 win over the Boston Celtics.

=== Detroit Pistons (2014–2015) ===
On July 15, 2014, Augustin signed a two-year, $6 million contract with the Detroit Pistons. On January 25, 2015, in his first game as a starter, replacing the injured Brandon Jennings, Augustin scored a career-high 35 points in a 110–114 loss to the Toronto Raptors.

=== Oklahoma City Thunder (2015–2016) ===
On February 19, 2015, Augustin was traded to the Oklahoma City Thunder in a three-team deal that also involved the Utah Jazz, a move that reunited him with his ex-college teammate Kevin Durant. Two days later, he made his debut for the Thunder in a 110–103 win over the Charlotte Hornets, recording 12 points, three rebounds and two assists in 23 minutes off the bench.

=== Denver Nuggets (2016) ===
On February 18, 2016, Augustin was traded, along with Steve Novak, two second-round picks and cash consideration, to the Denver Nuggets in exchange for Randy Foye. The next day, he made his debut for the Nuggets in a 116–110 loss to the Sacramento Kings, recording eight points, six assists and three steals in 19 minutes. On March 2, 2016, Augustin recorded a season-high 26 points in a 117–107 win over the Los Angeles Lakers. On March 12, 2016, Augustin recorded his first double-double of the season with 17 points and 10 assists in a 116–100 win over the Washington Wizards. Augustin recorded his second double-double on March 27, 2016, recording 18 points and 10 assists in a 105–90 loss to the Los Angeles Clippers.

=== Orlando Magic (2016–2020) ===
On July 7, 2016, Augustin signed a four-year, $29 million contract with the Orlando Magic. On January 29, 2017, he scored a season-high 21 points against the Toronto Raptors.

On March 14, 2018, Augustin scored a season-high 32 points against the Milwaukee Bucks. On March 24, 2018, he had a near triple-double with 15 points, 10 assists and nine rebounds in a 105–99 win over the Phoenix Suns.

On December 26, 2018, Augustin scored a season-high 27 points in a 122–120 overtime loss to the Suns. On April 13, 2019, Augustin scored 25 points and hit the game-winning 3-pointer in the Magic's 104–101 upset victory over the Toronto Raptors in game one of the first round of the playoffs. Despite this, the Magic lost the series in 5 games.

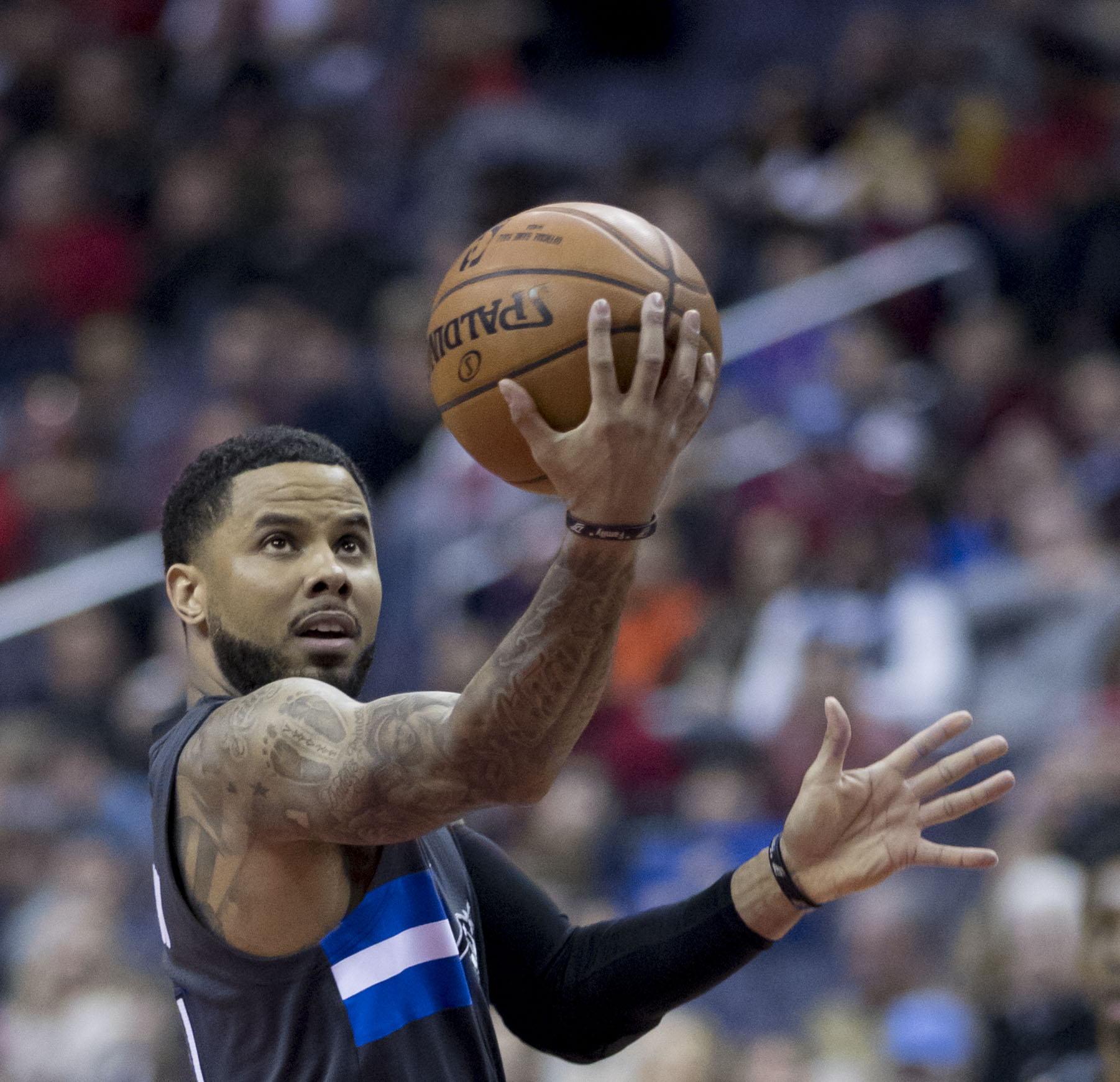
Augustin with the Magic in 2017

The following season in the NBA Bubble, in another round one upset victory, Augustin helped the Magic beat the top-seeded Milwaukee Bucks with 11 points and 11 assists in a 122-110 Game 1 win. However, the Magic eventually lost the series.

=== Milwaukee Bucks (2020–2021) ===
On November 28, 2020, Augustin signed a three-year, $21 million contract with the Milwaukee Bucks. He made his debut for the team on December 25, scoring 13 points in a 138–99 Christmas Day win over the Golden State Warriors.

=== Houston Rockets (2021–2022) ===
On March 18, 2021, Augustin was traded, alongside D. J. Wilson and a 2023 first-round pick, to the Houston Rockets in exchange for P. J. Tucker and Rodions Kurucs. He made his debut in a 113–100 loss against Detroit Pistons on March 19, logging seven points, three rebounds, and three assists. On May 10, Augustin scored a season-high 21 points in a 129–140 loss to the Portland Trail Blazers.

On December 13, 2021, Augustin scored a season-high 22 points in a 132–126 win over the Atlanta Hawks. On February 10, 2022, he was waived by the Rockets.

=== Los Angeles Lakers (2022) ===
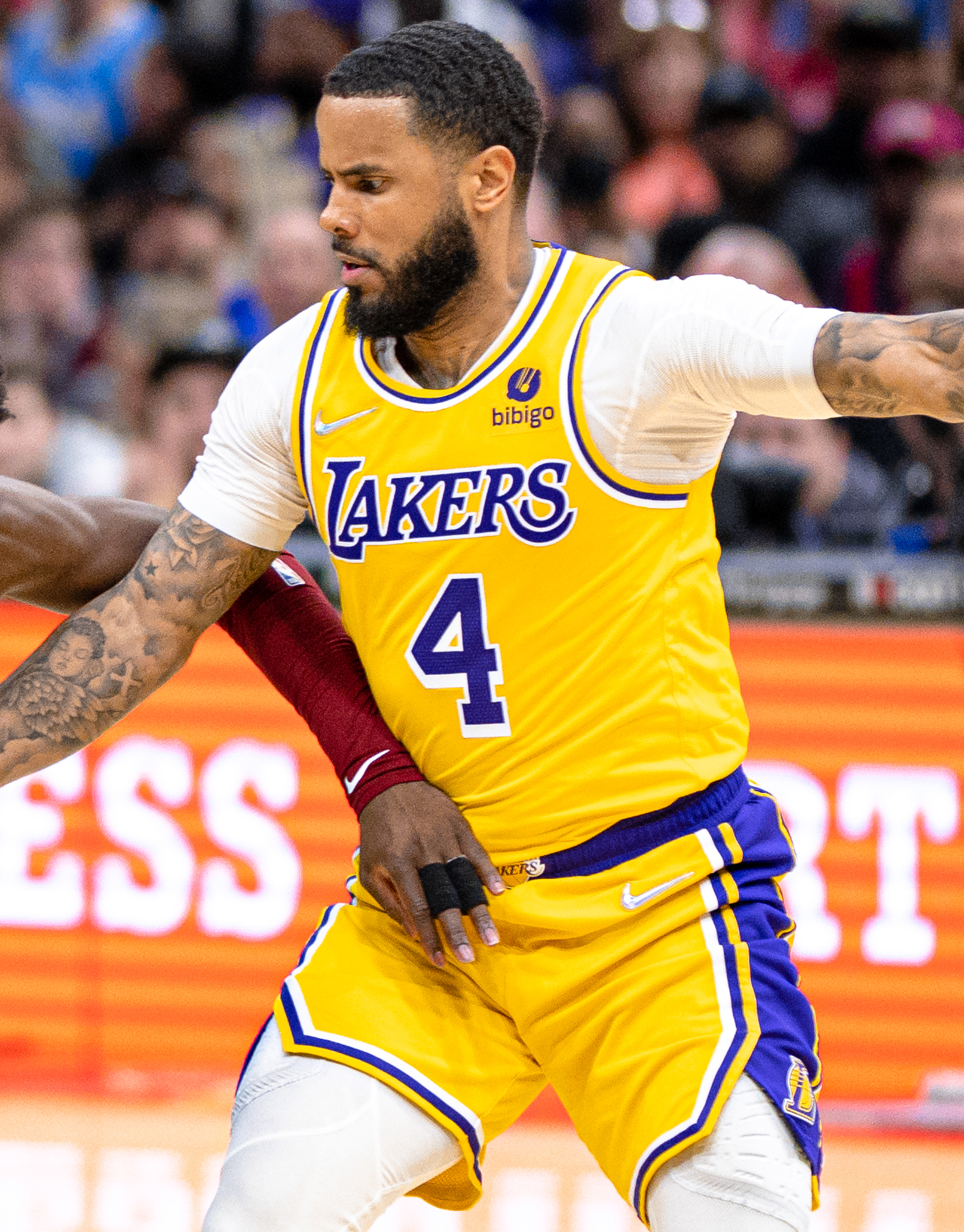
Augustin with the Lakers in 2022

On March 1, 2022, Augustin signed with the Los Angeles Lakers. He made his debut for the team two days later, logging three points, six assists and three steals in a 111–132 loss to the Los Angeles Clippers.

On March 23, 2023, Augustin signed with the Houston Rockets, returning for a second stint with the franchise. However, he did not appear in a game for the Rockets during the 2022–23 season.

On November 3, 2024, Augustin announced his retirement from basketball.

== Executive career ==
On June 5, 2025, Augustin joined the front office of the Houston Rockets.

== NBA career statistics ==
Legend
GP	Games played	GS	Games started	MPG	Minutes per game
FG%	Field goal percentage	3P%	3-point field goal percentage	FT%	Free throw percentage
RPG	Rebounds per game	APG	Assists per game	SPG	Steals per game
BPG	Blocks per game	PPG	Points per game	**Bold**	Career high
*	Led the league

=== NBA ===
==== Regular season ====
Year	Team	GP	GS	MPG	FG%	3P%	FT%	RPG	APG	SPG	BPG	PPG
2008–09	Charlotte	72	12	26.5	.430	**.439**	.893	1.8	3.5	.6	.0	11.8
2009–10	Charlotte	80	2	18.4	.386	.393	.779	1.2	2.4	.6	**.1**	6.3
2010–11	Charlotte	**82**	**82***	**33.6**	.416	.333	.906	**2.7**	6.1	.7	.0	14.4
2011–12	Charlotte	48	46	29.3	.376	.341	.875	2.3	**6.4**	.8	.0	11.1
2012–13	Indiana	76	5	16.1	.350	.353	.838	1.2	2.2	.4	.0	4.7
2013–14	Toronto	10	0	8.2	.292	.091	**1.000**	.4	1.0	.1	.0	2.1
2013–14	Chicago	61	9	30.4	.419	.411	.882	2.1	5.0	**.9**	.0	**14.9**
2014–15	Detroit	54	13	23.8	.410	.327	.870	1.9	4.9	.6	.0	10.6
2014–15	Oklahoma City	28	1	24.2	.371	.354	.861	2.2	3.1	.6	.0	7.3
2015–16	Oklahoma City	34	0	15.3	.380	.393	.765	1.3	1.9	.4	**.1**	4.2
2015–16	Denver	28	0	23.5	.445	.411	.819	1.9	4.7	**.9**	**.1**	11.6
2016–17	Orlando	78	20	19.7	.377	.347	.814	1.5	2.7	.4	.0	7.9
2017–18	Orlando	75	36	23.5	.452	.419	.868	2.1	3.8	.7	.0	10.2
2018–19	Orlando	81	81	28.0	**.470**	.421	.866	2.5	5.3	.6	.0	11.7
2019–20	Orlando	57	13	24.9	.399	.348	.890	2.1	4.6	.6	.0	10.5
2020–21	Milwaukee	37	6	19.3	.370	.380	.900	1.4	3.0	.5	.0	6.1
2020–21	Houston	20	6	20.8	.424	.385	.900	2.2	3.9	.4	.0	10.6
2021–22	Houston	34	2	15.0	.404	.406	.868	1.2	2.2	.3	.0	5.4
2021–22	L.A. Lakers	21	0	17.8	.453	.426	**1.000**	1.3	1.6	.3	.0	5.3
Career		976	334	23.4	.412	.381	.867	1.8	3.9	.6	.0	9.5

==== Playoffs ====
Year	Team	GP	GS	MPG	FG%	3P%	FT%	RPG	APG	SPG	BPG	PPG
2010	Charlotte	4	0	18.3	.294	.333	.833	1.0	1.8	.3	**.3**	4.3
2013	Indiana	**19**	1	16.6	.380	.396	.806	.8	.7	.4	.0	5.2
2014	Chicago	5	0	**28.2**	.292	.269	.895	1.6	4.8	**.6**	.0	**13.2**
2019	Orlando	5	**5**	**28.2**	**.488**	**.476**	.875	1.6	3.8	.4	.2	12.8
2020	Orlando	5	0	25.6	.391	.471	**.957**	**2.0**	**6.0**	.2	.0	**13.2**
Career		38	6	21.0	.368	.390	.874	1.2	2.4	.4	.1	8.2

=== College ===
Year	Team	GP	GS	MPG	FG%	3P%	FT%	RPG	APG	SPG	BPG	PPG
2006–07	Texas	35	35	35.6	**.449**	**.441**	**.838**	2.8	**6.7**	**1.5**	**.1**	14.4
2007–08	Texas	**38**	**38**	**37.3**	.439	.381	.783	**2.9**	5.8	1.2	.0	**19.2**
Career		73	73	36.5	.443	.402	.808	2.9	6.2	1.4	.0	16.9

== Awards and honors ==
=== High school ===
- 2004 New Orleans Times-Picayune Player of the Year
- 2004, 2005 Louisiana State 5A Basketball Championship Tournament MVP
- 2006 McDonald's All-American
- 2006 Parade fourth-team All-American
- 2006 Texas Association of Basketball Coaches (TABC) Class 5A All-State Team
- 2006 Texas District 20-5A MVP

=== College ===
- 2006–2007 Four-time recipient of Phillips 66 Big 12 Rookie of the Week award (Dec 11, Jan 22, Feb 12 and Mar. 5)
- 2007 Associated Press Honorable Mention All-America Team
- 2007 All-Big 12 Second Team
- 2007 Big 12 All-Rookie Team
- 2007 USBWA All-District VII team (one of 10 players selected)
- 2007 NABC All-District 9 First Team
- 2008 Sports Illustrated First Team All-American
- 2008 ESPN The Magazine Academic All-America University Division First Team
- 2008 Academic All-Big 12 First Team
- 2008 Bob Cousy Award winner
- 2008 USBWA First Team All-American
- 2008 USBWA District VII Player of the Year
- 2008 Wooden Award and Naismith Trophy candidate
- 2008 Oscar Robertson Trophy finalist (one of 10)
- 2007–08 Stub Hub Legends Classic MVP
- 2007–08 Phillips 66 Big 12 Co-Player of the Week (Jan. 7); Phillips 66 Big 12 Player of the Week (Dec. 10); The Sporting News National Player of the Week (Dec. 3)
- 2008 NABC All-District 9 First Team
- 2008 All-Big 12 First Team
- 2008 Associated Press First Team All-American
- 2008 Wooden Award All-America Team (one of 5 finalists for award)

=== NBA ===
- 2009 All-Rookie second team

== See also ==
- List of National Basketball Association career free throw percentage leaders
- 2006 high school boys basketball All-Americans
