= Larry Robinson (Texas basketball) =

American basketball player

Personal information
- Listed height: 6 ft 6 in (1.98 m)

Career information
- High school: Hobbs (Hobbs, New Mexico)
- College: Texas (1971–1974)
- NBA draft: 1974: 4th round, 59th overall pick
- Drafted by: Houston Rockets
- Position: Forward

Career highlights
- 2× SWC Player of the Year (1972, 1974); 2× First-team All-SWC (1972, 1974)
- Stats at Basketball Reference

Larry Robinson is an American former professional basketball player better known for his college career at the University of Texas at Austin between 1971 and 1974. Robinson was the first African-American to sign a National Letter of Intent to play basketball at Texas and is considered a pioneer of racial integration at the school, which at the time was mostly Caucasian and predominantly a football school. A native of Hobbs, New Mexico, he was unheralded for most of Hobbs High School career. Texas head coach Leon Black recruited him however, and Robinson enrolled in the fall of 1970.

== College career ==
Due to NCAA rules at the time, freshmen were not eligible to play varsity sports, so Robinson was forced to play on the Texas freshmen basketball team in 1970–71. In the three years that followed, Robinson etched his name into the Longhorns record book. As a sophomore, Robinson led Texas to a Southwest Conference championship and NCAA Tournament appearance, where they made it to the Sweet Sixteen. He was named to the all-conference first-team as well as being voted as the Southwest Conference Player of the Year. As a junior, Texas did not win the conference nor get a postseason invitation. In Robinson's final year (1973–74), he once again led the Longhorns to a conference championship and NCAA Tournament appearance, where they lost in the first round. He earned his second all-conference team and conference player of the year honors. Robinson finished his collegiate career with 1,377 points and 623 rebounds.

== Professional career ==
He was selected in the 1974 NBA draft by the Houston Rockets in the fourth round, 59th overall, but never played in the league. Robinson instead played in Europe and spent 10 years in Sweden where he was a star, at one point averaging over 35 points per game for a season. In his post-basketball life, Robinson spent a long time as an executive for Converse in Europe. He was inducted into the University of Texas Hall of Honor in 1989.
