= Lance Blanks =

American basketball player (1966–2023)

Personal information
- Born: September 9, 1966 Del Rio, Texas, U.S.
- Died: May 3, 2023 (aged 56) Dallas, Texas, U.S.
- Listed height: 6 ft 4 in (1.93 m)
- Listed weight: 190 lb (86 kg)

Career information
- High school: McCullough (The Woodlands, Texas)
- College: Virginia (1985–1987); Texas (1988–1990)
- NBA draft: 1990: 1st round, 26th overall pick
- Drafted by: Detroit Pistons
- Playing career: 1990–1999
- Position: Point guard / shooting guard
- Number: 32, 21

Career history
- 1990–1992: Detroit Pistons
- 1992–1993: Minnesota Timberwolves
- 1993: Quad City Thunder
- 1993–1994: Oklahoma City Cavalry
- 1994–1995: Gießen 46ers
- 1997–1998: Albacomp Fehérvár
- 1998–1999: Keravnos

Career highlights
- Third-team Parade All-American (1985); Texas Mr. Basketball (1985)

Career NBA statistics
- Points: 289 (2.0 ppg)
- Rebounds: 110 (0.8 rpg)
- Assists: 117 (0.8 apg)
- Stats at NBA.com
- Stats at Basketball Reference

Lance Blanks (September 9, 1966 – May 3, 2023) was an American professional basketball player and executive who worked as an analyst for ESPN. He played in the National Basketball Association (NBA) for the Detroit Pistons and Minnesota Timberwolves. Blanks also spent several seasons playing in Europe. Blanks worked as the general manager of the Phoenix Suns from 2010 to 2013.

== Early life ==
Blanks was born on September 9, 1966, in Del Rio, Texas, to Sid Blanks, a football player who played in the American Football League and National Football League. Lance Blanks attended McCullough High School in The Woodlands, Texas, and was named Texas Mr. Basketball and a third-team Parade All-American in 1985.

== College career ==
Blanks played collegiately at the University of Virginia and the University of Texas at Austin. Blanks and Texas Longhorns teammates Travis Mays and Joey Wright were known as the "BMW Scoring Machine" during the 1989–90 season. That team finished third in the Southwest Conference and advanced to the Elite Eight in the 1990 NCAA tournament. Blanks drew strong criticism and gained many detractors for his on-court antics and unsportsmanlike, excessive celebration, such as at the Elite Eight of the 1990 tournament.

With 1,322 points, Blanks holds the record for the highest number of points by a two-year player and is the eighth-leading scorer in University of Texas history. Blanks ended his career at Texas as the all-time leader in steals and ranked fourth in career scoring average with 20.0 points per game.

Blanks was inducted into Texas Athletics' Longhorn Hall of Honor in 2007.

== Pro playing career ==
A guard, Blanks was selected by the Detroit Pistons in the first round of the 1990 NBA draft with the 26th overall pick. He had an undistinguished career as a player, playing 142 games in three NBA seasons with the Pistons and Minnesota Timberwolves. Afterwards, he played one season in the Continental Basketball Association and another three seasons in Europe, leading teams in Hungary and Cyprus to league titles.

== Post-playing career ==
Blanks joined the San Antonio Spurs in 2000 as a scout and was elevated to director of scouting in September 2002. He served as the Spurs' television analyst during the 2004–05 season.

Blanks worked five seasons as assistant general manager of the Cleveland Cavaliers from 2005 to 2010. From 2010 to 2013, Blanks served as the general manager of the Phoenix Suns.

From 2020 until his death in 2023, Blanks served as a television analyst for the Texas Longhorns on Longhorn Network.

== Personal life ==
Blanks's daughter, Riley, was a four-star recruit for the University of Virginia tennis team. His cousin Larvell Blanks was an infielder in Major League Baseball.

In 2019, Blanks hosted a symposium on concussive injuries, chronic traumatic encephalopathy (CTE), at the University of Texas's Center for Sports Communication & Media. His father had Parkinson's disease after playing professional football for years. Participants at the symposium discussed the effect of football on the human brain and the symbolic importance of the sport in American life. Blanks also worked with Basketball Without Borders.

Blanks died in Dallas, Texas, on May 3, 2023, at age 56. The cause was suicide.

== Career statistics ==
=== NBA ===
Legend
GP	Games played	GS	Games started	MPG	Minutes per game
FG%	Field goal percentage	3P%	3-point field goal percentage	FT%	Free throw percentage
RPG	Rebounds per game	APG	Assists per game	SPG	Steals per game
BPG	Blocks per game	PPG	Points per game	**Bold**	Career high

==== Regular season ====
Year	Team	GP	GS	MPG	FG%	3P%	FT%	RPG	APG	SPG	BPG	PPG
1990–91	Detroit	38	0	5.6	.426	.125	.714	.5	.7	.2	**.1**	1.7
1991–92	Detroit	43	0	4.4	**.455**	**.375**	**.727**	.5	.4	**.3**	.0	1.5
1992–93	Minnesota	**61**	**2**	**10.5**	.433	.256	.625	**1.1**	**1.2**	**.3**	**.1**	**2.6**
Career		142	2	7.6	.436	.253	.667	.8	.8	.3	.1	2.0

==== Playoffs ====
Year	Team	GP	GS	MPG	FG%	3P%	FT%	RPG	APG	SPG	BPG	PPG
1992	Detroit	1	0	10.0	.500	–	–	1.0	3.0	3.0	.0	2.0
