= Ron Baxter =

American basketball player

Personal information
- Born: June 18, 1958 (age 68) Los Angeles, California, U.S.
- Listed height: 6 ft 4 in (1.93 m)
- Listed weight: 215 lb (98 kg)

Career information
- High school: Dorsey (Los Angeles, California)
- College: Texas (1976–1980)
- NBA draft: 1980: 4th round, 91st overall pick
- Drafted by: Los Angeles Lakers
- Position: Shooting guard
- Number: 31

Career history
- 1982–1983: Reno Bighorns (CBA)

Career highlights
- AP Honorable mention All-American (1978); NIT co-MVP (1978); 2× First-team All-SWC (1978, 1980)
- Stats at Basketball Reference

Ron Baxter (born June 18, 1958) is an American former basketball shooting guard who played for the University of Texas men's basketball team from 1976 to 1980, and helped lead the Longhorns to the 1978 NIT championship. Baxter graduated school with the Texas record for rebounds (916) as well as points (1.897). His son, Paul Baxter, played basketball for Sam Houston State University.

== Honors ==
- Two-time first-team All-Southwest Conference pick (1978, 1980)
- Voted team MVP in 1977 and 1980
- Member of the 1978 NIT championship team
- Averaged double-digits in scoring in each of his four years
- Fourth in UT history in career points (1,897) and rebounds (919)
- Third in school history with 40 career double-doubles
- Inducted into the Longhorn Hall of Honor in 2001
