= Chris Owens (basketball) =

American basketball player (born 1979)

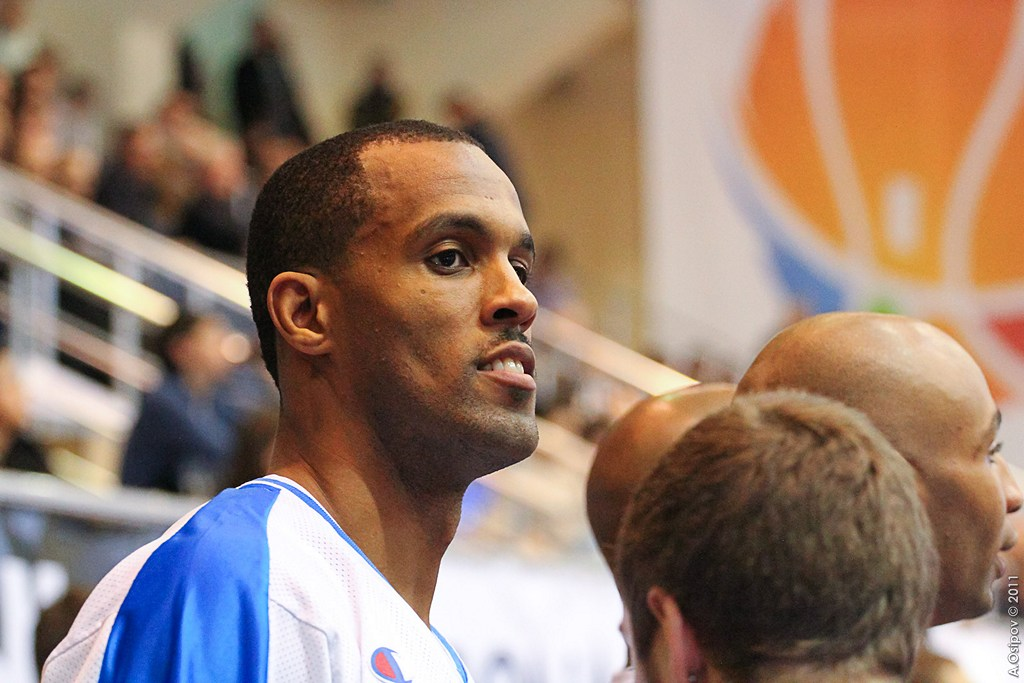
- Owens at the 2011 Ukrainian Superleague All-Star game

Personal information
- Born: March 1, 1979 (age 47) Akron, Ohio, U.S.
- Listed height: 6 ft 8 in (2.03 m)
- Listed weight: 250 lb (113 kg)

Career information
- High school: Duncanville (Duncanville, Texas)
- College: Tulane (1997–1998); Texas (1999–2002)
- NBA draft: 2002: 2nd round, 48th overall pick
- Drafted by: Milwaukee Bucks
- Playing career: 2002–2015
- Position: Power forward
- Number: 20

Career history
- 2002–2003: Memphis Grizzlies
- 2004: Cedar Rapids River Raiders
- 2004–2005: Banca Nuova Trapani
- 2005–2006: Granada
- 2006: Sioux Falls Skyforce
- 2006: Panionios
- 2006–2007: ALBA Berlin
- 2007–2008: Galatasaray
- 2008–2009: Donetsk
- 2010: Panellinios
- 2010: BCM Gravelines
- 2010–2011: Azovmash
- 2011–2012: Cedevita Zagreb
- 2013–2014: KTP-Basket
- 2014–2015: Argentino de Junín

Career highlights
- Second-team Parade All-American (1997); Texas Mr. Basketball (1997)
- Stats at NBA.com
- Stats at Basketball Reference
Medals
Men's Basketball
Representing the United States
Summer Universiade
Bronze medal – third place	2001 Beijing	Team competition

Haywood Christopher Owens (born March 1, 1979) is an American former professional basketball player who played briefly in the National Basketball Association (NBA). Standing at 6 ft 8 in (2.03 m), he played the power forward position.

== College career ==
Owens played one year at Tulane University before moving at The University of Texas at Austin, where he graduated in 2002. On December 29, 2001, he suffered a season ending knee injury in a loss against Utah.

== Professional career ==
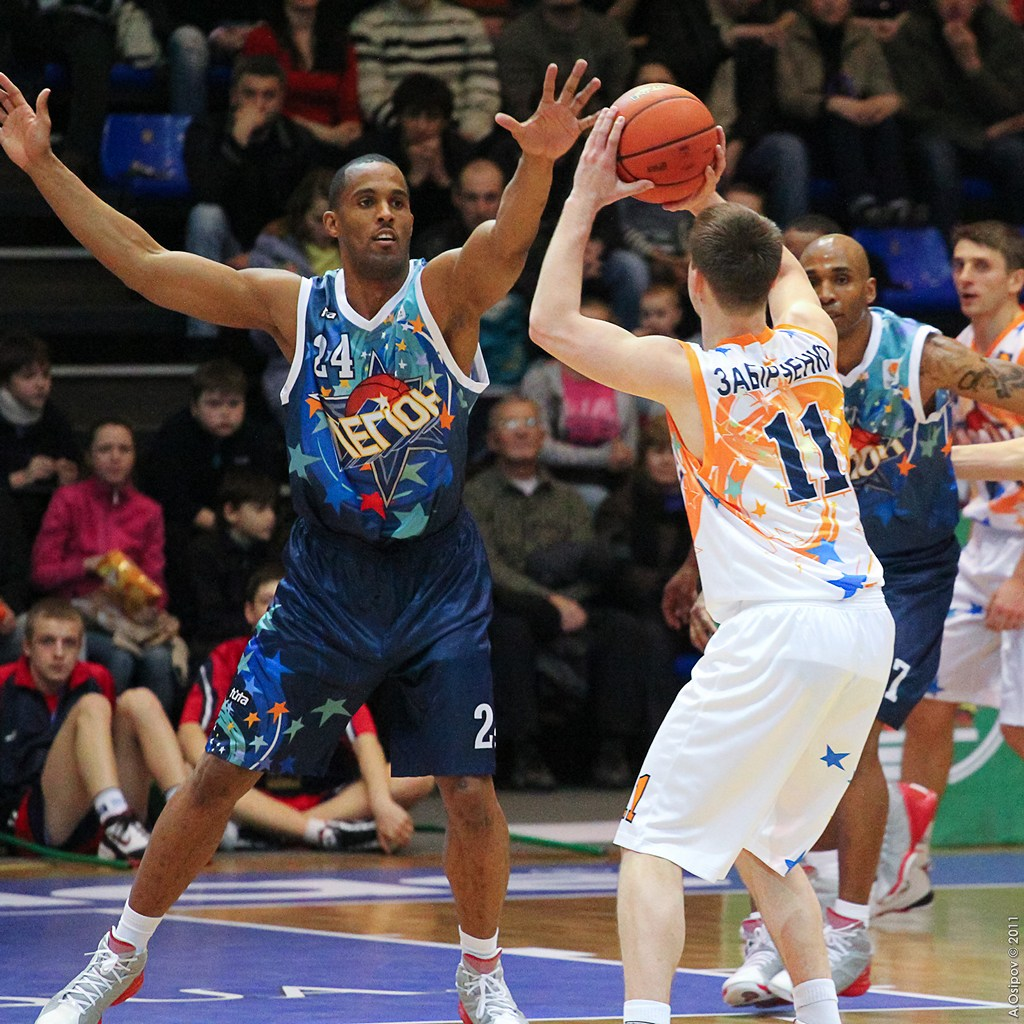
Owens at the Ukrainian All-Star game in 2011

Owens was selected by the Milwaukee Bucks in the 2nd round of the 2002 NBA draft, but he was then traded to the Memphis Grizzlies. He played in one NBA game with the Grizzlies.

Owens' first and only NBA game was played on April 15, 2003, in a 86 - 97 loss to the Houston Rockets where he recorded 4 points and 1 rebound.

He then played in the United States Basketball League with the Cedar Rapids River Raiders. He arrived in Europe in 2004, signing with Banca Nuova Trapani, with whom he played 30 games, averaging 19.1 points and 9.1 rebounds per game.

In 2005, he moved to CB Granada of the ACB League, but he was released in January 2006. He spent the rest of the season in the Continental Basketball Association with the Sioux Falls Skyforce and in the Greek Basket League with Panionios.

For the 2006–07 season he signed with ALBA Berlin of Germany. The following year, he moved to Galatasaray of the Turkish Basketball League.

In 2008, he moved to BC Donetsk in Ukraine. He stayed there until February 2010, when he signed with Panellinios.

In September 2010. Owens signed with Gravelines in France, but he played only 4 games in the French League. In November 2010, he returned to Ukraine and signed with Azovmash for the rest of the season.

For the 2011–12 season he signed with KK Cedevita of Croatia. In July 2013, he signed a one-year deal with KTP-Basket of Finland.

In September 2014, he signed with Argentino de Junín of Argentina.

== Personal life ==
He is the great-nephew of 1930s African-American track and field star, Jesse Owens, who won four gold medals at the 1936 Berlin Olympics.

== Career statistics ==
=== NBA ===
Legend
GP	Games played	GS	Games started	MPG	Minutes per game
FG%	Field goal percentage	3P%	3-point field goal percentage	FT%	Free throw percentage
RPG	Rebounds per game	APG	Assists per game	SPG	Steals per game
BPG	Blocks per game	PPG	Points per game	**Bold**	Career high

==== Regular season ====
Year	Team	GP	GS	MPG	FG%	3P%	FT%	RPG	APG	SPG	BPG	PPG
2002–03	Memphis	1	0	6.0	.667	–	–	1.0	0.0	0.0	0.0	4.0
