= B. J. Tyler =

American basketball player

Personal information
- Born: April 30, 1971 (age 55) Galveston, Texas, U.S.
- Listed height: 6 ft 1 in (1.85 m)
- Listed weight: 185 lb (84 kg)

Career information
- High school: Lincoln (Port Arthur, Texas)
- College: DePaul (1989–1990); Texas (1991–1994)
- NBA draft: 1994: 1st round, 20th overall pick
- Drafted by: Philadelphia 76ers
- Playing career: 1994–1995
- Position: Point guard
- Number: 1

Career history
- 1994–1995: Philadelphia 76ers

Career highlights
- Third-team All-American – AP, UPI (1994); SWC Player of the Year (1994)
- Stats at NBA.com
- Stats at Basketball Reference

Brandon Joel Tyler (born April 30, 1971) is an American former professional basketball player.

== College career ==
Tyler, a 6-foot-1-inch (185 cm) point guard, attended DePaul University for his freshman year and the University of Texas at Austin for his final three college years.

== Professional career ==
=== Philadelphia 76ers (1994–1995) ===
Tyler was taken twentieth overall in the 1994 NBA draft by the Philadelphia 76ers. He played 55 games for them in 1994-95, averaging 3.5 points and 3.2 assists per game.

Prior to the 1995-96 NBA season, Tyler was selected by the Toronto Raptors in the 1995 expansion draft. According to journalist Chris Young's book Drive, Tyler accidentally fell asleep with a pack of ice on his ankle, causing severe nerve damage. Robbed of the speed that his game was based on, he was subsequently forced to retire.

== Career statistics ==
=== NBA ===
Year	Team	GP	GS	MPG	FG%	3P%	FT%	RPG	APG	SPG	BPG	PPG
1994-95	Philadelphia	55	8	14.7	.381	.314	.700	1.1	3.2	.7	.0	3.5
Career		55	8	14.7	.381	.314	.700	1.1	3.2	.7	.0	3.5
