= List of Texas Longhorns men's basketball seasons =

This is a list of seasons completed by the Texas Longhorns men's college basketball team.

== Seasons ==
Final AP Poll (1949–present)
Final Coaches' Poll (1951–present)

Season	Coach	Overall	Conference	Standing	Postseason	Coaches' poll	AP poll
Magnus Mainland (Independent) (1905–1907)
1905–06	Magnus Mainland	7–1					
1906–07	Magnus Mainland	4–4					
Magnus Mainland:		11–5 (.688)					
W. E. Metzenthin (Independent) (1909–1911)
1908–09	W. E. Metzenthin	6–3					
1909–10	W. E. Metzenthin	6–7					
1910–11	W. E. Metzenthin	1–4					
W. E. Metzenthin:		13–14 (.481)					
J. Burton Rix (Independent) (1911–1912)
1911–12	J. Burton Rix	5–1					
J. Burton Rix:		5–1 (.833)					
Carl C. Taylor (Independent) (1912–1913)
1912–13	Carl C. Taylor	8–4					
Carl C. Taylor:		8–4 (.667)					
L. Theo Bellmont (Independent) (1913–1914)
1913–14	L. Theo Bellmont	11–0					
L. Theo Bellmont (Southwest Conference) (1914–1915)
1914–15	L. Theo Bellmont	14–0	5–0	1st			
Roy Henderson (Southwest Conference) (1915–1916)
1915–16	Roy Henderson	12–0	6–0	1st			
Eugene Van Gent (Southwest Conference) (1916–1917)
1916–17	Eugene Van Gent	13–3	7–1	1st			
Eugene Van Gent:		13–3 (.813)	7–1 (.875)				
Roy Henderson (Southwest Conference) (1917–1919)
1917–18	Roy Henderson	14–5	8–4	2nd			
1918–19	Roy Henderson	17–3	11–2	1st			
Roy Henderson:		43–8 (.843)	25–6 (.806)				
Berry M. Whitaker (Southwest Conference) (1919–1920)
1919–20	Berry M. Whitaker	10–6	4–6	3rd			
Berry M. Whitaker:		10–6 (.625)	4–6 (.400)				
L. Theo Bellmont (Southwest Conference) (1920–1922)
1920–21	L. Theo Bellmont	13–5	9–5	3rd			
1921–22	L. Theo Bellmont	20–4	14–4	2nd			
L. Theo Bellmont:		58–9 (.866)	28–9 (.757)				
Milton Romney (Southwest Conference) (1922–1923)
1922–23	Milton Romney	11–7	9–7	2nd			
Milton Romney:		11–7 (.611)	9–7 (.563)				
E. J. "Doc" Stewart (Southwest Conference) (1924–1927)
1923–24	Doc Stewart	23–0	20–0	1st			
1924–25	Doc Stewart	17–8	9–5	4th			
1925–26	Doc Stewart	12–10	6–6	4th			
1926–27	Doc Stewart	13–9	7–4	T–2nd			
E. J. "Doc" Stewart:		65–27 (.707)	42–15 (.737)				
Fred Walker (Southwest Conference) (1927–1931)
1927–28	Fred Walker	12–5	7–5	3rd			
Fred Walker:		51–30 (.630)	27–21 (.563)				
Ed Olle (Southwest Conference) (1931–1934)
1931–32	Ed Olle	13–9	5–7	4th			
1932–33	Ed Olle	22–1	11–1	1st			
1933–34	Ed Olle	14–8	6–6	3rd			
Ed Olle:		49–18 (.731)	22–14 (.611)				
Marty Karow (Southwest Conference) (1934–1936)
1934–35	Marty Karow	16–7	5–7	4th			
1935–36	Marty Karow	15–9	8–4	T–2nd			
Marty Karow:		31–16 (.660)	13–11 (.542)				
Jack Gray (Southwest Conference) (1936–1942)
1936–37	Jack Gray	13–10	5–7	T–5th			
1937–38	Jack Gray	11–11	5–7	5th			
1938–39	Jack Gray	19–6	10–2	1st	NCAA Elite Eight		
1939–40	Jack Gray	18–5	8–4	2nd			
1940–41	Jack Gray	14–10	7–5	3rd			
1941–42	Jack Gray	14–9	5–7	5th			
H. C. "Bully" Gilstrap (Southwest Conference) (1942–1945)
1942–43	Bully Gilstrap	19–7	9–3	T–1st	NCAA final Four		
1943–44	Bully Gilstrap	14–11	6–6	T–3rd			
1944–45	Bully Gilstrap	10–10	5–7	5th			
H. C. "Bully" Gilstrap:		43–28 (.606)	20–16 (.556)				
Jack Gray (Southwest Conference) (1945–1951)
1945–46	Jack Gray	16–7	7–5	3rd			
1946–47	Jack Gray	26–2	12–0	1st	NCAA final Four		
1947–48	Jack Gray	20–5	9–3	2nd	NIT Quarterfinal		
1948–49	Jack Gray	17–7	7–5	4th			
1949–50	Jack Gray	13–11	6–6	T–4th			
1950–51	Jack Gray	13–14	8–4	T–1st			
Jack Gray:		194–97 (.667)	89–55 (.618)				
Thurman "Slue" Hull (Southwest Conference) (1951–1956)
1951–52	Slue Hull	16–8	8–4	2nd			
1952–53	Slue Hull	12–9	8–4	T–2nd			
1953–54	Slue Hull	16–9	9–3	T–1st			
1954–55	Slue Hull	4–20	3–9	6th			
1955–56	Slue Hull	12–12	5–7	4th			
Thurman "Slue" Hull:		60–58 (.508)	33–27 (.550)				
Marshall Hughes (Southwest Conference) (1956–1959)
1956–57	Marshall Hughes	11–13	3–9	T–6th			
1957–58	Marshall Hughes	10–13	5–9	7th			
1958–59	Marshall Hughes	4–20	2–12	8th			
Marshall Hughes:		25–46 (.352)	10–30 (.250)				
Harold Bradley (Southwest Conference) (1959–1967)
1959–60	Harold Bradley	18–8	11–3	1st	NCAA University Division Sweet Sixteen	13	
1960–61	Harold Bradley	14–10	8–6	4th			
1961–62	Harold Bradley	16–8	8–6	4th			
1962–63	Harold Bradley	20–7	13–1	1st	NCAA University Division Sweet Sixteen	12	
1963–64	Harold Bradley	15–9	8–6	T–3rd			
1964–65	Harold Bradley	16–9	10–4	T–1st			
1965–66	Harold Bradley	12–12	7–7	4th			
1966–67	Harold Bradley	14–10	8–6	T–2nd			
Harold Bradley:		125–73 (.631)	73–39 (.652)				
Leon Black (Southwest Conference) (1967–1976)
1967–68	Leon Black	11–13	8–6	T–2nd			
1968–69	Leon Black	9–15	5–9	T–6th			
1969–70	Leon Black	11–13	6–8	6th			
1970–71	Leon Black	12–12	6–8	T–5th			
1971–72	Leon Black	19–9	10–4	T–1st	NCAA University Division Sweet Sixteen		
1972–73	Leon Black	13–12	7–7	T–5th			
1973–74	Leon Black	12–15	11–3	1st	NCAA Division I first round		
1974–75	Leon Black	10–15	6–8	T–4th			
1975–76	Leon Black	9–17	4–12	8th			
Leon Black:		106–121 (.467)	63–65 (.492)				
A.E. "Abe" Lemons (Southwest Conference) (1976–1982)
1976–77	Abe Lemons	13–13	8–8	4th			
1977–78	Abe Lemons	26–5	14–2	T–1st	NIT champion	19	17
1978–79	Abe Lemons	21–8	13–3	T–1st	NCAA Division I second round	15	
1979–80	Abe Lemons	19–11	10–6	3rd	NIT second round		
1980–81	Abe Lemons	15–15	7–9	T–6th			
1981–82	Abe Lemons	16–11	6–10	T–7th			
A.E. "Abe" Lemons:		110–63 (.636)	58–38 (.604)				
Bob Weltlich (Southwest Conference) (1982–1988)
1982–83	Bob Weltlich	6–22	1–15	9th			
1983–84	Bob Weltlich	7–21	3–13	8th			
1984–85	Bob Weltlich	15–13	7–9	7th			
1985–86	Bob Weltlich	19–12	12–4	T–1st	NIT second round		
1986–87	Bob Weltlich	14–17	7–9	T–6th			
1987–88	Bob Weltlich	16–13	10–6	T–4th			
Bob Weltlich:		77–98 (.440)	40–56 (.417)				
Tom Penders (Southwest Conference) (1988–1996)
1988–89	Tom Penders	25–6	12–4	2nd	NCAA Division I second round		
1989–90	Tom Penders	24–9	12–4	3rd	NCAA Division I Elite Eight	12	
1990–91	Tom Penders	23–9	13–3	2nd	NCAA Division I second round		23
1991–92	Tom Penders	23–12	11–3	T–1st	NCAA Division I first round		
1992–93	Tom Penders	11–17	4–10	7th			
1993–94	Tom Penders	26–8	12–2	1st	NCAA Division I second round	24	20
1994–95	Tom Penders	23–7	11–3	T–1st	NCAA Division I second round	24	
1995–96	Tom Penders	21–10	10–4	3rd	NCAA Division I second round		
Tom Penders (Big 12 Conference) (1996–1998)
1996–97	Tom Penders	18–12	10–6	T–3rd	NCAA Division I Sweet Sixteen	20	
1997–98	Tom Penders	14–17	6–10	10th			
Tom Penders:		208–107 (.660)	85–33 (.720)				
Rick Barnes (Big 12 Conference) (1998–2015)
1998–99	Rick Barnes	19–13	13–3	1st	NCAA Division I first round		
1999–2000	Rick Barnes	24–9	13–3	2nd	NCAA Division I second round	21	15
2000–01	Rick Barnes	25–9	12–4	T–2nd	NCAA Division I first round		18
2001–02	Rick Barnes	22–12	10–6	T–3rd	NCAA Division I Sweet Sixteen	18	
2002–03	Rick Barnes	26–7	13–3	2nd	NCAA Division I Final Four	3	5
2003–04	Rick Barnes	25–8	12–4	T–2nd	NCAA Division I Sweet Sixteen	10	12
2004–05	Rick Barnes	20–11	9–7	T–5th	NCAA Division I first round		
2005–06	Rick Barnes	30–7	13–3	T–1st	NCAA Division I Elite Eight	9	9
2006–07	Rick Barnes	25–10	12–4	3rd	NCAA Division I second round	16	11
2007–08	Rick Barnes	31–7	13–3	T–1st	NCAA Division I Elite Eight	5	7
2008–09	Rick Barnes	23–12	9–7	T–4th	NCAA Division I second round	23	
2009–10	Rick Barnes	24–10	9–7	T–6th	NCAA Division I first round		
2010–11	Rick Barnes	28–8	13–3	2nd	NCAA Division I second round	16	8
2011–12	Rick Barnes	20–14	9–9	6th	NCAA Division I first round		
2012–13	Rick Barnes	16–18	7–11	7th	CBI first round		
2013–14	Rick Barnes	24–11	11–7	T–3rd	NCAA Division I second round		
2014–15	Rick Barnes	20–14	8–10	T–6th	NCAA Division I first round		
Rick Barnes:		402–180 (.691)	186–94 (.664)				
Shaka Smart (Big 12 Conference) (2015–2021)
2015–16	Shaka Smart	20–13	11–7	4th	NCAA Division I first round		
2016–17	Shaka Smart	11–22	4–14	10th			
2017–18	Shaka Smart	19–15	8–10	T–6th	NCAA Division I first round		
2018–19	Shaka Smart	21–16	8–10	6th	NIT champion		
2019–20	Shaka Smart	19–12	9–9	T–3rd	No postseason held		
2020–21	Shaka Smart	19–8	11–6	3rd	NCAA Division I first round	9	21
Shaka Smart:		109–86 (.559)	51–56 (.477)				
Chris Beard (Big 12 Conference) (2021–2023)
2021–22	Chris Beard	22–12	10–8	4th	NCAA Division I second round	25	
2022–23	Chris Beard	7–1				7	8
Chris Beard:		29–13 (.690)	10–8 (.556)				
Rodney Terry (Big 12 Conference) (2022–2024)
2022–23	Rodney Terry	22–8	12–6	2nd	NCAA Division I Elite Eight	5	7
2023–24	Rodney Terry	21–13	9–9	T–7th	NCAA Division I second round		
Rodney Terry (Southeastern Conference) (2024–2025)
2024–25	Rodney Terry	19–16	6–12	T–13th	NCAA Division I first four		
Rodney Terry:		62–37 (.626)	27–27 (.500)				
Total:		1907–1143 (.625)	SWC: 648–449 (.591); Big 12: 284–187 (.603); SEC: 6–12 (.333)				
National champion Postseason invitational champion Conference regular season champion Conference regular season and conference tournament champion Division regular season champion Division regular season and conference tournament champion Conference tournament champion
