= List of Texas Longhorns men's basketball coaches =

The Texas Longhorns men's basketball program is a college basketball team that represents the University of Texas in the Southeastern Conference in the National Collegiate Athletic Association. The team has seen 25 individuals hold the head coach position since its inception in 1906.

The current head coach is Sean Miller. Previously the head coach was Rodney Terry, who was named interim head coach when Chris Beard was suspended in December 2022 after being arrested on a domestic violence charge. Beard was fired in January 2023. On March 27, 2023, Terry agreed to a deal to become Texas's full-time Head Coach.

Over the history of the Texas basketball program, only one coach, Tom Penders, has been enshrined in the National Collegiate Basketball Hall of Fame. The all-time wins leader is Rick Barnes, having won 402 games over his 17-year tenure at the University of Texas.

== Key ==
General
#	Number of coaches (Note: A running total of the number of head coaches.)
**GC**	Games coached
†	Elected to the National Collegiate Basketball Hall of Fame

Overall
**OW**	Wins
**OL**	Losses
**O%**	Winning percentage

Conference (Note: The Longhorns played as part of the Southern Intercollegiate Athletic Association from their first years until joining the Texas Intercollegiate Athletic Association in 1907. Texas led the creation of the Southwest Conference in 1915, which became the Big 12 Conference after a merger in 1997.)
**CW**	Wins
**CL**	Losses
**C%**	Winning percentage

NCAA Tournament (Note: Postseason play involving the NCAA Division I men's basketball tournament.)
**TA**	Total appearances (Note: NCAA Division I men's basketball tournament appearances since the tournament began in 1939.)
**TW**	Total wins
**TL**	Total losses

Championships
**NC**	National championships
**CC**	Conference regular season
**CT**	Conference tournaments

Bold = leader in each category

== Coaches ==
List of head basketball coaches showing season(s) coached, overall records, conference records, NCAA Tournament records, championships and selected awards.*Statistics correct as of March 3, 2025.
#	Name	Term	GC	OW	OL	O%	CW	CL	C%	TA	TW	TL	CCs	CTs	NCs
1	Magnus Mainland	1906–1907	16	11	5	.688	—	—	—	—	—	—	—	—	—
2	W. E. Metzenthin	1909–1911	27	13	14	.481	—	—	—	—	—	—	—	—	—
3	J. Burton Rix	1912	6	5	1	.833	—	—	—	—	—	—	—	—	—
4	Carl C. Taylor	1913	12	8	4	.667	—	—	—	—	—	—	—	—	—
5	L. Theo Bellmont	1914–1915, 1921–1922	67	58	9	**.866**	28	9	.757	—	—	—	1	—	—
6	Roy Henderson	1916, 1918–1919	51	43	8	.843	25	6	.806	—	—	—	2	—	—
7	Eugene Van Gent	1917	16	13	3	.813	7	1	.875	—	—	—	1	—	—
8	Berry Whitaker	1920	16	10	6	.625	4	6	.400	—	—	—	—	—	—
9	Milton Romney	1923	18	11	7	.611	9	7	.563	—	—	—	—	—	—
10	E. J. Stewart	1924–1927	92	65	27	.707	42	15	.737	—	—	—	1	—	—
11	Fred Walker	1927–1931	81	51	30	.630	27	21	.563	—	—	—	—	—	—
12	Ed Olle	1931–1934	67	49	18	.731	22	14	.611	—	—	—	1	—	—
13	Marty Karow	1934–1936	47	31	16	.660	13	11	.542	—	—	—	—	—	—
14	Jack Gray	1936–1942, 1945–1951	291	194	97	.667	89	55	.618	2	2	3	**3**	—	—
15	Bully Gilstrap	1942–1945	71	43	28	.606	20	16	.556	1	1	1	1	—	—
16	Thurman Hull	1951–1956	118	60	58	.508	33	27	.550	—	—	—	1	—	—
17	Marshall Hughes	1956–1959	71	25	46	.352	10	30	.250	—	—	—	—	—	—
18	Harold Bradley	1959–1967	198	125	73	.631	73	39	.652	2	2	3	**3**	—	—
19	Leon Black	1967–1976	227	106	121	.467	63	65	.492	2	1	2	2	—	—
20	Abe Lemons	1976–1982	173	110	63	.636	58	38	.604	1	0	1	2	—	—
21	Bob Weltlich	1982–1988	175	77	98	.440	40	56	.417	—	—	—	1	—	—
22	Tom Penders†	1988–1998	318	208	110	.654	101	49	.673	8	10	8	**3**	**2**	—
23	Rick Barnes	**1998–2015**	**582**	**402**	**180**	.691	**186**	**94**	.664	**16**	**19**	**16**	**3**	—	—
24	Shaka Smart	2015–2021	195	109	86	.559	51	56	.477	3	0	3	—	1	—
25	Chris Beard	2021–2022	42	29	13	.690	10	8	.556	1	1	1	—	—	—
26	Rodney Terry	2022–2025	99	62	37	.626	27	27	.500	3	4	3	—	1	—
27	Sean Miller	2025–present	36	21	15	.583	9	9	.500	4	3	1	—	—	—

NCAA Tournament
	Coach	Appearances
Final Four	Bully Gilstrap	1
Final Four	Jack Gray	1
Final Four	Rick Barnes	1
Elite Eight	Rick Barnes	3
Elite Eight	Jack Gray	2
Elite Eight	Rodney Terry	1
Elite Eight	Tom Penders	1
Sweet Sixteen	Rick Barnes	5
Sweet Sixteen	Harold Bradley	2
Sweet Sixteen	Tom Penders	2
Sweet Sixteen	Rodney Terry	1
Sweet Sixteen	Leon Black	1
Sweet Sixteen	Sean Miller	1
