= 1930–31 Baylor Bears basketball team =

American college basketball season

1930–31 Baylor Bears men's basketball
- Conference: Southwest Conference
- Record: 12-8 (7-5 SWC)
- Head coach: Ralph Wolf

1930–31 Southwest Conference men's basketball standings
	Conf.				Overall
Team	W		L	PCT	W		L	PCT
TCU	9	–	3	.750	18	–	4	.818
SMU	8	–	4	.667	9	–	8	.529
Arkansas	7	–	5	.583	14	–	9	.609
Baylor	7	–	5	.583	12	–	8	.600
Texas A&M	5	–	7	.417	14	–	8	.636
Rice	4	–	8	.333	8	–	9	.471
Texas	2	–	10	.167	9	–	15	.375

The 1930-31 Baylor Bears basketball team represented the Baylor University during the 1930-31 college men's basketball season.

== Schedule ==
Date time, TV	Opponent	Result	Record	Site city, state
*	Central State	W 46-27	1-0	Waco, TX
*	Central State	W 41-28	2-0	Waco, TX
*	Cameron	W 42-41	3-0	Waco, TX
*	West Texas State	L 36-62	3-1	Waco, TX
*	West Texas State	L 35-45	3-2	Waco, TX
*	Hardin–Simmons	W 31-27	4-2	Waco, TX
	Rice	L 33-37	4-3	Waco, TX
	at SMU	L 37-47	4-4	Dallas, TX
	at Texas	W 45-43	5-4	Austin, TX
	Rice	W 53-40	6-4	Waco, TX
	at Texas A&M	L 12-36	6-5	College Station, TX
	TCU	L 22-38	6-6	Waco, TX
	Texas A&M	W 27-18	7-6	Waco, TX
	at Arkansas	W 29-27	8-6	Fayetteville, AR
	at Arkansas	L 25-29	8-7	Fayetteville, AR
	SMU	W 34-28	9-7	Waco, TX
	Texas	W 34-21	10-7	Waco, TX
	at TCU	W 36-34	11-7	Fort Worth, TX
*	Stephen F. Austin	W 39-27	12-7	Waco, TX
*	Stephen F. Austin	L 34-38	12-8	Waco, TX
*Non-conference game. (#) Tournament seedings in parentheses.
