= Moers (surname) =

Moers is a surname. Notable people with the surname include:

- Bobby Moers (1918–1986), American college basketball, baseball, and football player
- Ellen Moers (1928–1978), American academic and literary scholar
- Tobias Moers (born 1966), German businessman
- Walter Moers (born 1957), German comic creator and author
