= Bobby Moers =

American athlete (1918–1986)

Personal information
- Born: August 9, 1918
- Died: September 1, 1986 (aged 68)

Robert Moers (August 9, 1918 – September 1, 1986) was a college basketball, baseball, and football player for The University of Texas at Austin.

Known for his outstanding dribbling skills, Moers was a three-year letterman under Texas basketball head coach Jack Gray from 1938 to 1940. Moers received recognition as a two-time all-Southwest Conference and two-time first-team All-American point guard in 1939 and 1940. He was the first Longhorn basketball player to win All-America honors in more than one season. Moers helped to lead the 1939 Longhorns to an outright Southwest Conference championship—Texas's first conference title since Ed Olle's 22–1 team of 1932–33—and to the first-ever edition of the NCAA Tournament, where Texas fell 56–41 to the eventual national champion Oregon Webfoots (later known as the Ducks) in the Elite Eight round. In his senior season, he would help lead Texas to an 18–5 overall record and a retroactive national ranking of No. 17 in the Premo-Porretta Power Poll. Moers was also a three-time all-Southwest Conference third baseman in baseball for the Longhorns from 1938 to 1940.

Moers entered medical school after graduating from UT and would become a highly successful Houston physician. He was inducted into the UT Men's Hall of Honor in 1964 and was later named to the UT All-Decade Team of the 1930s in basketball. In 1975, the Southwest Conference named Moers as one of five members of its "UT All-Time Team."
