= 1934–35 Baylor Bears basketball team =

American college basketball season

1934–35 Baylor Bears men's basketball
- Conference: Southwest Conference
- Record: 9–9 (4–8 SWC)
- Head coach: Ralph Wolf

1934–35 Southwest Conference men's basketball standings
	Conf.				Overall
Team	W		L	PCT	W		L	PCT
Rice	9	–	3	.750	20	–	3	.870
SMU	9	–	3	.750	14	–	3	.824
Arkansas	9	–	3	.750	14	–	5	.737
Texas	5	–	7	.417	16	–	7	.696
Texas A&M	4	–	8	.333	10	–	10	.500
Baylor	4	–	8	.333	8	–	9	.471
TCU	2	–	10	.167	6	–	13	.316

The 1934-35 Baylor Bears basketball team represented the Baylor University during the 1934-35 college men's basketball season.

== Schedule ==
Date time, TV	Opponent	Result	Record	Site city, state
*	Walkers D.C.	W 40-21	1-0	Waco, TX
*	Jasper A.S.	W 40-20	2-0	Waco, TX
*	Jasper A.S.	W 36-28	3-0	Waco, TX
*	Jasper A.S.	W 42-32	4-0	Waco, TX
	SMU	W 27-26	5-0	Waco, TX
	at Texas	L 23-44	5-1	Austin, TX
	Texas A&M	L 26-45	5-2	Waco, TX
	at Texas A&M	W 33-29	6-2	College Station, TX
	at Rice	L 31-43	6-3	Houston, TX
*	SAM Houston State	W 42-30	7-3	Waco, TX
*	at Stephen F. Austin	L 32-36	7-4	Nacogdoches, TX
	TCU	L 20-25	7-5	Waco, TX
	at Arkansas	L 32-48	7-6	Fayetteville, AR
	at Arkansas	L 36-44	7-7	Fayetteville, AR
	at TCU	W 30-25	8-7	Fort Worth, TX
	Texas	W 45-23	9-7	Waco, TX
	at SMU	L 23-40	9-8	Dallas, TX
	Rice	L 34-35	9-9	Waco, TX
*Non-conference game. (#) Tournament seedings in parentheses.
