= 1936–37 Baylor Bears basketball team =

American college basketball season

1936–37 Baylor Bears men's basketball
- Conference: Southwest Conference
- Record: 10-10 (6–6 SWC)
- Head coach: Ralph Wolf

1936–37 Southwest Conference men's basketball standings
	Conf.				Overall
Team	W		L	PCT	W		L	PCT
SMU	10	–	2	.833	13	–	8	.619
Arkansas	8	–	4	.667	12	–	6	.667
Rice	7	–	5	.583	6	–	10	.375
Baylor	6	–	6	.500	11	–	9	.550
Texas	5	–	7	.417	13	–	10	.565
Texas A&M	5	–	7	.417	12	–	13	.480
TCU	1	–	11	.083	1	–	13	.071

The 1936-37 Baylor Bears basketball team represented the Baylor University during the 1936-37 college men's basketball season.

== Schedule ==
Date time, TV	Opponent	Result	Record	Site city, state
*	Hardin–Simmons	L 16-37	0-1	Waco, TX
*	Hardin-Simmons	L 6-25	0-2	Waco, TX
*	Daniel Baker	W 29-28	1-2	Waco, TX
*	Daniel Baker	W 37-16	2-2	Waco, TX
*	Southwestern Oklahoma State	W 42-16	3-2	Waco, TX
*	Central State	W 56-54	4-2	Waco, TX
*	Tulsa	L 23-26	4-3	Waco, TX
*	Texas Tech	L 28-38	4-4	Waco, TX
	at Arkansas	L 46-48	4-5	Fayetteville, AR
	at Arkansas	L 47-54	4-6	Fayetteville, AR
	Texas A&M	L 33-37	4-7	Waco, TX
	Rice	W 27-19	5-7	Waco, TX
	Texas A&M	L 19-21	5-8	Waco, TX
	TCU	W 21-19	6-8	Waco, TX
	at SMU	W 26-15	7-8	Dallas, TX
	Texas	W 33-31	8-8	Waco, TX
	SMU	L 20-25	8-9	Waco, TX
	at TCU	W 36-35	9-9	Fort Worth, TX
	at Texas	W 40-39	10-9	Austin, TX
	at Rice	L 36-40	10-10	Houston, TX
*Non-conference game. (#) Tournament seedings in parentheses.
