= 1935–36 Baylor Bears basketball team =

American college basketball season

1935–36 Baylor Bears men's basketball
- Conference: Southwest Conference
- Record: 11-14 (5-7 SWC)
- Head coach: Ralph Wolf

1935–36 Southwest Conference men's basketball standings
| | Conf. | | | | Overall |
| Team | W | | L | PCT | W | | L | PCT |
|---|---|---|---|---|---|---|---|---|
| Arkansas | 11 | – | 1 | .917 | 24 | – | 3 | .889 |
| Texas | 8 | – | 4 | .667 | 15 | – | 9 | .625 |
| Rice | 8 | – | 4 | .667 | 12 | – | 10 | .545 |
| Baylor | 6 | – | 6 | .500 | 12 | – | 13 | .480 |
| SMU | 4 | – | 8 | .333 | 4 | – | 8 | .333 |
| Texas A&M | 3 | – | 9 | .250 | 9 | – | 9 | .500 |
| TCU | 2 | – | 10 | .167 | 3 | – | 11 | .214 |

The 1935-36 Baylor Bears basketball team represented the Baylor University during the 1935-36 college men's basketball season.

== Schedule ==
| Date time, TV | Opponent | Result | Record | Site city, state |
|---|---|---|---|---|
| * | Sam Houston State | W 40-22 | 1-0 | Waco, TX |
| * | at Stephen F. Austin | L 29-40 | 1-1 | Nacogdoches, TX |
| * | at Stephen F. Austin | L 42-44 | 1-2 | Nacogdoches, TX |
| * | Central State | L 27-35 | 1-3 | Waco, TX |
| * | Central State | L 25-43 | 1-4 | Waco, TX |
| * | SE Oklahoma State | W 22-19 | 2-4 | Waco, TX |
| * | Central Missouri State | L 24-32 | 2-5 | Waco, TX |
| * | Phillips | W 41-33 | 3-5 | Waco, TX |
| * | Kansas | W 42-30 | 4-5 | Waco, TX |
| * | Southwestern | L 24-25 | 4-6 | Waco, TX |
| * | Beaumont YMCA | W 35-23 | 5-6 | Waco, TX |
| * | East Central | W 36-34 | 6-6 | Waco, TX |
| * | East Central | L 26-30 | 6-7 | Waco, TX |
| | Rice | L 33-35 | 6-8 | Waco, TX |
| | at Texas A&M | W 42-28 | 7-8 | College Station, TX |
| | Arkansas | L 26-44 | 7-9 | Waco, TX |
| | Arkansas | L 14-39 | 7-10 | Waco, TX |
| | Texas | L 23-24 | 7-11 | Waco, TX |
| | at Texas | L 24-30 | 7-12 | Austin, TX |
| | Texas A&M | W 27-13 | 8-12 | Waco, TX |
| | TCU | W 41-24 | 9-12 | Waco, TX |
| | at Rice | L 23-32 | 9-13 | Houston, TX |
| | SMU | W 30-28 | 10-13 | Waco, TX |
| | at SMU | L 20-27 | 10-14 | Dallas, TX |
| | at TCU | W 35-27 | 11-14 | Fort Worth, TX |
*Non-conference game. (#) Tournament seedings in parentheses.
