= 1933–34 Baylor Bears basketball team =

American college basketball season

1933–34 Baylor Bears men's basketball
- Conference: Southwest Conference
- Record: 8–10 (2–10 SWC)
- Head coach: Ralph Wolf

1933–34 Southwest Conference men's basketball standings
	Conf.				Overall
Team	W		L	PCT	W		L	PCT
TCU	10	–	2	.833	13	–	2	.867
Texas A&M	7	–	5	.583	14	–	6	.700
Arkansas	6	–	6	.500	16	–	8	.667
Texas	6	–	6	.500	14	–	8	.636
Rice	6	–	6	.500	6	–	6	.500
SMU	5	–	7	.417	6	–	9	.400
Baylor	2	–	10	.167	8	–	10	.444

The 1933-34 Baylor Bears basketball team represented the Baylor University during the 1933-34 college men's basketball season.

== Schedule ==
Date time, TV	Opponent	Result	Record	Site city, state
*	Sam Houston State	L 28-36	0-1	Waco, TX
*	at Stephen F. Austin	W 40-30	1-1	Nacogdoches, TX
*	Humble Oil	W 42-33	2-1	Waco, TX
*	Humble Oil	W 30-26	3-1	Waco, TX
*	East Texas State	W 36-28	4-1	Waco, TX
	SMU	L 25-35	4-2	Waco, TX
	Texas	L 35-44	4-3	Waco, TX
*	at Southeastern Oklahoma State	W 36-28	5-3	Waco, TX
	Rice	L 30-45	5-4	Waco, TX
	at Texas A&M	L 14-30	5-5	College Station, TX
	Arkansas	L 29-31	5-6	Waco, TX
	Arkansas	W 31-20	6-6	Waco, TX
	TCU	L 24-31	6-7	Waco, TX
	at SMU	L 32-37	6-8	Dallas, TX
	Texas	W 39-30	7-8	Waco, TX
	at TCU	L 32-39	7-9	Fort Worth, TX
	Texas A&M	L 32-34	7-10	Waco, TX
	at Rice	L 28-39	7-11	Houston, TX
*Non-conference game. (#) Tournament seedings in parentheses.
