= 1932–33 Baylor Bears basketball team =

American college basketball season

1932–33 Baylor Bears men's basketball
- Conference: Southwest Conference
- Record: 4–13 (1–11 SWC)
- Head coach: Ralph Wolf

1932–33 Southwest Conference men's basketball standings
	Conf.				Overall
Team	W		L	PCT	W		L	PCT
Texas	11	–	1	.917	22	–	1	.957
TCU	9	–	3	.750	16	–	4	.800
Texas A&M	8	–	4	.667	9	–	10	.474
Arkansas	6	–	6	.500	14	–	7	.667
SMU	5	–	7	.417	9	–	9	.500
Rice	2	–	10	.167	8	–	10	.444
Baylor	1	–	11	.083	4	–	13	.235

The 1932-33 Baylor Bears basketball team represented the Baylor University during the 1932-33 college men's basketball season.

== Schedule ==
Date time, TV	Opponent	Result	Record	Site city, state
*	Randolph AFB	W 38-29	1-0	Waco, TX
*	at LSU	L 28-40	1-1	Baton Rouge, LA
*	at Louisiana Tech	L 30-42	1-2	Ruston, LA
*	at Stephen F. Austin	W 36-30	2-2	Nacogdoches, TX
*	East Texas State	W 40-20	3-2	Waco, TX
	at Texas	L 26-48	3-3	Austin, TX
	at Rice	L 28-45	3-4	Houston, TX
	TCU	L 22-31	3-5	Waco, TX
	Texas A&M	L 19-20	3-6	Waco, TX
	at Texas A&M	L 29-33	3-7	College Station, TX
	Texas	L 28-33	3-8	Waco, TX
	SMU	L 20-27	3-9	Waco, TX
	at SMU	W 29-27	4-9	Dallas, TX
	Rice	L 35-39	4-10	Waco, TX
	at Arkansas	L 19-34	4-11	Fayetteville, AR
	at Arkansas	L 20-39	4-12	Fayetteville, AR
	at TCU	L 22-51	4-13	Fort Worth, TX
*Non-conference game. (#) Tournament seedings in parentheses.
