= 1938–39 Baylor Bears basketball team =

American college basketball season

1938–39 Baylor Bears men's basketball
- Conference: Southwest Conference
- Record: 15-6 (7–5 SWC)
- Head coach: Ralph Wolf

1938–39 Southwest Conference men's basketball standings
	Conf.				Overall
Team	W		L	PCT	W		L	PCT
Texas	10	–	2	.833	19	–	6	.760
Arkansas	9	–	3	.750	18	–	5	.783
SMU	8	–	4	.667	14	–	8	.636
Baylor	7	–	5	.583	14	–	7	.667
Rice	6	–	6	.500	10	–	11	.476
Texas A&M	2	–	10	.167	7	–	16	.304
TCU	0	–	12	.000	2	–	17	.105

The 1938-39 Baylor Bears basketball team represented the Baylor University during the 1938-39 college men's basketball season.

== Schedule ==
Date time, TV	Opponent	Result	Record	Site city, state
*	Central State	W 37-29	1-0	Waco, TX
*	Central State	W 41-39	2-0	Waco, TX
*	Southwestern Oklahoma State	W 45-38	3-0	Waco, TX
*	Southwestern Oklahoma State	W 53-26	4-0	Waco, TX
*	Arizona State	W 44-31	5-0	Oklahoma City, OK
*	Oklahoma City	W 35-29	6-0	Oklahoma City, OK
*	Maryville	W 29-28	7-0	Oklahoma City, OK
*	Texas	L 38-46	7-1	Oklahoma City, OK
*	Oklahoma A&M	W 30-28	8-1	Waco, TX
	TCU	W 62-28	9-1	Waco, TX
	at Texas A&M	W 38-34	10-1	College Station, TX
	Texas	L 31-36	10-2	Waco, TX
	at TCU	W 35-31	11-2	Fort Worth, TX
	at Rice	W 44-42	12-2	Houston, TX
	at Arkansas	L 38-46	12-3	Fayetteville, AR
	at Arkansas	L 36-40	12-4	Fayetteville, AR
	SMU	W 60-35	13-4	Waco, TX
	Texas A&M	W 47-23	14-4	Waco, TX
	at Texas	L 39-41	14-5	Austin, TX
	Rice	W 63-40	15-5	Waco, TX
	at SMU	L 33-39	15-6	Dallas, TX
*Non-conference game. (#) Tournament seedings in parentheses.
