= 1929–30 Baylor Bears basketball team =

American college basketball season

1929–30 Baylor Bears men's basketball
- Conference: Southwest Conference
- Record: 10-6 (4-6 SWC)
- Head coach: Ralph Wolf

1929–30 Southwest Conference men's basketball standings
	Conf.				Overall
Team	W		L	PCT	W		L	PCT
Arkansas	10	–	2	.833	16	–	7	.696
Texas	8	–	4	.667	12	–	8	.600
SMU	6	–	6	.500	8	–	10	.444
Baylor	4	–	6	.400	10	–	6	.625
Texas A&M	4	–	6	.400	8	–	10	.444
Rice	4	–	8	.333	7	–	9	.438
TCU	4	–	8	.333	7	–	10	.412

The 1929-30 Baylor Bears basketball team represented the Baylor University during the 1929-30 college men's basketball season.

== Schedule ==
Date time, TV	Opponent	Result	Record	Site city, state
*	Shreveport YMCA	W 50-21	1-0	Waco, TX
*	Shreveport YMCA	W 57-20	2-0	Waco, TX
*	NEW Orleans Athletic Club	W 30-25	3-0	Waco, TX
*	NEW Orleans Athletic Club	W 44-31	4-0	Waco, TX
	Texas	L 32-35	4-1	Waco, TX
*	Trinity	W 64-20	5-1	Waco, TX
*	Trinity	W 48-20	6-1	Waco, TX
	SMU	W 32-24	7-1	Waco, TX
	at Texas	L 24-42	7-2	Austin, TX
	Arkansas	L 23-30	7-3	Waco, TX
	Arkansas	L 21-27	7-4	Waco, TX
	at TCU	L 22-33	7-5	Fort Worth, TX
	TCU	W 34-20	8-5	Waco, TX
	Rice	W 35-27	9-5	Waco, TX
	at SMU	L 24-26	9-6	Dallas, TX
	Rice	W 41-37	10-6	Waco, TX
*Non-conference game. (#) Tournament seedings in parentheses.
