= Magnus Mainland =

Scottish football and basketball player

Mangus Mainland
Biographical details
- Born: November 9, 1879; Wyre, Scotland
- Died: September 4, 1959 (aged 79); Santa Barbara, California, US
- Education: Wheaton College; University of Texas

Playing career

Basketball
- ?-1904: Wheaton College
- 1906-1907: Texas

Football
- ?: Texas

Coaching career (HC unless noted)
- 1906-1907: Texas

Head coaching record
- Overall: 11–5

Magnus Mainland (November 9, 1879 – September 4, 1959) was a college football lineman and college basketball player and founding basketball coach for The University of Texas at Austin.

== Early life ==
Mainland was born on the island of Wyre, one of the Orkney Islands, in Scotland in 1879. He was raised until he turned 18 when he moved to the United States and settled in or near Racine, Wisconsin, an area that became home to many Orkney natives in the late 19th and early 20th centuries.

== Career ==
Mainland was a nationally known basketball player as an undergraduate student at Wheaton College (Illinois). His Wheaton team was able to compete in the college basketball competition in the 1904 Summer Olympics in St. Louis, the first Olympic Games featuring the young sport (although only as a demonstration sport). Wheaton placed second out of the three competing college basketball teams.

Following his graduation from Wheaton, Mainland enrolled in engineering courses at The University of Texas. While a student there, he was able to convince University officials to permit him to organize, coach, and play on the university's first varsity basketball team. The Longhorns took the court for the first time on March 10, 1906, defeating the Baylor Bears 27–17 at outdoor Clark Field. Texas won seven of the eight games scheduled in its inaugural season. Mainland's second and final season as head coach resulted in a 4–4 overall record.

Due to inadequate funding, the University Athletics Council canceled the basketball program after two seasons, leaving Texas without a basketball team for 1908. The program was reinstated in 1909 under the direction of UT German studies faculty member and previous Longhorn football head coach (1907–08) W. E. Metzenthin, who had supported students in their efforts to have the program revived.

Mainland also lettered in Football in 1905–06.

== Personal life and death ==
He married Mina Belle Beach on 23 December 1907, in Cochise, Arizona. He worked as a merchant in both the plumbing and sheet metal industries, and lived for the rest of his life in Arizona and California. He died in 1959 in Santa Barbara, California.

== Head coaching record ==
Record table
| Season | Team | Overall | Conference | Standing | Postseason |
|---|---|---|---|---|---|
Texas (Independent) (1906–1907)
| 1906 | Texas | 7–1 | | | |
| 1907 | Texas | 4–4 | | | |
| Texas: | | 11–5 (.688) | | | |
| Total: | | 11–5 (.688) | | | |
