= 1937–38 Baylor Bears basketball team =

American college basketball season

1937–38 Baylor Bears men's basketball
- Conference: Southwest Conference
- Record: 10–6 (9–3 SWC)
- Head coach: Ralph Wolf

1937–38 Southwest Conference men's basketball standings
	Conf.				Overall
Team	W		L	PCT	W		L	PCT
Arkansas	11	–	1	.917	19	–	3	.864
Baylor	9	–	3	.750	10	–	6	.625
SMU	8	–	4	.667	9	–	6	.600
Texas A&M	6	–	6	.500	10	–	8	.556
Texas	5	–	7	.417	11	–	11	.500
Rice	2	–	10	.167	6	–	17	.261
TCU	1	–	11	.083	8	–	15	.348

The 1937-38 Baylor Bears basketball team represented the Baylor University during the 1937-38 college men's basketball season.

== Schedule ==
Date time, TV	Opponent	Result	Record	Site city, state
*	Phillips	W 39-20	1-0	Waco, TX
*	Oklahoma A&M	L 24-38	1-1	Waco, TX
*	Tulsa	L 21-27	1-2	Waco, TX
	at Rice	L 30-44	1-3	Houston, TX
	SMU	W 26-23	2-3	Waco, TX
	at Texas	W 51-45	3-3	Austin, TX
	Texas A&M	W 36-28	4-3	Waco, TX
	at TCU	W 66-39	5-3	Fort Worth, TX
	Texas	W 46-45	6-3	Waco, TX
	at Texas A&M	L 46-48	6-4	College Station, TX
	Arkansas	L 45-54	6-5	Waco, TX
	Arkansas	W 54-47	7-5	Waco, TX
	TCU	W 43-37	8-5	Waco, TX
	at Rice	W 47-45	9-5	Houston, TX
	Rice	W 54-44	10-5	Waco, TX
	at SMU	L 36-45	10-6	Dallas, TX
*Non-conference game. (#) Tournament seedings in parentheses.
