= 1938–39 Texas Longhorns men's basketball team =

American college basketball season

1938–39 Texas Longhorns men's basketball

Southwest Conference Champions

NCAA Tournament, Elite Eight
- Conference: Southwest Conference
- Record: 19–6 (10–2 SWC)
- Head coach: Jack Gray (3rd season)

The 1938–39 Texas Longhorns men's basketball team represented The University of Texas at Austin in intercollegiate basketball competition during the 1938–39 season. The Longhorns were led by third-year head coach and former Longhorn basketball consensus first-team All-American Jack Gray. The team finished the season with a 19–6 overall record and a 10–2 record in Southwest Conference play to win the SWC championship. Texas advanced to the inaugural postseason NCAA tournament, recording its first Elite Eight appearance.

== Schedule and results ==
Coach: Jack Gray; Overall record: 19–6; Southwest Conference record: 10–2; Southwest Conference standing: 1st
Date	Opponent	Site	Result	Record
Regular season
Dec 3	Kilgore Pipeliners	Gregory Gymnasium • Austin, Texas	W 37–27	1–0
Dec 7	at Southwest Texas State	? • San Marcos, Texas	W 57–31	2–0
Dec 10	Southwest Texas State	Gregory Gymnasium • Austin, Texas	W 45–31	3–0
Dec 16	Kansas	Gregory Gymnasium • Austin, Texas	W 36–34	4–0
Dec 17	Kansas	Gregory Gymnasium • Austin, Texas	L 35–49	4–1
Dec 26	vs. Southeastern State (Ok.)	? • Oklahoma City, Oklahoma	W 41–25	5–1
Dec 27	vs. Westminster (Mo.)	? • Oklahoma City, Oklahoma	W 35–24	6–1
Dec 28	vs. Kansas State Teachers College	? • Oklahoma City, Oklahoma	W 34–27	7–1
Dec 29	vs. Baylor	? • Oklahoma City, Oklahoma	W 46–38	8–1
Dec 30	vs. Central Missouri State Teachers College	? • Oklahoma City, Oklahoma	L 25–33	8–2
Jan 7	at Rice*	? • Houston, Texas	L 41–45	8–3 (0–1 SWC)
Jan 13	Arkansas	Gregory Gymnasium • Austin, Texas	W 41–37	9–3 (1–1)
Jan 14	Arkansas	Gregory Gymnasium • Austin, Texas	L 41–65	9–4(1–2)
Jan 18	at Baylor*	? • Waco, Texas	W 36–31	10–4 (2–2)
Jan 31	St. Edward's	Gregory Gymnasium • Austin, Texas	W 47–32	11–4
Feb 6	at SMU*	? • Dallas, Texas	W 33–27	12–4 (3–2)
Feb 7	at TCU*	? • Fort Worth, Texas	W 32–28	13–4 (4–2)
Feb 11	at Texas A&M*	? • College Station, Texas	W 41–37	14–4 (5–2)
Feb 15	SMU*	Gregory Gymnasium • Austin, Texas	W 38–21	15–4 (6–2)
Feb 18	Baylor*	Gregory Gymnasium • Austin, Texas	W 41–39	16–4 (7–2)
Feb 25	TCU*	Gregory Gymnasium • Austin, Texas	W 53–26	17–4 (8–2)
Feb 22	Rice*	Gregory Gymnasium • Austin, Texas	W 50–41	18–4 (9–2)
Mar 2	Texas A&M*	Gregory Gymnasium • Austin, Texas	W 66–32	19–4 (10–2)
1939 NCAA tournament
Mar 20	Oregon	California Coliseum • San Francisco, California; NCAA Tournament Quarterfinal (West Regional)	L 41–56	19–5
Mar 21	Utah State	California Coliseum • San Francisco, California; NCAA West Regional Third-Place Game	L 49–51	19–6
*Southwest Conference game.
