= Ed Olle =

College baseball and basketball player

Biographical details
- Born: February 12, 1904
- Died: April 3, 1964 (aged 60)
- Education: University of Texas

Playing career

Basketball
- 1926–27: Texas

Baseball
- 1926–27: Texas

Coaching career (HC unless noted)
- 1931–1934: Texas

Administrative career (AD unless noted)
- 1956–1962: Texas

Head coaching record
- Overall: 49–18

Accomplishments and honors

Championships
- Southwest Conference Champions (1933)

Awards
- 2 All-Southwest Conference honors (Baseball 1926, 1927)

Ed Olle (February 12, 1904 – April 3, 1964) was a college baseball and college basketball player, a men's college basketball head coach, and an athletics director at The University of Texas at Austin.

Olle played for Texas Longhorns men's basketball head coach E. J. "Doc" Stewart and for Texas baseball head coach William J. "Billy" Disch. He received all-Southwest Conference honors in baseball in 1926 and 1927. Olle would go on to coach the Longhorns in basketball for three seasons (1931–34) following the departure of "Mysterious" Fred Walker in 1931. His 1932–33 team finished the season as Southwest Conference champions with a 22–1 overall record and would many decades later receive retroactive recognition as that season's top team by the Premo-Porretta Power Poll (the team playing as it did in an era preceding the existence of national basketball tournaments or polling). After three seasons as head coach, Olle resigned and moved into a position in the UT Athletics Department, first under Texas football head coach and Athletics Director Jack Chevigny, and later under football coach and Athletics Director Dana X. Bible. He was subsequently hired as UT Athletics Director in 1956 and remained in that position until 1962.

== Head coaching record ==
Record table
| Season | Team | Overall | Conference | Standing | Postseason |
|---|---|---|---|---|---|
Texas (Southwest Conference) (1931–1934)
| 1931–32 | Texas | 13–9 | 5–7 | 4th | |
| 1932–33 | Texas | 22–1 | 11–1 | 1st | |
| 1933–34 | Texas | 14–8 | 6–6 | 3rd | |
| Texas: | | 49–18 (.731) | 22–14 (.611) | | |
| Total: | | 49–18 (.731) | 22–14 (.611) | | |
National champion Postseason invitational champion Conference regular season champion Conference regular season and conference tournament champion Division regular season champion Division regular season and conference tournament champion Conference tournament champion
