= Leon Black (basketball) =

American basketball coach (1932–2021)

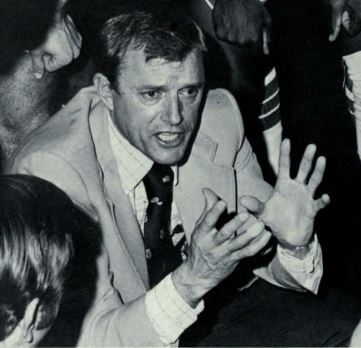
- Black during the 1974–75 season

Biographical details
- Born: February 21, 1932
- Died: October 12, 2021 (aged 89); Austin, Texas, U.S.

Playing career
- 1950–1953: Texas

Coaching career (HC unless noted)
- 1959–1964: Lon Morris College
- 1964–1967: Texas (assistant)
- 1967–1976: Texas

Head coaching record
- Overall: 106–121
- Tournaments: 1–3 (NCAA)

Accomplishments and honors

Championships
- 2 SWC regular season (1972, 1974)

Leon Black (February 21, 1932 – October 12, 2021) was an American college basketball coach.

Black, who coached the Texas Longhorns men's basketball team from 1967 to 1976, guided the Longhorns to two NCAA tournaments as a result of winning the Southwest Conference twice in his nine seasons as head coach. The Longhorns lost in the Sweet Sixteen in 1972 and the first round in 1974. Prior to his time at Texas, Black was head coach at junior college Lon Morris College in Jacksonville, Texas, compiling a 131–35 record in five seasons.

Black resigned from Texas on February 28, 1976 and was replaced by Abe Lemons seventeen days later on March 16.

Black died on October 12, 2021 in Austin, Texas, aged 89.

== Head coaching record ==
Record table
Season	Team	Overall	Conference	Standing	Postseason
Texas Longhorns (Southwest Conference) (1967–1976)
1967–68	Texas	11–13	8–6	T–2nd	
1968–69	Texas	9–15	5–9	T–6th	
1969–70	Texas	11–13	6–8	6th	
1970–71	Texas	12–12	6–8	T–5th	
1971–72	Texas	19–9	10–4	T–1st	NCAA University Division Regional Semifinals
1972–73	Texas	13–12	7–7	T–5th	
1973–74	Texas	12–15	11–3	1st	NCAA Division I First Round
1974–75	Texas	10–15	6–8	T–4th	
1975–76	Texas	9–17	4–12	8th	
Texas:		106–121 (.467)	63–65 (.492)		
Total:		106–121 (.467)			
National champion Postseason invitational champion Conference regular season champion Conference regular season and conference tournament champion Division regular season champion Division regular season and conference tournament champion Conference tournament champion
