= Marty Karow =

American baseball and football player (1904–1986)

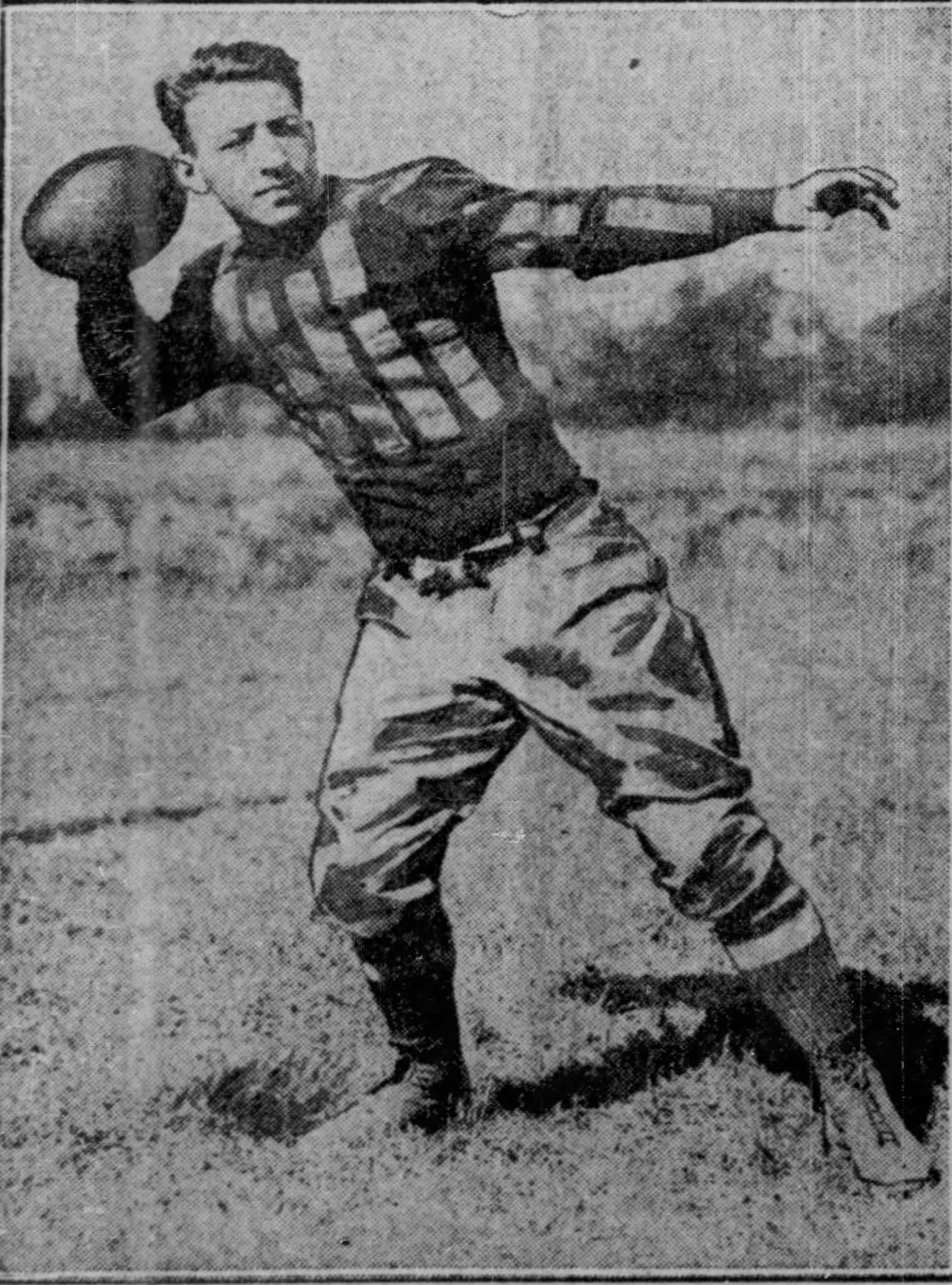
- Karow in 1925

Biographical details
- Born: July 18, 1904; Braddock, Pennsylvania, U.S.
- Died: April 27, 1986 (aged 81); Bryan, Texas, U.S.

Playing career

Football
- 1924–1926: Ohio State

Baseball
- 1925–1927: Ohio State
- 1927: Lewiston Twins
- 1927: Waterbury Brasscos
- 1927: Boston Red Sox
- 1928: Waco Cubs
- 1929: Des Moines Demons
- 1929–1930: Pueblo Steelworkers
- Positions: Fullback (football); Shortstop, third baseman (baseball)

Coaching career (HC unless noted)

Football
- 1939: Texas A&M (assistant)
- 1942: Corpus Christi NAS

Basketball
- 1934–1936: Texas
- 1941–1942: Texas A&M
- 1945–1950: Texas A&M

Baseball
- 1936: Navy
- 1938–1941: Texas A&M
- 1948–1950: Texas A&M
- 1951–1975: Ohio State

Head coaching record
- Overall: 78–113 (basketball); 580–423–17 (baseball)

Accomplishments and honors

Awards
- First-team All-American (1926); First-team All-Big Ten (1926)

Martin Gregory Karow [born Karowsky] (July 18, 1904 – April 27, 1986) was an All-American college football player and a professional baseball player.

== Biography ==
Karow was a fullback on the Ohio State University football team from 1924 through 1926. In 1926, he was team captain and led the team to a 7–1 record. After the season, he was named to several All America teams.

After college, he became a backup infielder in Major League Baseball who played in six games for the Boston Red Sox in the 1927 season. A native of Braddock, Pennsylvania, he batted and threw right-handed.

Karow hit .200, going two for 10 with one double.

Following his playing career, Karow served as the basketball head coach of the University of Texas during the 1934–35 and 1935–36 seasons and as a baseball coach at the United States Naval Academy (1936). He later coached for the Texas A&M University (1938–1941, 1948–1950) and Ohio State University baseball teams, leading the Buckeyes to the College World Series four times (1951, 1965–1967), including the 1966 College World Series title. He also served in the military during World War II.

== Death ==
Karow died of a heart attack, at age 81, on April 27, 1986, in Bryan, Texas.

== Head coaching record ==
=== Football ===
Year	Team	Overall	Conference	Standing	Bowl/playoffs
Corpus Christi Naval Air Station Comets (Independent) (1942)
1942	Corpus Christi NAS	4–3–1			
Corpus Christi NAS:		4–3–1			
Total:		4–3–1			

=== Basketball ===
Record table
Season	Team	Overall	Conference	Standing	Postseason
Texas Lonhorns (Southwest Conference) (1934–1936)
1934–35	Texas	16–7	5–7	4th	
1935–36	Texas	15–9	8–4	T–2nd	
Texas:		31–16 (.660)	13–11 (.542)		
Texas A&M Aggies (Southwest Conference) (1941–1942)
1941–42	Texas A&M	8–16	4–8	6th	
Texas A&M Aggies (Southwest Conference) (1945–1950)
1945–46	Texas A&M	9–14	4–8	6th	
1946–47	Texas A&M	8–17	4–8	5th	
1947–48	Texas A&M	7–17	2–10	6th	
1948–49	Texas A&M	5–19	2–10	6th	
1949–50	Texas A&M	10–14	6–6	T–4th	
Texas A&M:		47–97 (.326)	22–50 (.306)		
Total:		78–113 (.408)	35–61 (.365)		
