= 1932–33 Texas Longhorns men's basketball team =

American college basketball season

1932–33 Texas Longhorns men's basketball

Southwest Conference Champions
- Conference: Southwest Conference
- Record: 22–1 (11–1 SWC)
- Head coach: Ed Olle (2nd season)
- Captain: Ed Price

The 1932–33 Texas Longhorns men's basketball team represented The University of Texas at Austin in intercollegiate basketball competition during the 1932–33 season. The Longhorns were led by second-year head coach Ed Olle and captained by future Longhorn football head coach Ed Price. The team finished the season with a 22–1 record and were retroactively listed as the top team of the season by the Premo-Porretta Power Poll.

== Schedule and results ==
Coach: Ed Olle; Overall record: 22–1; Southwest Conference record: 11–1; Southwest Conference standing: 1st
| Date | Opponent | Site | Result | Record |
| Dec 8 | @ Southwest Texas State | ? • San Marcos, Texas | W 42–12 | 1–0 |
| Dec 13 | Southwest Texas State | Gregory Gymnasium • Austin, Texas | W 49–13 | 2–0 |
| Dec 16 | Texas A&I | Gregory Gymnasium • Austin, Texas | W 40–15 | 3–0 |
| Dec 17 | Texas A&I | Gregory Gymnasium • Austin, Texas | W 39–30 | 4–0 |
| Dec 21 | Randolph AFB | Gregory Gymnasium • Austin, Texas | W 33–18 | 5–0 |
| Dec 22 | @ Texas Chiropractors | ? • ???, Texas | W 40–15 | 6–0 |
| Dec 29 | Hardin-Simmons | Gregory Gymnasium • Austin, Texas | W 64–20 | 7–0 |
| Dec 30 | Hardin-Simmons | Gregory Gymnasium • Austin, Texas | W 47–25 | 8–0 |
| Dec 31 | Hardin-Simmons | Gregory Gymnasium • Austin, Texas | W 53–34 | 9–0 |
| Jan 4 | House of David | Gregory Gymnasium • Austin, Texas | W 68–28 | 10–0 |
| Jan 8 | Baylor* | Gregory Gymnasium • Austin, Texas | W 48–26 | 11–0 (1–0 SWC) |
| Jan 13 | Arkansas* | Gregory Gymnasium • Austin, Texas | W 36–28 | 12–0 (2–0) |
| Jan 14 | Arkansas* | Gregory Gymnasium • Austin, Texas | W 31–28 | 13–0 (3–0) |
| Jan 18 | SMU* | Gregory Gymnasium • Austin, Texas | W 39–33 | 14–0 (4–0) |
| Jan 21 | @ Texas A&M* | ? • College Station, Texas | W 38–31 | 15–0 (5–0) |
| Feb 2 | Austin All-Stars | Gregory Gymnasium • Austin, Texas | W 59–12 | 16–0 |
| Feb 8 | @ Baylor* | ? • Waco, Texas | W 34–28 | 17–0 (6–0) |
| Feb 11 | TCU* | Gregory Gymnasium • Austin, Texas | W 31–29 | 18–0 (7–0) |
| Feb 14 | @ Rice* | ? • Houston, Texas | W 33–24 | 19–0 (8–0) |
| Feb 18 | @ SMU* | ? • Dallas, Texas | W 28–27 | 20–0 (9–0) |
| Feb 20 | @ TCU* | ? • Fort Worth, Texas | L 26–42 | 20–1 (9–1) |
| Feb 22 | Rice* | Gregory Gymnasium • Austin, Texas | W 59–31 | 21–1 (10–1) |
| Mar 4 | Texas A&M* | Gregory Gymnasium • Austin, Texas | W 51–20 | 22–1 (11–1) |
*Southwest Conference Game.
