= Mysterious Walker =

American athlete and coach (1884–1958)

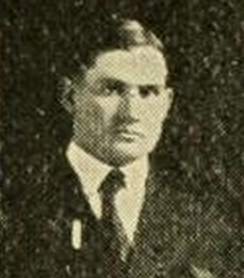
- Walker pictured, c. 1908, coaching Utah State's football team
- Pitcher
- Born: March 21, 1884; Utica, Nebraska, U.S.
- Died: February 1, 1958 (aged 73); Oak Park, Illinois, U.S.
- Batted: Right Threw: Right

MLB debut
- June 28, 1910, for the Cincinnati Reds

Last MLB appearance
- September 29, 1915, for the Brooklyn Tip-Tops

MLB statistics
- Win–loss record: 7–23
- Earned run average: 4.00
- Strikeouts: 143
- Stats at Baseball Reference

Teams
- Cincinnati Reds (1910); Cleveland Naps (1912); Brooklyn Superbas (1913); Pittsburgh Rebels (1914); Brooklyn Tip-Tops (1915)
Coaching career
Playing career
Football
1904–1906	Chicago
Positions	halfback (football) pitcher (baseball)
Coaching career (HC unless noted)
Football
1907–1908	Utah Agricultural
1908	Denver (assistant)
1909	Chicago (assistant)
1912–1913	Carnegie Tech (assistant)
1914	Washington & Jefferson (assistant)
1916	Chicago (assistant)
1917	Williams
1919	New York Agricultural
1921	DePauw
1922	Michigan Agricultural (backfield)
1923	Michigan Agricultural (freshmen)
1924–1925	Drury
1936–1939	Wheaton (IL)
Basketball
1907–1908	Utah Agricultural
1917–1918	Dartmouth
1918–1919	Rhode Island State
1921–1922	DePauw
1922–1924	Michigan Agricultural
1924–1926	Drury
1926–1927	Loyola (LA)
1927–1931	Texas
1936–1940	Wheaton (IL)
Baseball
1910	Ole Miss
1911	Oregon Agricultural
1917	Chicago (assistant)
1919	Rhode Island State
1920	New York Agricultural
1922	DePauw
1923–1924	Michigan Agricultural
1937–1940	Wheaton (IL)
Administrative career (AD unless noted)
1907–1908	Utah Agricultural
1918–1919	Rhode Island State
1919–1920	New York Agricultural
1921–1922	DePauw
1926–1927	Loyola (LA)
1937–1940	Wheaton (IL)
Head coaching record
Overall	37–32–5 (football); 142–141 (basketball)
Accomplishments and honors
Championships
National (1905)
Awards
First-team All-Western (1906)

Frederick Mitchell Walker (March 21, 1884 – February 1, 1958), nicknamed "Mysterious", was an American athlete and coach. He was a three-sport athlete for the University of Chicago from 1904 to 1906 and played Major League Baseball as a right-handed pitcher for the Cincinnati Reds, Cleveland Indians, Brooklyn Superbas, Pittsburgh Rebels and Brooklyn Tip-Tops.

He earned the nickname "Mysterious" after pitching under a pseudonym for the San Francisco Seals of the Pacific Coast League in 1910. He also served as a college basketball, baseball and football coach at numerous colleges and universities, including Utah State University, University of Mississippi, Oregon State University, Carnegie Tech, Washington & Jefferson College, Williams College, Dartmouth College, Michigan State University, DePauw University, Loyola University New Orleans, University of Texas, and Wheaton College.

== Early years ==
Walker was born in 1884 in Utica, Nebraska. He later moved during his youth to the Hyde Park section of Chicago.

== Athlete at the University of Chicago ==
Walker attended the University of Chicago where he played football, baseball and basketball. He played at the halfback position for Amos Alonzo Stagg's Chicago Maroons football teams from 1904 to 1906. As a freshman in October 1904, Walker suffered a concussion during a practice session when he collided with another player. The injury initially appeared not to be serious, but later that night Walker became "temporarily deranged" and, during his "delerium" he believed he was playing a football game against Northwestern that was scheduled for the following week. He was a member of the 1905 Chicago Maroons football team that defeated Michigan by a score of 2–0 ending a 56-game unbeaten streak for Fielding H. Yost's "Point-a-Minute" teams. Walker played a strong first half in the 1905 win over Michigan, but was forced to leave the game at the start of the second half due to a knee injury. In November 1906, the Chicago Daily Tribune wrote: "Fred Walker is playing his third year on the maroon team and is considered to be one of the best all round players in the country. Last year in the backfield, he is being used at end this season."

Walker was also one of the most dependable pitchers for the Maroons' baseball teams for three years, also coached by Amos Alonzo Stagg, and won one varsity letter in basketball. In one season, he pitched in every baseball game except two for the University of Chicago.

== Coaching career and professional baseball ==
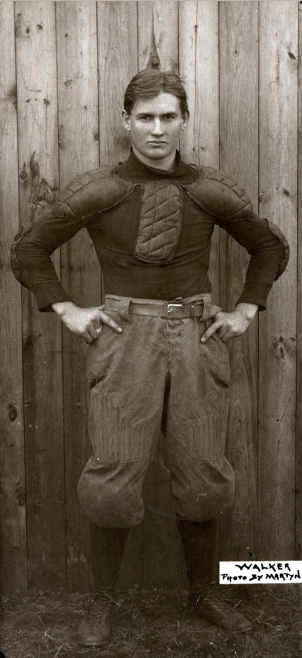
Walker, c. 1906

=== 1907–1910 ===
After graduating from Chicago in 1907, Walker was hired as the athletic director and coach of four sports at Utah Agricultural College, now known as Utah State University. His 1907 Utah Aggies football team finished the season with a 6–1 record and outscored opponents 184 to 25. The 1908 team began the season 4–0 after scoring 138 points to 6 for the opponents. However, during the 1908 football season, one of Walker's football players was killed during a game, and the sport was abolished at the college. He spent the latter part of the 1908 season as an assistant coach under John P. Koehler at the University of Denver.

In the summer of 1908, Walker played semi-professional baseball for the Rogers Parks team on the north side of Chicago. His pitching for Rogers Parks brought Walker to the attention of Chicago White Sox owner Charles Comiskey, who reportedly told Walker to "name his terms."

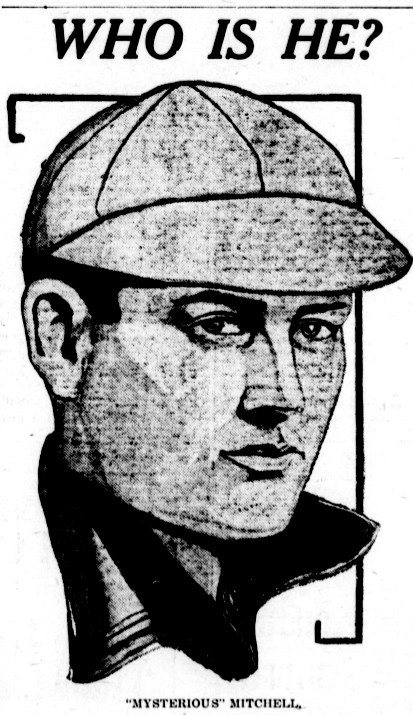
A sketch of Walker from The Spokane Press in 1910

In 1909, Walker returned to the University of Chicago as an assistant football coach under head coach Stagg. In 1910, he coached the University of Mississippi baseball team and led them to the southern college championship, finishing with a record of 11–3. At the conclusion of the college baseball season in 1910, Walker left Mississippi and joined the Cincinnati Reds as a pitcher. He appeared in one game for the Reds, pitching three innings on June 28, 1910, and allowing four hits and one earned run.

Walker finished the 1910 season playing baseball for the San Francisco Seals in the Pacific Coast League. He appeared in 11 games for the Seals and compiled a record of 6–4 with a 2.68 earned run average.

While playing for San Francisco in 1910, Walker identified himself as Frank Mitchell, leaving off his last name. Mystery surrounded his appearances in the Pacific Coast League. Some accounts indicate that he wore a mask while pitching for the Seals. After he won both games of a doubleheader over the Los Angeles Angels in early September 1910, allowing seven hits in the first game and six in the second, the Los Angeles Times first referred to him as "Mysterious Mitchell", reporting as follows:

"The big feature of this first double-header was the work of the iron 'busher' who heaved in both games. In the first, of ten innings, he allowed but seven hits, and in the second, of seven innings, six swats were made off him. ... Hash Mitchell, the mystery that came from nowhere to pitch four straight victories for the Seals ... Every one watched Mitchell in the hope that they might guess who he is by looking at him, and while they were gazing they saw some real spit ball pitching that was remarkable for the amount of juice he used to deceive the local batsmen."

The following week, the buzz surrounding "Mysterious Mitchell" continued to grow. Following a game in San Francisco, the press reported that Mitchell remained the focus of attention:

"Mysterious Mitchell furnished the sensation at Recreation Park once more this afternoon when 8000 wildly excited fans upset baseball tradition. ... Until after the game the twirler created as much interest and excitement as the contest itself as there was still more to follow. He was the center of a throng as he left the stand and when he went to the offices of the baseball company, several hundred people gathered to look at him and call for a speech."

On September 19, 1910, Chicago sporting writers identified Mysterious Mitchell based on a photograph published by the Los Angeles Times as Fred Walker, the former pitching star for the University of Chicago. The press reported that Walker had signed earlier in the summer with the New York Giants but "got into trouble with a chambermaid at a hotel where he stopped, who accused the young pitcher of attempted assault." Following the accusation, Walker had disappeared leaving no trace until his photograph appeared in the Los Angeles Times. For the rest of his career in baseball, Walker was known as either "Mysterious Walker" and "Mysterious Mitchell."

=== 1911–1916 ===
In 1911, Walker coached the baseball team for the Oregon Aggies. His Oregon Aggies team finished 8–7 and lost the championship by a half game. During the winter of 1911–1912, Walker served as the coach for a basketball team in San Francisco. He was discharged in January 1912 after striking a referee in an altercation that grew out of a disagreement in a game. Members of the team petitioned to have Walker reinstated, contending that the referee's conduct justified the blow.

In 1912, Walker signed with the Cleveland Indians and appeared in one game, pitching one inning and giving up no hits and no earned runs. In the fall of 1912, Walker served as a football coach at Carnegie Tech. After pitching in the major leagues, he returned to Carnegie Tech as football coach in the fall of 1913, and played professional basketball that winter for Pittsburgh.

In 1913, Walker returned to Major League Baseball as a pitcher for the Brooklyn Superbas. He appeared in 11 games for Brooklyn in 1913, pitching 58 1/3 innings and compiling a 3.55 earned run average. In August 1913, The Pittsburgh Press wrote of Walker: "Fred Walker, otherwise known as 'Mysterious Mitchell,' who is pitching for Brooklyn, appears to be a perfectly good topnotcher for about four innings. After that—well, he hasn't won any laurels as a stayer."

In 1914, Walker pitched for the Pittsburgh Rebels of the Federal League. He appeared in 35 games for the Rebels in 1914, pitching a career-high 169 1/3 innings with a record of 4–16 and a 4.33 earned run average. He ranked ninth in the Federal League with 16 losses in 1914 and led the league with 12 wild pitches. During the fall of 1914, Walker served as an assistant football coach under Bob Folwell at Washington & Jefferson College.

In 1915, Walker played his final season of professional baseball with the Brooklyn Tip-Tops of the Federal League. He appeared in 13 games for the Tip-Tops in 1915, pitching 65 2/3 innings with a 3.70 earned run average. He appeared in his final Major League game on September 29. In 1916, Walker played minor league baseball, playing for teams in Albany and Utica, New York. In the fall of 1916, Walker returned to the University of Chicago as an assistant football coach under head coach Stagg.

=== 1917–1925 ===
Walker served as an assistant baseball coach in the spring of 1917 back at the University of Chicago. During the summer of 1917, Walker played minor league baseball for New Haven in the Eastern League. In September 1917, the Williams College athletic council announced the hiring of Walker as the college's football coach. Walker served as the head football coach at Williams College in 1917 and led the team to the first undefeated season in the school's history with seven wins and one tie. The 1917 Williams team defeated traditional football power Cornell 14–10 in the second game of the season and finished the season with a 20–0 win over rival, Amherst College.

In December 1917, Walker was hired by Dartmouth College as the school's head basketball coach. After the basketball team lost the first 20 games of the season, the Dartmouth Athletic Council discontinued Walker's services in February 1918. At the time, The New York Times wrote: "The dissatisfaction of the student body, together with methods of coaching that were described as not in keeping with the council's idea of how a Dartmouth team should be coached, were given as the reasons for releasing Walker."

He signed with the St. Louis Cardinals in February 1918, but spent the summer playing minor league baseball for the Newark Bears and Binghamton Bingoes. He appeared in 20 minor league games in 1918, with a record of 8–9 and a 2.58 earned run average. Following the United States' entry into World War I, Walker served as the athletic director for the Second Naval District at Newport, Rhode Island.

At the end of World War I, Walker was hired as the athletic director and head basketball coach at Rhode Island State College, now known as University of Rhode Island. During the 1919 basketball season, Walker led the Rhode Island Rams to a 7–1 record; his .875 winning percentage is the highest among all basketball coaches in the school's history. Walker also coached the school to its first ever basketball victory over Brown University's varsity. Walker left Rhode Island abruptly when the school refused to increase his $3,000 salary. The school's Board of Managers refused to reconsider even after receiving a petition signed by 147 of the school's 255 students.

From 1919 to 1920, Walker served as the athletic director and football and baseball coach at the New York Agricultural College, now known as State University of New York at Farmingdale. After a year in which the football team went 2–5, Walker resigned his position in June 1920. He stated that his decision was due to the failure of the legislature to appropriate funds to carry on the athletic program at the school.

In September 1920, Walker returned to the University of Chicago as an assistant football coach under Amos Alonzo Stagg. In February 1921, Walker signed a three-year contract to serve as the athletic director and head football, basketball and baseball coach at DePauw University in Greencastle, Indiana. In his one year as the head basketball coach, Walker led the Tigers to a 17–3 mark in 1921–1922. He led DePauw's 1921 football team to a 4–3 record. Walker's baseball team finished the 1922 season at 4–8.

In August 1922, Walker was hired by Michigan Agricultural College, now Michigan State University, as advisory coach of the football team and as head coach of the basketball and baseball teams. In two seasons as the head basketball and baseball coach at M.A.C. between 1922 and 1924, Walker's basketball and baseball teams had records of 20–19 and 20–11, respectively. From 1924 to 1926, Walker served as the basketball and football coach at Drury College in Springfield, Missouri. In November 1924, Walker was hailed by the Chicago Daily Tribune as "Drury's miracle man" when he took "a team of light recruits" and developed them into one of the most sensational elevens in the history of the Missouri Conference." However, Drury's basketball team failed to post a winning record in Walker's two seasons at the helm, amassing a cumulative mark of seven wins and thirteen losses.

=== 1926–1940 ===
From 1926 to 1927, Walker served as athletic director and coach at Loyola University New Orleans. In his one year as the head basketball coach at Loyola, Walker led the team to a 12–6 record, including three wins over LSU. In September 1927, Walker was hired as the head basketball coach at the University of Texas. He remained in the position from 1927 to 1931, compiling a 51–30 combined record during his four-year stint as head coach at Texas. Walker led the Longhorns to an 18–2 overall record and 10–2 conference record during his second season. He was terminated following the Longhorns' 9–15 season in his fourth year.

In August 1932, Walker was appointed as the head football coach at J. Sterling Morton High School in Cicero, Illinois. In October 1932, he was dismissed after Major W.P. MacLean, head of the school's physical education department, charged that Walker was inefficient, had been late for classes, had allowed students to take out uniforms and equipment without making a deposit, and had allowed the shower rooms dirty during the football season. Nearly 300 citizens and parents crowded into the school's regular board room to protest the action. Walker was reinstated after the school superintendent issued a report declaring the charges against Walker to be "petty and trivial." Two weeks after Walker's reinstatement, the individual who had made the charges against him was removed from his position at the school.

From 1936 to 1940, Walker coached baseball, football and basketball at Wheaton College in Wheaton, Illinois. In May 1937, he was also named athletic director at Wheaton College. Walker was the head coach of the Crusaders football, basketball and baseball teams for four years between 1936 and 1940 and compiled a record of 11–14–4 in football, 28–34 in basketball and 31–35 in baseball. In January 1940, Walker announced that he would resign his coaching positions effective in June 1940. He noted that he was dissatisfied with the ouster of the university president, James Oliver Buswell, and he intended to devote more time to his security business.

== Later years ==
Walker retired from coaching in 1940 and worked in the investment business. He was a vice president of Chesley and Co. from 1952 to 1958. In February 1958, Walker died suddenly from a heart attack at his home in Oak Park, Illinois.

== Head coaching record ==
=== Football ===
Year	Team	Overall	Conference	Standing	Bowl/playoffs
Utah Agricultural Aggies (Independent) (1907–1908)
1907	Utah Agricultural	6–1			
1908	Utah Agricultural	4–0			
Utah Agricultural:		10–1			
Williams Ephs (Independent) (1917)
1917	Williams	7–0–1			
Williams:		7–0–1			
New York Agricultural Aggies (Independent) (1919)
1919	New York Agricultural	2–5			
New York Agricultural:		2–5			
DePauw Tigers (Independent) (1921)
1921	DePauw	4–3			
DePauw:		4–3			
Drury Panthers (Missouri College Athletic Union) (1924–1925)
1924	Drury	3–4	2–3	T–5th	
1925	Drury	2–5	1–3	8th	
Drury:		5–9	3–6		
Wheaton Crusaders (Illinois Intercollegiate Athletic Conference) (1936–1937)
1936	Wheaton	3–2–2	2–1–2	T–5th	
1937	Wheaton	3–5	3–3	T–11th	
Wheaton Crusaders (Illinois College Conference) (1938–1939)
1938	Wheaton	3–3	2–1	T–3rd	
1939	Wheaton	2–4–2	1–0–1	T–3rd	
Wheaton:		11–14–4	8–5–3		
Total:		37–32–5			

=== Basketball ===
Record table
Season	Team	Overall	Conference	Standing	Postseason
Utah Aggies (Independent) (1907–1908)
1907–08	Utah Agricultural	0–8			
Utah Agricultural:		0–8 (.000)			
Dartmouth (Independent) (1917–1918)
1917–18	Dartmouth	0–26			
Dartmouth:		0–26 (.000)			
Rhode Island State Rams (Independent) (1918–1919)
1918–19	Rhode Island State	7–1			
Rhode Island State:		7–1 (.875)			
DePauw Tigers (Independent) (1921–1922)
1921–22	DePauw	17–3			
DePauw:		17–3 (.850)			
Michigan Agricultural Aggies (Independent) (1922–1924)
1922–23	Michigan Agricultural	10–9			
1923–24	Michigan Agricultural	10–10			
Michigan Agricultural:		20–19 (.513)			
Drury Panthers (Independent) (1924–1926)
1924–25	Drury	5–8			
1925–26	Drury	2–5			
Drury:		7–13 (.350)			
Loyola Wolf Pack (Independent) (1926–1927)
1926–27	Loyola	12–6			
Loyola:		12–6 (.667)			
Texas Longhorns (Southwest Conference) (1927–1931)
1927–28	Texas	12–5	7–5	3rd	
1928–29	Texas	18–2	10–2	2nd	
1929–30	Texas	12–9	8–4	2nd	
1930–31	Texas	9–15	2–10	7th	
Texas:		51–31 (.622)	27–21 (.563)		
Wheaton Crusaders (Independent) (1936–1940)
1936–37	Wheaton	7–11			
1937–38	Wheaton	10–7			
1938–39	Wheaton	7–6			
1939–40	Wheaton	4–10			
Wheaton:		28–34 (.452)			
Total:		142–141 (.502)			

=== Baseball ===
Record table
Season	Team	Overall	Conference	Standing	Postseason
Ole Miss Rebels (Independent) (1910)
1910	Ole Miss	11–3			
Ole Miss:		11–3 (.786)			
Oregon Agricultural Beavers (Independent) (1911)
1911	Oregon Agricultural	8–7			
Oregon Agricultural:		8–7 (.533)			
New York Agricultural Aggies (Independent) (1920)
1920	New York Agricultural				
New York Agricultural:					
DePauw Tigers (Independent) (1922)
1922	DePauw	4–8			
DePauw:		4–8 (.333)			
Michigan Agricultural Aggies (Independent) (1923–1924)
1923	Michigan Agricultural	14–4			
1924	Michigan Agricultural	6–7			
Michigan Agricultural:		20–11 (.645)			
Wheaton Crusaders (Independent) (1937–1940)
1937	Wheaton	9–8			
1938	Wheaton	9–7			
1939	Wheaton	10–5			
1940	Wheaton	3–15			
Wheaton:		31–35 (.470)			
Total:					
