= W. E. Metzenthin =

German American scholar and college sports coach and administrator

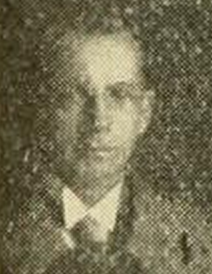
- Metzenthin pictured c. 1908 with the Texas football team

Biographical details
- Born: February 24, 1875; Berlin, Germany
- Died: September 18, 1942 (aged 67); Austin, Texas, U.S.

Playing career

Football
- 1897–1899: Franklin & Marshall
- 1903: Columbia
- Position: Quarterback

Coaching career (HC unless noted)

Football
- 1906: Texas (assistant)
- 1907–1908: Texas
- 1909: Texas (assistant)

Basketball
- 1908–1911: Texas

Track and field
- 1915–1916: Texas

Administrative career (AD unless noted)
- 1930–1935: Texas

Head coaching record
- Overall: 11–5–1 (football); 13–14 (basketball)

Waldemar Eric Metzenthin (February 24, 1875 – September 18, 1942) was a German American scholar, college sports coach, and athletics administrator. He served as professor of German studies at the University of Texas at Austin. He also coached the Texas Longhorns football team and men's basketball team from 1907 to 1908 and 1909 to 1911, respectively, and served as the athletic director at Texas from 1930 to 1935.

Metzenthin was born in Berlin on February 24, 1875. He attended Franklin & Marshall College in Lancaster, Pennsylvania, where he played college football. He earned a Master of Arts degree from Columbia University in 1906. Metzenthin came to the University of Texas in 1906 as an assistant football coach. The following year, he was appointed adjunct professor of Germanic languages, head football coach, and director of physical training. Metzenthin also taught at Southern Methodist University (SMU) from 1919 to 1922, Baylor University School of Dentistry—now known as Texas A&M University College of Dentistry—from 1922 to 1923, and North Texas State Teachers College—now known as the University of North Texas—from 1923 to 1928. He subsequently returned to the University of Texas as a full professor and was named chair of the school's department of Germanic languages in 1941. Metzenthin died after suffering a stroke on September 18, 1942, at Seton Hospital in Austin, Texas.

== Head coaching record ==
=== Football ===
Year	Team	Overall	Conference	Standing	Bowl/playoffs
Texas Longhorns (Independent) (1907–1908)
1907	Texas	6–1–1			
1908	Texas	5–4			
Texas:		11–5–1			
Total:		11–5–1			

== Basketball ==
Record table
Season	Team	Overall	Conference	Standing	Postseason
Texas (Independent) (1909–1911)
1909	Texas	6–3			
1910	Texas	6–7			
1911	Texas	1–4			
Texas:		13–14 (.481)			
Total:		13–14 (.481)			
