= Jack Gray (basketball) =

American basketball player-coach (1911–1992)

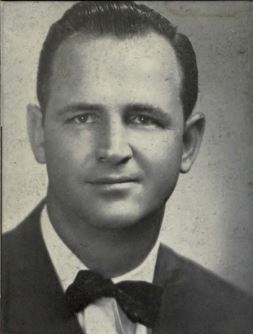
- Gray from the 1947 Cactus

Biographical details
- Born: May 12, 1911; Van Zandt County, Texas, U.S.
- Died: March 7, 1992 (aged 80); Austin, Texas, U.S.

Playing career
- 1932–1935: Texas

Coaching career (HC unless noted)
- 1936–1942: Texas
- 1945–1951: Texas

Head coaching record
- Overall: 194–97
- Tournaments: 2–3 (NCAA); 0–1 (NIT)

Accomplishments and honors

Championships
- 3 SWC regular season (1939, 1947, 1951); NCAA Final Four (1947)

Awards
- Consensus All-American (1935)

Jack Gray (May 12, 1911 – March 7, 1992) was an American college basketball player and coach at the University of Texas.

== Early life ==
Andrew Jackson Stuart Gray was born May 12, 1911, to Dr. Robert L. Gray (1876-1926) and Minnie R. Stuart (1883-1914). After his father’s death, he lived with Dr. Dewey Leonidas Sanders, the husband of his father’s late sister. Gray played basketball and football at Wills Point High School and North Texas Agricultural College in Arlington, Texas (now the University of Texas at Arlington). He was voted Most Competent Man at NTAC.

== University of Texas ==
Gray played for the Texas Longhorns men's basketball team from 1933 to 1935. As a player, he set a Southwest Conference record with 32 points in 1933 which stood for 16 years. Gray was a First-Team All-American guard in 1935 and was All-SWC all three years of his varsity career. He was known for his one-handed "push" shot, a precursor of the jump shot.

With one year of coaching experience, Gray took over the coaching job at age 25. In his first six years as coach beginning in 1937, he led the Longhorns to five winning seasons and led the Longhorns to their first Elite Eight in the first NCAA tournament in 1939. After returning from World War II, Gray led the Longhorns to their first Final Four in the 1947 NCAA tournament. He coached Basketball Hall of Famer Slater Martin from 1944 to 1949.

Gray got his team in the National Invitation Tournament in 1948, their first AP Poll ranking (#20 in 1949).

Gray ranks third all-time in Longhorns basketball history in wins with 194 victories to 97 losses and had a final Southwest Conference record of 89–55. He was head coach for 12 years, which as of 2011, ranked as the second-longest basketball coaching term at University of Texas.

Gray was Inducted into the Longhorn Hall of Honor in 1960 and the Texas Sports Hall of Fame in 1964.

== Head coaching record ==
Record table
Season	Team	Overall	Conference	Standing	Postseason
Texas Longhorns (Southwest Conference) (1936–1942)
1936–37	Texas	13–10	5–7	T–5th	
1937–38	Texas	11–11	5–7	5th	
1938–39	Texas	19–6	10–2	1st	NCAA Regional Fourth Place
1939–40	Texas	18–5	8–4	2nd	
1940–41	Texas	14–10	7–5	3rd	
1941–42	Texas	14–9	5–7	5th	
Texas Longhorns (Southwest Conference) (1945–1951)
1945–46	Texas	16–7	7–5	3rd	
1946–47	Texas	26–2	12–0	1st	NCAA Third Place
1947–48	Texas	20–5	9–3	2nd	NIT Quarterfinal
1948–49	Texas	17–7	7–5	4th	
1949–50	Texas	13–11	6–6	T–4th	
1950–51	Texas	13–14	8–4	T–1st	
Texas:		194–97 (.667)	89–55 (.618)		
Total:		194–97 (.667)			
National champion Postseason invitational champion Conference regular season champion Conference regular season and conference tournament champion Division regular season champion Division regular season and conference tournament champion Conference tournament champion

== See also ==
- List of NCAA Division I Men's Final Four appearances by coach
