= Texas Longhorns men's basketball, 1930–1939 =

American collegiate basketball team seasons

== 1929–30 season ==
=== Schedule and results ===
1929–30 Southwest Conference men's basketball standings
	Conf.				Overall
Team	W		L	PCT	W		L	PCT
Arkansas	10	–	2	.833	16	–	7	.696
Texas	8	–	4	.667	12	–	8	.600
SMU	6	–	6	.500	8	–	10	.444
Baylor	4	–	6	.400	10	–	6	.625
Texas A&M	4	–	6	.400	8	–	10	.444
Rice	4	–	8	.333	7	–	9	.438
TCU	4	–	8	.333	7	–	10	.412

Coach: Fred Walker; Overall record: 12–8; Southwest Conference record: 8–4; Southwest Conference standing: 2nd
Date	Opponent	Site	Result	Record
Dec 6	Southwest Texas State	Texas School for the Deaf Gym • Austin, Texas	W 34–22	1–0
Dec 10	Southwest Texas State	Texas School for the Deaf Gym • Austin, Texas	L 24–27	1–1
Dec 13	Daniel Baker	Texas School for the Deaf Gym • Austin, Texas	W 36–18	2–1
Dec 14	Daniel Baker	Texas School for the Deaf Gym • Austin, Texas	W 42–35	3–1
Dec 18	@ Oklahoma	? • Norman, Oklahoma	L 28–42	3–2
Dec 19	@ Oklahoma	? • Norman, Oklahoma	L 30–33	3–3
Dec 21	@ SW Oklahoma Teachers	? • Weatherford, Oklahoma	L 29–36	3–4
Dec 31	San Antonio Elks	Texas School for the Deaf Gym • Austin, Texas	W 49–26	4–4
Jan 7	@ Rice*	? • Houston, Texas	W 39–24	5–4
Jan 11	@ Baylor*	? • Waco, Texas	W 35–32 ^{2OT}	6–4
Jan 17	@ Arkansas*	? • Fayetteville, Arkansas	L 19–22	6–5
Jan 18	@ Arkansas*	? • Fayetteville, Arkansas	W 29–27	7–5
Jan 25	Baylor*	Austin High School Gym • Austin, Texas	W 42–25	8–5
Feb 7	@ SMU*	? • Dallas, Texas	L 22–25	8–6
Feb 8	@ TCU*	? • Fort Worth, Texas	W 35–21	9–6
Feb 14	Texas A&M*	Austin High School Gym • Austin, Texas	W 33–25	10–6
Feb 17	Rice*	Austin High School Gym • Austin, Texas	W 31–23	11–6
Feb 22	TCU*	Austin High School Gym • Austin, Texas	L 21–26	11–7
Feb 25	SMU*	Austin High School Gym • Austin, Texas	W 50–14	12–7
Mar 1	@ Texas A&M*	? • College Station, Texas	L 20–42	12–8
*Southwest Conference Game. ^{OT} indicates overtime.

== 1930–31 season ==
=== Schedule and results ===
Coach: Fred Walker; Overall record: 9–15; Southwest Conference record: 2–10; Southwest Conference standing: 7th
Date	Opponent	Site	Result	Record
Dec 5	North Texas State	Gregory Gymnasium • Austin, Texas	W 34–33	1–0
Dec 6	North Texas State	Gregory Gymnasium • Austin, Texas	L 26–29	1–1
n/a^{#}	St. Edward's	Gregory Gymnasium • Austin, Texas	W 25–13	2–1
Dec 12	Centenary	Gregory Gymnasium • Austin, Texas	L 29–31	2–2
Dec 13	Centenary	Gregory Gymnasium • Austin, Texas	L 22–54	2–3
Dec 19	Oklahoma	Gregory Gymnasium • Austin, Texas	L 27–28	2–4
Dec 20	Oklahoma	Gregory Gymnasium • Austin, Texas	L 33–34	2–5
Dec 23	@ San Antonio YMCA	? • San Antonio, Texas	W 69–47	3–5
Dec 23	@ San Antonio YMCA	? • San Antonio, Texas	W 56–35	4–5
Dec 27	SW Oklahoma Teachers	Gregory Gymnasium • Austin, Texas	W 43–32	5–5
Dec 30	@ Houston YMCA	? • Houston, Texas	W 50–38	6–5
Dec 31	@ Galveston All-Stars	? • Galveston, Texas	W 75–29	7–5
Jan 8	Arkansas*	Gregory Gymnasium • Austin, Texas	L 21–29	7–6 (0–1 SWC)
Jan 9	Arkansas*	Gregory Gymnasium • Austin, Texas	W 27–25	8–6 (1–1)
Jan 16	@ TCU*	? • Fort Worth, Texas	L 19–40	8–7 (1–2)
Jan 17	@ SMU*	? • Dallas, Texas	L 32–51	8–8 (1–3)
Jan 24	Baylor*	Gregory Gymnasium • Austin, Texas	L 43–45	8–9 (1–4)
Feb 7	@ Texas A&M*	? • College Station, Texas	L 10–34	8–10 (1–5)
Feb 10	SMU*	Gregory Gymnasium • Austin, Texas	L 33–41 ^{OT}	8–11 (1–6)
Feb 14	@ Rice*	? • Houston, Texas	L 42–50	8–12 (1–7)
Feb 17	TCU*	Gregory Gymnasium • Austin, Texas	L 36–41	8–13 (1–8)
Feb 21	@ Baylor*	? • Waco, Texas	L 21–34	8–14 (1–9)
Feb 26	Rice*	Gregory Gymnasium • Austin, Texas	L 16–23	8–15 (1–10)
Feb 28	Texas A&M*	Gregory Gymnasium • Austin, Texas	W 29–28	9–15 (2–10)
^{#} No date available for St. Edward's game. *Southwest Conference Game. ^{OT} indicates overtime.

== 1931–32 season ==
=== Schedule and results ===
Coach: Ed Olle; Overall record: 13–9; Southwest Conference record: 5–7; Southwest Conference standing: 4th
Date	Opponent	Site	Result	Record
Dec 9	@ Southwest Texas State	? • San Marcos, Texas	L 23–24	0–1
Dec 10	Daniel Baker	Gregory Gymnasium • Austin, Texas	W 31–17	1–1
Dec 11	Daniel Baker	Gregory Gymnasium • Austin, Texas	W 31–19	2–1
Dec 18	Southwest Texas State	Gregory Gymnasium • Austin, Texas	W 25–13	3–1
Dec 23	@ Texas Chiropractors	? • ???, Texas	W 37–31	4–1
Dec 30	Nu-Icy	Gregory Gymnasium • Austin, Texas	W 47–19	5–1
Dec 31	Dr. Pepper	Gregory Gymnasium • Austin, Texas	W 51–14	6–1
Jan 1	SW Oklahoma Teachers	Gregory Gymnasium • Austin, Texas	W 31–29	7–1
Jan 2	SW Oklahoma Teachers	Gregory Gymnasium • Austin, Texas	L 24–27	7–2
Jan 6	23rd Infantry	Gregory Gymnasium • Austin, Texas	W 41–16	8–2
Jan 8	@ Arkansas*	? • Fayetteville, Arkansas	L 21–24	8–3 (0–1 SWC)
Jan 9	@ Arkansas*	? • Fayetteville, Arkansas	W 27–25	9–3 (1–1)
Jan 15	SMU*	Gregory Gymnasium • Austin, Texas	W 35–29	10–3 (2–1)
Jan 20	TCU*	Gregory Gymnasium • Austin, Texas	L 21–26	10–4 (2–2)
Jan 23	@ Rice*	? • Houston, Texas	L 22–25	10–5 (2–3)
Feb 6	@ TCU*	? • Fort Worth, Texas	L 14–36	10–6 (2–4)
Feb 8	@ SMU*	? • Dallas, Texas	W 29–17	11–6 (3–4)
Feb 13	Texas A&M*	Gregory Gymnasium • Austin, Texas	W 32–31	12–6 (4–4)
Feb 20	@ Baylor*	? • Waco, Texas	L 28–35	12–7 (4–5)
Feb 24	Rice*	Gregory Gymnasium • Austin, Texas	W 26–19	13–7 (5–5)
Feb 27	Baylor*	Gregory Gymnasium • Austin, Texas	L 30–35	13–8 (5–6)
Mar 5	@ Texas A&M*	? • College Station, Texas	L 9–14	13–9 (5–7)
*Southwest Conference Game.

== 1932–33 season ==
=== Schedule and results ===
Coach: Ed Olle; Overall record: 22–1; Southwest Conference record: 11–1; Southwest Conference standing: 1st
Date	Opponent	Site	Result	Record
Dec 8	@ Southwest Texas State	? • San Marcos, Texas	W 42–12	1–0
Dec 13	Southwest Texas State	Gregory Gymnasium • Austin, Texas	W 49–13	2–0
Dec 16	Texas A&I	Gregory Gymnasium • Austin, Texas	W 40–15	3–0
Dec 17	Texas A&I	Gregory Gymnasium • Austin, Texas	W 39–30	4–0
Dec 21	Randolph AFB	Gregory Gymnasium • Austin, Texas	W 33–18	5–0
Dec 22	@ Texas Chiropractors	? • ???, Texas	W 40–15	6–0
Dec 29	Hardin-Simmons	Gregory Gymnasium • Austin, Texas	W 64–20	7–0
Dec 30	Hardin-Simmons	Gregory Gymnasium • Austin, Texas	W 47–25	8–0
Dec 31	Hardin-Simmons	Gregory Gymnasium • Austin, Texas	W 53–34	9–0
Jan 4	House of David	Gregory Gymnasium • Austin, Texas	W 68–28	10–0
Jan 8	Baylor*	Gregory Gymnasium • Austin, Texas	W 48–26	11–0 (1–0 SWC)
Jan 13	Arkansas*	Gregory Gymnasium • Austin, Texas	W 36–28	12–0 (2–0)
Jan 14	Arkansas*	Gregory Gymnasium • Austin, Texas	W 31–28	13–0 (3–0)
Jan 18	SMU*	Gregory Gymnasium • Austin, Texas	W 39–33	14–0 (4–0)
Jan 21	@ Texas A&M*	? • College Station, Texas	W 38–31	15–0 (5–0)
Feb 2	Austin All-Stars	Gregory Gymnasium • Austin, Texas	W 59–12	16–0
Feb 8	@ Baylor*	? • Waco, Texas	W 34–28	17–0 (6–0)
Feb 11	TCU*	Gregory Gymnasium • Austin, Texas	W 31–29	18–0 (7–0)
Feb 14	@ Rice*	? • Houston, Texas	W 33–24	19–0 (8–0)
Feb 18	@ SMU*	? • Dallas, Texas	W 28–27	20–0 (9–0)
Feb 20	@ TCU*	? • Fort Worth, Texas	L 26–42	20–1 (9–1)
Feb 22	Rice*	Gregory Gymnasium • Austin, Texas	W 59–31	21–1 (10–1)
Mar 4	Texas A&M*	Gregory Gymnasium • Austin, Texas	W 51–20	22–1 (11–1)
*Southwest Conference Game.

== 1933–34 season ==
=== Schedule and results ===
Coach: Ed Olle; Overall record: 14–8; Southwest Conference record: 6–6; Southwest Conference standing: T-3rd
Date	Opponent	Site	Result	Record
Dec 14	@ Southwest Texas State	? • San Marcos, Texas	W 40–22	1–0
Dec 16	Southwest Texas State	Gregory Gymnasium • Austin, Texas	W 66–22	2–0
Dec 21	@ Brown Paper Mills	? • ???, Texas	W 53–48	3–0
Dec 22	@ Brown Paper Mills	? • ???, Texas	W 41–28	4–0
Dec 26	@ Hunt Oilers	? • ???, Texas	L 22–28	4–1
Dec 28	Texas A&I	Gregory Gymnasium • Austin, Texas	W 57–46	5–1
Dec 29	Texas A&I	Gregory Gymnasium • Austin, Texas	W 31–27	6–1
Dec 30	Texas A&I	Gregory Gymnasium • Austin, Texas	L 32–33 ^{OT}	6–2
Jan 3	Magnolia Oilers	Gregory Gymnasium • Austin, Texas	W 49–28	7–2
Jan 6	@ TCU*	? • Fort Worth, Texas	L 31–59	7–3 (0–1 SWC)
Jan 8	@ SMU*	? • Dallas, Texas	W 27–22	8–3 (1–1)
Jan 13	Baylor*	Gregory Gymnasium • Austin, Texas	W 44–35	9–3 (2–1)
Jan 18	Texas A&M*	Gregory Gymnasium • Austin, Texas	L 29–34	9–4 (2–2)
Jan 20	Rice*	Gregory Gymnasium • Austin, Texas	W 40–38	10–4 (3–2)
Feb 5	Olsen's Swedes	Gregory Gymnasium • Austin, Texas	W 40–31	11–4
Feb 9	@ Arkansas*	? • Fayetteville, Arkansas	W 28–26	12–4 (4–2)
Feb 10	@ Arkansas*	? • Fayetteville, Arkansas	L 29–32	12–5 (4–3)
Feb 15	@ Baylor*	? • Waco, Texas	L 31–39	12–6 (4–4)
Feb 20	@ Rice*	? • Houston, Texas	L 34–45	12–7 (4–5)
Feb 23	TCU*	Gregory Gymnasium • Austin, Texas	L 25–29	12–8 (4–6)
Feb 26	SMU*	Gregory Gymnasium • Austin, Texas	W 40–32	13–8 (5–6)
Mar 3	@ Texas A&M*	? • College Station, Texas	W 27–25	14–8 (6–6)
*Southwest Conference Game. ^{OT} indicates overtime.

== 1934–35 season ==
=== Schedule and results ===
Coach: Marty Karow; Overall record: 16–7; Southwest Conference record: 5–7; Southwest Conference standing: 4th
Date	Opponent	Site	Result	Record
Dec 13	Southwest Texas State	Gregory Gymnasium • Austin, Texas	W 47–23	1–0
Dec 17	SW Oklahoma Teachers	Gregory Gymnasium • Austin, Texas	W 35–33	2–0
Dec 18	SW Oklahoma Teachers	Gregory Gymnasium • Austin, Texas	W 50–33	3–0
Dec 20	@ Southwest Texas State	? • San Marcos, Texas	W 38–26	4–0
Dec 21	@ Magnolia Oilers	? • ???, Texas	W 42–28	5–0
Dec 21	@ Finck Cigarmen	? • ???, Texas	W 38–32	6–0
Dec 27	@ Hardin-Simmons	? • Abilene, Texas	W 54–25	7–0
Dec 28	@ Hardin-Simmons	? • Abilene, Texas	W 45–27	8–0
Dec 29	@ Hardin-Simmons	? • Abilene, Texas	W 36–30	9–0
Jan 1	Texas A&I	Gregory Gymnasium • Austin, Texas	W 47–20	10–0
Jan 2	Texas A&I	Gregory Gymnasium • Austin, Texas	W 33–23	11–0
Jan 5	@ SMU*	? • Dallas, Texas	W 38–36	12–0 (1–0 SWC)
Jan 7	@ TCU*	? • Fort Worth, Texas	W 24–21	13–0 (2–0)
Jan 12	Baylor*	Gregory Gymnasium • Austin, Texas	W 44–23	14–0 (3–0)
Jan 16	@ Texas A&M*	? • College Station, Texas	L 40–41	14–1 (3–1)
Jan 19	SMU*	Gregory Gymnasium • Austin, Texas	L 28–32	14–2 (3–2)
Feb 9	@ Rice*	? • Houston, Texas	L 35–49	14–3 (3–3)
Feb 15	Arkansas*	Gregory Gymnasium • Austin, Texas	L 30–47	14–4 (3–4)
Feb 16	Arkansas*	Gregory Gymnasium • Austin, Texas	W 33–23	15–4 (4–4)
Feb 23	@ Baylor*	? • Waco, Texas	L 23–45	15–5 (4–5)
Feb 26	TCU*	Gregory Gymnasium • Austin, Texas	L 24–27	15–6 (4–6)
Mar 1	Rice*	Gregory Gymnasium • Austin, Texas	L 28–34	15–7 (4–7)
Mar 6	Texas A&M*	Gregory Gymnasium • Austin, Texas	W 35–25	16–7 (5–7)
*Southwest Conference Game.

== 1935–36 season ==
=== Schedule and results ===
Coach: Marty Karow; Overall record: 15–9; Southwest Conference record: 8–4; Southwest Conference standing: T-2nd
Date	Opponent	Site	Result	Record
Dec 13	Southwest Texas State	Gregory Gymnasium • Austin, Texas	L 33–35	0–1
Dec 18	@ Southwest Texas State	? • San Marcos, Texas	W 25–21	1–1
Dec 19	@ Sam Houston State	? • Huntsville, Texas	W 33–29	2–1
Dec 20	@ Sam Houston State	? • Huntsville, Texas	W 23–20	3–1
Dec 28	SW Oklahoma Teachers	Gregory Gymnasium • Austin, Texas	L 24–25	3–2
Dec 30	SW Oklahoma Teachers	Gregory Gymnasium • Austin, Texas	W 29–27	4–2
Dec 31	SW Oklahoma Teachers	Gregory Gymnasium • Austin, Texas	W 22–19	5–2
Jan 4	Hunt Oilers	Gregory Gymnasium • Austin, Texas	L 23–34	5–3
Jan 8	Rice*	Gregory Gymnasium • Austin, Texas	W 41–32	6–3 (1–0 SWC)
Jan 11	@ Baylor*	? • Waco, Texas	W 24–23	7–3 (2–0)
Jan 15	SMU*	UT Men's Gym • Austin, Texas	L 31–33 ^{2OT}	7–4 (2–1)
Jan 18	Baylor*	Gregory Gymnasium • Austin, Texas	W 30–24	8–4 (3–1)
Jan 21	Olsen's Swedes	Gregory Gymnasium • Austin, Texas	L 29–311	8–5
Jan 22	Olsen's Swedes	Gregory Gymnasium • Austin, Texas	W 39–35	9–5
Feb 1	Hunt Oilers	Gregory Gymnasium • Austin, Texas	W 50–46	10–5
Feb 8	TCU*	Gregory Gymnasium • Austin, Texas	W 38–25	11–5 (4–1)
Feb 12	@ Rice*	? • Houston, Texas	W 37–33	12–5 (5–1)
Feb 15	@ SMU*	? • Dallas, Texas	L 30–43	12–6 (5–2)
Feb 17	@ TCU*	? • Fort Worth, Texas	W 35–27	13–6 (6–2)
Feb 22	Texas A&M*	Gregory Gymnasium • Austin, Texas	W 43–29	14–6 (7–2)
Feb 28	@ Arkansas*	? • Fayetteville, Arkansas	L 37–38	14–7 (7–3)
Feb 29	@ Arkansas*	? • Fayetteville, Arkansas	L 31–43	14–8 (7–4)
Mar 5	@ Texas A&M*	? • College Station, Texas	W 32–27	15–8 (8–4)
Mar 10	Arkansas^	? • Houston, Texas	L 16–27	15–9
*Southwest Conference Game. ^{OT} indicates overtime. ^at Houston, Texas (Olympic tryouts)

== 1936–37 season ==
=== Schedule and results ===
Coach: Jack Gray; Overall record: 13–10; Southwest Conference record: 5–7; Southwest Conference standing: T-5th
Date	Opponent	Site	Result	Record
Dec 12	@ Southwest Texas State	? • San Marcos, Texas	L 20–24	0–1
Dec 16	Southwest Texas State	Gregory Gymnasium • Austin, Texas	W 30–12	1–1
Dec 19	Southern California	Gregory Gymnasium • Austin, Texas	L 20–28	1–2
Dec 21	@ Texas A&I	? • Kingsville, Texas	W 59–36	2–2
Dec 22	@ Texas A&I	? • Kingsville, Texas	W 37–29	3–2
Dec 23	@ Sabinas Brewers	? • ???, Texas	W 36–26	4–2
Dec 30	SW Oklahoma Teachers	Gregory Gymnasium • Austin, Texas	W 35–30	5–2
Dec 31	SW Oklahoma Teachers	Gregory Gymnasium • Austin, Texas	W 35–29	6–2
Jan 1	SW Oklahoma Teachers	Gregory Gymnasium • Austin, Texas	L 22–34	6–3
Jan 8	@ TCU*	? • Fort Worth, Texas	L 21–23	6–4 (0–1 SWC)
Jan 9	@ SMU*	? • Dallas, Texas	L 16–27	6–5 (0–2)
Jan 13	@ Texas A&M*	? • College Station, Texas	W 23–14	7–5 (1–2)
Jan 16	Rice*	Gregory Gymnasium • Austin, Texas	L 20–28	7–6 (1–3)
Jan 18	TCU*	Gregory Gymnasium • Austin, Texas	W 35–22	8–6 (2–3)
Jan 30	Olsen's Swedes	Gregory Gymnasium • Austin, Texas	W 35–29	9–6
Feb 1	Austin All-Stars	Gregory Gymnasium • Austin, Texas	W 51–10	10–6
Feb 5	Arkansas*	Gregory Gymnasium • Austin, Texas	W 39–28	11–6 (3–3)
Feb 6	Arkansas*	Gregory Gymnasium • Austin, Texas	W 43–31	12–6 (4–3)
Feb 13	@ Baylor*	? • Waco, Texas	L 31–33	12–7 (4–4)
Feb 17	@ Rice*	? • Houston, Texas	L 35–40	12–8 (4–5)
Feb 20	SMU*	Gregory Gymnasium • Austin, Texas	L 19–24	12–9 (4–6)
Feb 27	Baylor*	Gregory Gymnasium • Austin, Texas	L 39–40	12–10 (4–7)
Mar 4	Texas A&M*	Gregory Gymnasium • Austin, Texas	W 37–29	13–10 (5–7)
*Southwest Conference Game.

== 1937–38 season ==
=== Schedule and results ===
1937–38 Southwest Conference men's basketball standings
	Conf.				Overall
Team	W		L	PCT	W		L	PCT
Arkansas	11	–	1	.917	19	–	3	.864
Baylor	9	–	3	.750	10	–	6	.625
SMU	8	–	4	.667	9	–	6	.600
Texas A&M	6	–	6	.500	10	–	8	.556
Texas	5	–	7	.417	11	–	11	.500
Rice	2	–	10	.167	6	–	17	.261
TCU	1	–	11	.083	8	–	15	.348

11-11 (5-7) SWC Coach Jack Gray Schedule ?
